= List of archaeological sites by country =

This is a list of notable archaeological sites sorted by country and territories.

== Afghanistan ==
- Aï Khānum
- Bagram
- Buddhas of Bamiyan
- Hadda
- Haji Piyada mosque in Balkh
- Mes Aynak
- Minarets in Ghazni
- Mousallah Complex
- Surkh Kotal
- Takht-i-rustam
- Tillya Tepe

== Algeria ==
- Aïn Turk, Bouïra
- Altava
- Beni Hammad Fort
- Bir el Ater
- Cirta
- Diana Veteranorum
- Djémila
- Fossatum Africae
- Gemellae
- Ghoufi
- Oricum
- Hammam Essalihine
- Hippo Regius
- Jedars
- Lambaesis
- Mila, Algeria
- Miliana
- Partenia
- Qalʿat ibn Salama
- Roknia
- Royal Mausoleum of Mauretania
- Tassili n'Ajjer
- Tébessa
- Timgad
- Tipaza
- Uzinaza

== Argentina ==
- Cueva de las Manos
- Piedra Museo
- Pucará de Tilcara
- Reserva Provincial Castillos de Pincheira
- Ruins of Quilmes
- Talampaya National Park
- Tastil
- Tolombón
- Aquihuecó

== Armenia ==
- Agarak
- Amberd
- Aramus
- Areni-1
- Argištiḫinili
- Artaxata
- Armavir
- Aruchavank
- Baghaberd
- Berdavan Fortress
- Bjni Fortress
- Carahunge
- Dashtadem Fortress
- Dvin
- Erebuni Fortress
- Ertij Fort
- Garni
- Godedzor
- Halidzor Fortress
- Horom Citadel
- Kakavaberd
- Karchaghbyur
- Khrber
- Lori Fortress
- Meghri Fortress
- Metsamor site
- Nor Geghi
- Odzaberd
- Proshaberd
- Shengavit (site)
- Smbataberd
- Teishebaini
- Tegher Monastery
- Ushiberd
- Vorotnaberd
- Yererouk
- Yervandashat
- Yot Verk Matur
- Zvartnots Cathedral

== Australia ==
- Cuddie Springs
- Murujuga or Burrup Peninsula
- Ngarrabullgan
- Keilor archaeological site
- Sunbury earth rings
- Kow Swamp Archaeological Site
- Wurdi Youang
- Mount William stone axe quarry
- Balls Head Reserve
- Cloggs Cave
- Gabarnmung
- Kutikina Cave
- Madjedbebe
- Mudgegonga rock shelter
- Warratyi
- Tarragal Caves

== Austria ==
- Burgstallkogel (Sulm valley)
- Sandberg Celtic city
- Großmugl
- Carnuntum
- Vindobona
- Iuvavum
- Flavia Solva
- Virunum
- Gravesites of Pannonian Avars at Sigleß

== Azerbaijan ==
- Gobustan Rock Art Cultural Landscape
- Govurqala, Ağdam
- Govurqala, Shaki
- Govurqala, Oguz
- Govurqala, Nakhchivan
- Qabala treasures
- Archaeological site of Tava Tepe
- Çovdar, Dashkasan
- Goytepe archaeological complex
- Archaeological site of Selbir
- Leyla-Tepe culture
- Shomu-tepe

== Bahrain ==
- Ain Umm Sujoor
- Barbar Temple
- Dilmun Burial Mounds
- Diraz Temple
- Khamis Mosque
- Qal'at al-Bahrain
- Riffa Fort

== Belgium ==
- Neolithic flint mines of Spiennes
- Veldwezelt-Hezerwater

== Belize ==
- Altun Ha
- Baking Pot
- Cahal Pech
- Caracol
- Cerros
- Colha, Belize
- Cuello early agricultural site.
- Lamanai
- Lubaantun
- Nim Li Punit
- Uxbenka
- Xunantunich

== Bolivia ==
- Chiripa
- El Fuerte de Samaipata
- Isla del Sol
- Incallajta
- Iskanwaya
- Puma Punku
- Lukurmata
- Sacambaya River
- Alcaya
- Jachaphasa
- Río Lauca Chullpas
- Tiahuanaco also known as Tiwanaku

== Bosnia and Herzegovina ==
- Bijela Tabija
- Butmir
- Daorson
- Delminium
- Desilo
- Mile (Visoko)
- Neolithic site Okolište

== Brazil ==
- Amazon Stonehenge
- Kuhikugu
- Lagoa Santa
- Cavernas do Peruaçu National Park
- Pedra Furada sites
- Lapa Vermelha
- Serra da Capivara National Park
- Ruins of São Miguel das Missões
- Lapa do Santo
- Catimbau National Park
- Acre geoglyphs

== Bulgaria ==
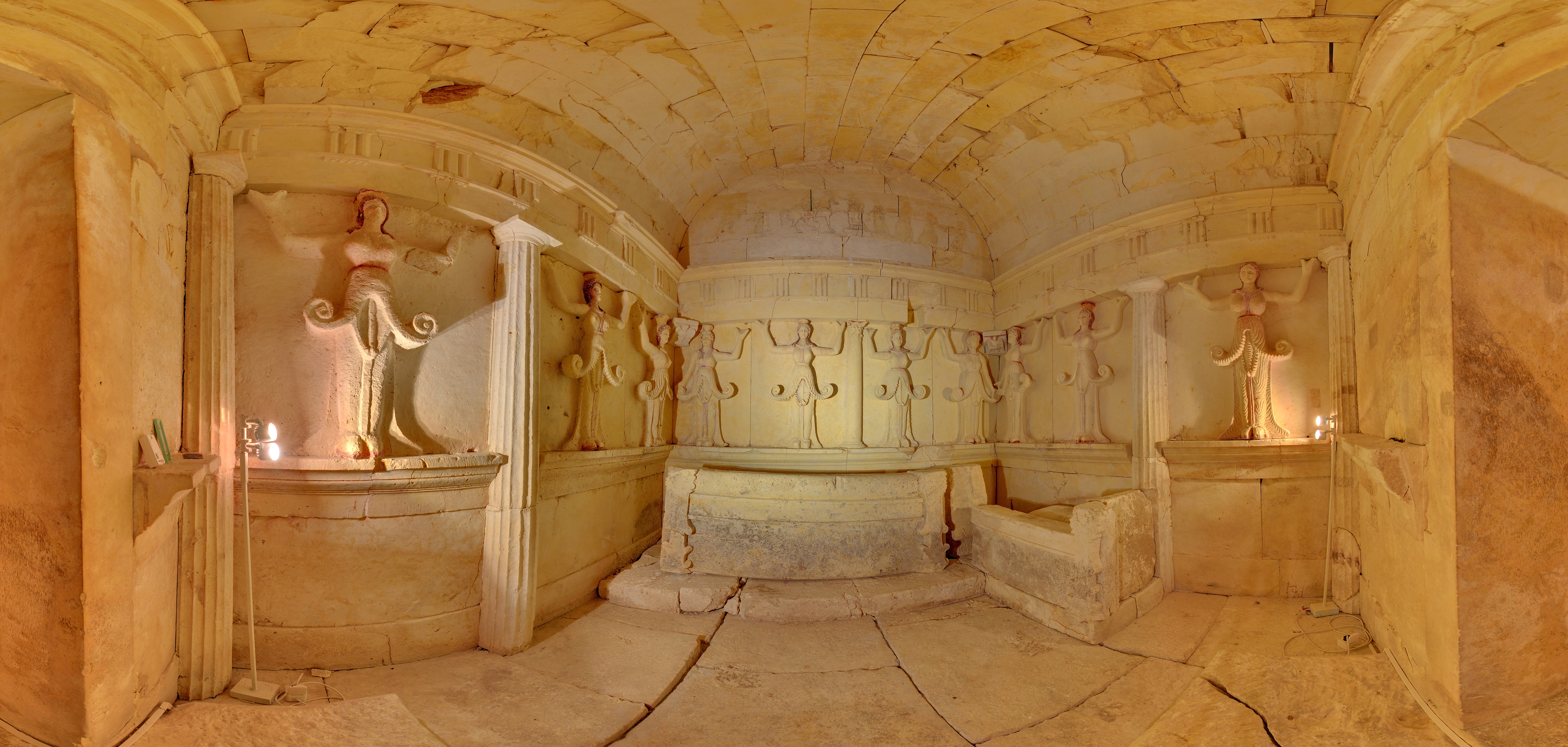
The Thracian Tomb of Sveshtari (around 300 BC)

- Abritus
- Aleksandrovo ancient tomb
- Aquae Calidae
- Armira (Roman villa)
- Augusta Trayana (Roman ruins of modern Stara Zagora)
- Bacho Kiro cave
- Castra Martis
- Dionysopolis
- Develtos
- Diocletianopolis (modern Hisarya)
- Durankulak lake and island (tell)
- Ezero (tell)
- Heraclea Sintica
- Ivanovo Rock-hewn Churches
- Kabyle
- Kaliakra
- Karanovo (tell)
- Kozarnika cave
- Kazanlak Thracian tomb and other notable sites in the region named Valley of the Thracian Rulers:
  - Golyama Arsenalka tomb
  - Griffins tomb
  - Helvetia tomb
  - Ostrusha tomb
  - Seutes III tomb
  - Shushmanets tomb
- Madara Rider (Madara archaeological reserve)
- Magura Cave
- Maltepe
  - Maltepe Mound
- Marcianopolis
- Mezek
- Nesebar
- Nicopolis ad Istrum
- Nicopolis ad Nestum
- Novae
- Odessus (modern Varna)
- Oescus
- Perperikon
- Philippopolis (modern Plovdiv):
  - Forum
  - Library
  - Odeon
  - Stadium
  - Theater
  - Domus Eirene
  - Gates and walls
  - Great Cathedral Basilica
  - Small Basilica
  - Aqueduct
- Pistiros
- Pliska
- Pomorie Thracian tomb
- Preslav
- Serdika (modern Sofia)
  - Church of Saint George, Sofia
  - Serdika amphitheatre
  - Saint Sophia Church, Sofia
  - Serika walls and gates
- Seuthopolis
- Silistra Roman Tomb
- Solnitsata (tell)
- Sozopol
- Starosel
- Storgosia (modern Pleven)
- Thracian Tomb of Sveshtari
- Tatul
- Varna Necropolis
- Yunatsite (tell)

== Burkina Faso ==
- Ancient Ferrous Metallurgy Sites of Burkina Faso
- Ruins of Loropéni

== Cambodia ==
- Siemreap:
- Angkor City covers a large portion of Siemreap
  - Ak Yum
    - Angkor Thom
      - Baphuon
      - Bayon
      - Khleangs North
      - Khleangs South
      - Phimeanakas
      - Prasat Suor Prat – 12 towers
      - Preah Palilay
      - Preah Pithu
      - Terrace of the Elephants
      - Terrace of the Leper King
    - Angkor Wat
    - Baksei Chamkrong
    - Banteay Kdei
    - Banteay Samre
    - Banteay Srei
    - Bat Chum
    - Beng Mealea
    - Chau Say Tevoda
    - East Baray
    - East Mebon
    - Kbal Spean – riverbed/underwater carvings
    - Neak Pean
    - Phnom Bakheng
    - Phnom Bok
    - Phnom Kulen
    - Phnom Krom
    - Pre Rup
    - Preah Khan
    - Roluos
      - Bakong
      - Lolei
      - Preah Ko
    - Spean Thma
    - Ta Nei
    - Ta Prohm
    - Ta Som
    - Thommanon
    - West Baray
    - West Mebon
- Kampong Cham:
  - Banteay Prei Nokor
- Kampong Thom:
  - Prasat Phum Prasat
  - Sambor Prei Kuk
- Kandal:
  - Oudong a.k.a. Phnom Preah Reach Top
- Preah Vihear:
  - Wat Phnom
  - Wat Ounalom
  - Koh Ker
    - Preah Ponlea a.k.a. Palais or Prasat Srot
  - Preah Khan Kompong Svay a.k.a. Preah Bakan
  - Preah Vihear
- Battambang:
  - Wat Ek Phnom
- Takeo:
  - Angkor Borei
  - Phnom Chiso

== Canada ==
- Bluefish Caves
- Brooman Point Village, Nunavut
- Debert, Nova Scotia
- Harrison Hill (Qithyll)
- Head-Smashed-In Buffalo Jump
- Keatley Creek Archaeological Site
- Kitigaaryuit
- Kitwanga Fort
- L'Anse aux Meadows
- Mantle Site
- Marpole Midden
- Native Point
- Ovayok Territorial Park
- Petroglyph Provincial Park, Nanaimo, BC
- Petroglyphs Provincial Park, Ontario
- Pointe-à-Callière, Montréal, QC
- Secwepemc Museum and Heritage Park (Kamloops BC)
- SG̱ang Gwaay (Ninstints)
- Sheguiandah
- Skedans (Koona, K'uuna Llnagaay)
- Southwold Earthworks
- St. Mary Reservoir, Alberta
- Strathcona Science Provincial Park
- təmtəmíxʷtən/Belcarra Regional Park
- Turtle Mountain Provincial Park
- Wanuskewin Heritage Park
- Whiteshell Provincial Park
- X̱á:ytem (Hatzic Rock)

== China ==
- An Yang
- Banpo, a Neolithic site
- Bashidang
- Chang'an, an ancient capital
- Chengtoushan
- Daming Palace National Heritage Park
- Gallery road
- Huoluochaideng, city-site with mints and coin-hoards
- Jiahu
- Lajia
- Peking Man, site at Zhoukoudian near Beijing
- Sanxingdui
- Terracotta Army, near Xian
- Tianlongshan Grottoes
- Museum of the Mausoleum of the Nanyue King, Guangzhou
- Yinxu

== Costa Rica ==
- Guayabo

== Croatia ==
- Aquae Iasae
- Burnum
- Monkodonja
- Narona
- Nesactium
- Pula Arena
- Starčevo culture
- Stari Grad Plain

== Cuba ==
- El Chorro de Maita

== Cyprus ==
- Antiphonitis
- Enkomi
- Hala Sultan Tekke
- Idalium
- Khirokitia
- Klimonas
- Kykkos Monastery
- Nea Paphos
- Notre Dame de Tyre
- Panagia Apsinthiotissa
- Paphos (ancient city-state)
- Pyla-Kokkinokremnos
- Salamis
- Sanctuary of Aphrodite Paphia
- Tombs of the Kings (Paphos)

== Czech Republic ==
- Bylany
- Dolní Věstonice
- Koněprusy
- Mikulčice-Valy
- Mladeč – Homo 31,000 years ago
- Předmostí u Přerova
- Šipka

== Denmark ==
- Aggersborg
- Fyrkat
- Klekkende Høj
- Lindholm Høje
- Randlev and Hesselbjerg
- Skuldelev ships

== Ecuador ==
- Agua Blanca
- Ingapirca
- Tumebamba
- Valdivia
- Cochasquí

== Egypt ==
- Amarna
- Colossi of Memnon
- Deir el-Medina
- Deir el-Bahri
- Edfu
- Esna
- Giza
- Heliopolis
- Karnak Temple
- Kom Ombo Temple
- Luxor Temple
- Oxyrhynchus
- Philae
- Ramesseum
- Tanis
- Valley of the Kings
- Ismailia Canal

== El Salvador ==
- Cara Sucia
- Joya de Cerén
- Quelepa
- San Andrés
- Tazumal

== Eritrea ==
- Gash Group
- Buya
- Metera
- Qohayto
- Keskese
- Adulis
- Mendefera
- Sembel

== Estonia ==
- Pulli settlement
- Rebala

== Ethiopia ==
- Hadar, Ethiopia
- Gendebelo
- Omo remains
- Mifsas Bahri
- Bouri Formation

== Finland ==
- Astuvansalmi
- Ukonkivi
- Wolf Cave

== France ==
- Grotte du Vallonnet
- Terra Amata
- Chauvet Cave
- Lascaux
- Glanum
- Glozel
- Carnac Stones

== Georgia ==
- Armazi
- Dmanisi
- Nokalakevi
- Vani

== Germany ==
- Aythra
- Bedburg-Königshoven
- Bilzingsleben
- Hirschlanden
- Königsaue
- Pfahlbau Museum Unteruhldingen
- Federsee

== Greece ==
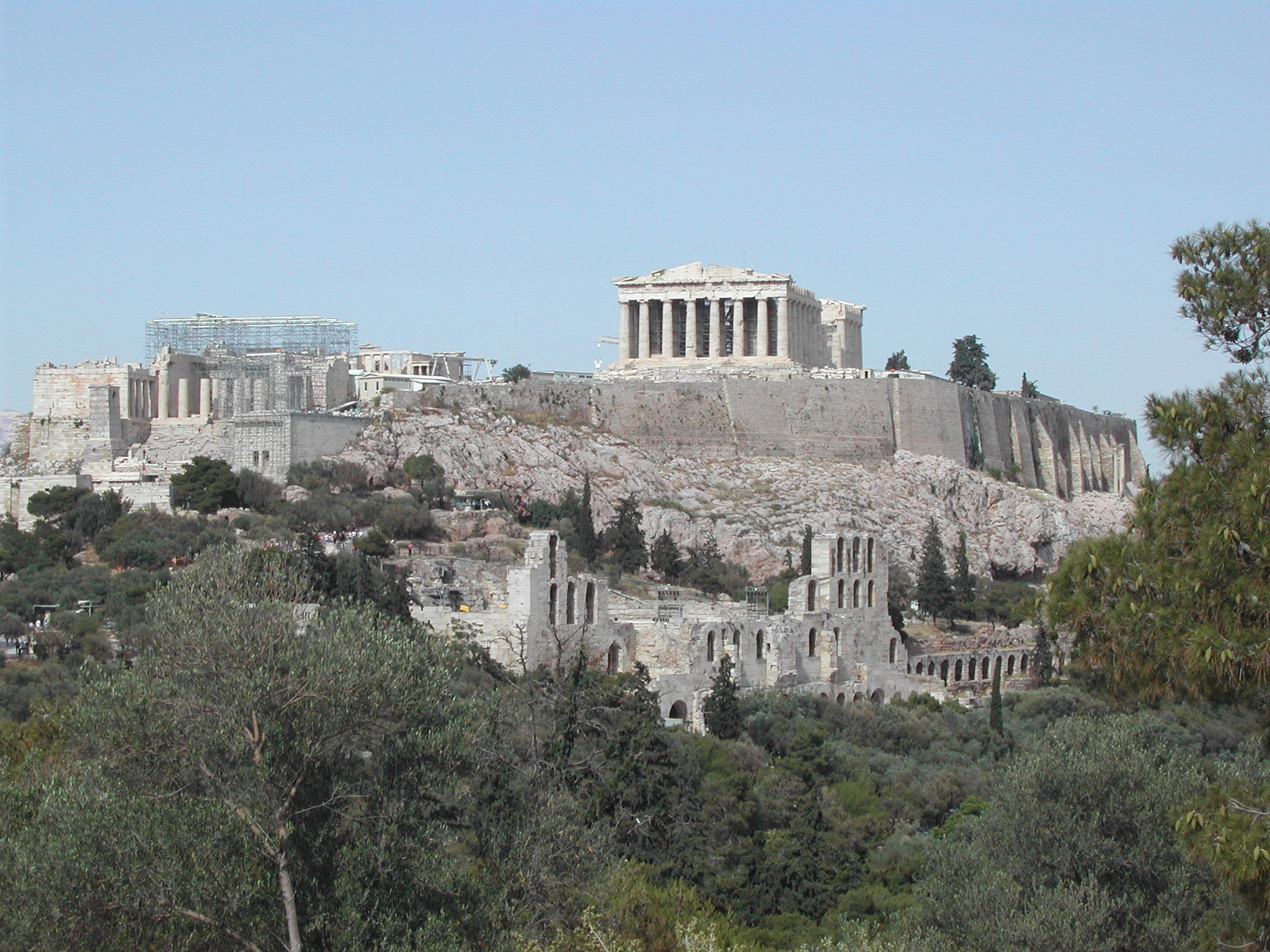
Acropolis, Athens

- Acharnae, Athens ( Mycenaean tomb)
- Aegina (Temple of Aphaea, Temple of Zeus), Attica
- Aigeira, West Greece
- Aigosthena, Attica
- Akraiphnion, Central Greece
- Akrotiri at Santorini, South Aegean
- Alifeira, West Greece
- Amphiareion of Oropos, Attica
- Amphipolis, Central Macedonia
- Amykles (ancient Amyclae), Peloponnese
- Anafi, South Aegean
- Anastasioupolis-Peritheorion, Thrace
- Anemospilia, Crete
- Anthidona, Central Greece
- Antissa, Lesbos, North Aegean
- Aptera, Crete
- Archanes – Vathypetro, Crete
- Argos, Peloponnese
- Arisbe, Lesbos, North Aegean
- Armeni, Minoan Tombs, Crete
- Arta – Ambracia, Epirus
- Asclepieion of Kos, South Aegean
- Asea, Peloponnese
- Asini, Peloponnese
- Assiros, Central Macedonia
- Central Athens (Odeon of Herodes Atticus, Acropolis, Kerameikos, Pnyx, Colonus, Areopagus, Kallimarmaro Stadium, Temple of Olympian Zeus, Temple of Hephaestus, Ancient Agora of Athens, Roman Forum, Theatre of Dionysus)
- Abdera, Thrace, East Macedonia and Thrace
- Avlida, Central Greece
- Bassae, Peloponnese
- Brauron, Attica
- Calydon, West Greece
- Cathrea at Kea, South Aegean
- Cassiope, Corfu, Ionian Islands
- Cassiope, Epirus
- Chaeronea, Central Greece
- Chalcis, Central Greece
- Chios (Temple of Apollo at Phana), North Aegean
- Kleonae, Peloponnese
- Corfu, Ionian Islands
- Corinth, Peloponnese
- Cynosura at Salamis, Attica
- Delium, Central Greece
- Delphi, Central Greece
- Delos, South Aegean
- Dimini, Thessaly
- Dion, Central Macedonia
- Dispilio, West Macedonia
- Dodona, Epirus
- Dorio, Peloponnese
- Drapetsona, Athens, Attica
- Dreros, Crete
- Dystos, Central Greece
- Eadion at Salamis, Attica
- Eani, West Macedonia
- Edessa, Central Macedonia
- Eleusis, West Attica
- Elis, West Greece
- Elyros, Crete
- Epitalion, West Greece
- Eresos, Lesbos, North Aegean
- Eretria, Central Greece
- Eretria, Thessaly
- Ephyra, Epirus
- Epidaurus (A'Theatre, B'Theatre and Asclepieion Sites), Peloponnese
- Eupalinian aqueduct of Samos, North Aegean
- Estavromenou Square, Aigaleo, Athens
- Evropos, Central Macedonia
- Figaleia, West Greece
- Fthiotides Thivae, Thessaly
- Gioura, Alonissos, Thessaly
- Gomfoi, Thessaly
- Goniae, Crete
- Gortyn, Crete
- Gournia, Crete
- Gynaecokastron, Central Macedonia
- Gythium, Peloponnese
- Hellenikon, Greek Pyramid in Hellenikon, Athens
- Hephaestia, Lemnos, North Aegean
- Hagia Triada, Crete
- Heraion of Argos, Peloponnese
- Heraion of Samos, Samos, North Aegean
- Ialysos at Rhodes, South Aegean
- Ierapetra and Vasiliki, Crete
- Isthmia, Peloponnese
- Ios, South Aegean
- Itanos and Palekastro, Crete
- Ithaca, Ionian Islands
- Ithomi, Peloponnese
- Kalymnos, South Aegean
- Kameiros at Rhodes, South Aegean
- Kallithea (Temple of Ammon Zeus), Central Macedonia
- Karfi (Karphi), Crete
- Kastron, Central Greece
- Kato Choa, Kythira, Attica
- Kaveirion, Lemnos, North Aegean
- Kavousi Kastro, Crete
- Kavousi Vronda, Crete
- Kechries, Peloponnese
- Kifissia (Roman Tomb monument near Platanou Square), Athens.
- Kionia at Tinos, South Aegean
- Kleitor, West Greece
- Knossos, Crete
- Kolchis, Central Macedonia
- Kos, South Aegean
- Kydonia, Crete
- Kyparissia, Peloponnese
- Lakereia, Thessaly
- Larissa, Thessaly
- Lato, Crete
- Lavrio, Attica
- Lefkadia, Central Macedonia
- Lefkandi, Central Greece
- Lefkopetra, Central Macedonia
- Lentas, Crete
- Lepreum, West Greece
- Lerna, Peloponnese
- Lindos, Rhodes Island, South Aegean
- Linos, East Macedonia and Thrace
- Lissos, Crete
- Loukous, Herodes Atticus Villa, Peloponnese
- Lyctus, Crete
- Lycosura, Peloponnese
- Macedonian Tombs at N.Nicomedia, Central Macedonia
- Magasa, Crete
- Malia, Crete
- Mantineia, Peloponnese
- Marathon (or Marathonas), Attica
- Maroneia, East Macedonia and Thrace
- Matala and Kommos, Crete
- Megalopolis, Peloponnese
- Megara, Attica
- Menelaeon, Peloponnese
- Mesemvria, East Macedonia and Thrace
- Midea and Dendra, Peloponnese
- Milos, South Aegean
- Minia, Kefalonia, Ionian Islands
- Minoa at Amorgos, South Aegean
- Mochlos, Crete
- Monemvasia, Peloponnese
- Mount Athos
- Mount Juktas, Crete
- Mount Lykaion, Peloponnese
- Mycenae, Peloponnese
- Myrina, Lesbos, North Aegean
- Myrtos Pyrgos, Crete
- Mystras, Peloponnese
- Mytilene, Lesbos, North Aegean
- Naousa, Central Macedonia
- Nape (Temple of Apollo), Lesbos, North Aegean
- Naupactus and Makyneia, West Greece
- Naxos (Ancient Naxos and Kouros Sites), South Aegean
- Necromanteion of Acheron, Epirus
- Nemea, Peloponnese
- Nicopolis, Epirus
- Nymphasia, Peloponnese
- Oiniades, West Greece
- Olous, Crete
- Olympia, West Greece
- Olynthus, Central Macedonia
- Orchomenus, Central Greece
- Orchomenus, Peloponnese
- Pagasae, Thessaly
- Palace of Nestor, Peloponnese
- Palaiopoli at Andros, South Aegean
- Paleopochora, Kythira, Attica
- Paleopolis at Kythira, Attica
- Panormos at Mykonos, South Aegean
- Paros (Ancient Paros and Delion Sites), South Aegean
- Partira, Crete
- Patras, West Greece
- Pella, Central Macedonia
- Perachora (Heraion), Peloponnese
- Perrevia, Leivadi, Thessaly
- Petrae, West Macedonia
- Phalasarna, Crete
- Phanarion, East Macedonia and Thrace
- Phanariion at Icaria, North Aegean
- Phaistos, Crete
- Pharsala, Thessaly
- Pheneos, Peloponnese
- Philippi, East Macedonia and Thrace
- Phourni, Crete
- Piraeus, Athens
- Plevrona, West Greece
- Poseidi, (Temple of Poseidon), Central Macedonia
- Poliochne, Lemnos, North Aegean
- Poikilassos, Crete
- Polyrrinia, Crete
- Lefkada (city), Lefkada, Ionian Islands
- Limnea – Amphilochia, West Greece
- Plataies, Central Greece
- Poseidonia and Chalandriani at Syros, South Aegean
- Potidaea, Central Macedonia
- Praessus, Crete
- Pydna, Central Macedonia
- Pylos, Peloponnese
- Pyrassos – Nea Anchialos, Thessaly
- Pyrgos, Central Greece
- Pythagoreion of Samos, Samos, North Aegean
- Roman Aqueduct of Louros, Epirus
- Rhamnus, Attica
- Rhodes (Ancient and Walled City of Rhodes), South Aegean
- Samikon, West Greece
- Samothrace Temple complex (Sanctuary of the Great Gods), East Macedonia and Thrace
- Serres, Central Macedonia
- Servia, West Macedonia
- Sesklo, Thessaly
- Sicyon, Peloponnese
- Sikinos, South Aegean
- Sitagroi, East Macedonia and Thrace
- Skillounta and Iardanos Tombs, West Greece
- Sounion, Attica
- Sparta, Peloponnese
- Spilia, West Greece
- Stratos, West Greece
- Stymphalia, Peloponnese
- Syia, Crete
- Tanagra, Central Greece
- Tarra, Crete
- Tegea, Peloponnese
- Thasos, East Macedonia and Thrace
- Thebes, Central Greece
- Thermon, West Greece
- Thermopylae, Central Greece
- Thermos, West Greece
- Thespiae, Central Greece
- Thessaloniki, Central Macedonia
- Thira, South Aegean
- Thisbe, Central Greece
- Tiryns, Peloponnese
- Thermae of Traianopolis, East Macedonia and Thrace
- Toroni, Central Macedonia
- Trikke, Thessaly
- Troezen, Attica
- Trophoniou Oracle at Livadeia, Central Greece
- Tylissos, Crete
- Vapheion, Peloponnese
- Vanaena, Peloponnese
- Vergina (Macedonian Tombs complex), Central Macedonia
- Vistonis, East Macedonia and Thrace
- Vravrona, Attica Region
- Vrisa, Lesbos, North Aegean
- Yrtakina, Crete
- Zakros, Crete

== Guatemala ==
- Aguateca
- La Amelia
- Balberta
- El Baúl
- Bejucal (Mesoamerican site)
- Bilbao (Mesoamerican site)
- La Blanca, Peten
- Cancuén
- El Chal
- Chitinamit
- Chocolá
- Chojolom
- Cival
- Dos Pilas
- Holmul
- Holtun
- Itzan
- Iximché
- Ixkun
- Ixlu
- Ixtonton
- Ixtutz
- La Joyanca
- Kaminaljuyu
- Kinal
- Machaquila
- El Mirador
- Mixco Viejo
- Montana (Mesoamerican site)
- Monte Alto culture
- Motul de San José
- La Muerta
- Naachtun
- Nakbe
- Nakum
- Naranjo
- Nebaj
- Pajaral
- El Perú (Maya site)
- El Pilar
- El Porvenir (Maya site)
- Punta de Chimino
- Quiriguá
- Q'umarkaj
- Río Azul
- Sacul, El Petén
- San Bartolo (Maya site)
- San Mateo Ixtatán
- Seibal
- La Sufricaya
- Takalik Abaj
- Tamarindito
- Tayasal (archaeological site)
- El Temblor
- Tikal
- El Tintal
- Topoxté
- Tres Islas
- Uaxactún
- Ucanal
- Ujuxte
- Witzna
- Xultún
- Yaxha
- Zacpeten
- Zaculeu
- Zapote Bobal
- El Zotz

== Honduras ==
- Copán
- El Puente

== Hong Kong ==
- Lei Cheng Uk Han Tomb
- Stone Circles
- Wong Tei Tung, Late Palaeolithic

== Hungary ==
- Aquincum
- Gorsium
- Üllő5

== India ==
- Ajanta Caves
- Adichanallur
- Adi Badri, Haryana
- Attirampakkam
- Alamgirpur
- Assandh
- Ambadevi rock shelters
- Acheulean, site of Chirki-on-Pravara
- Adichanallur
- Aihole
- Arikamedu
- Babar Kot
- Badami
- Balu, Kaithal
- Bhagatrav
- Banawali
- Bargaon (archaeological site)
- Bet Dwarka
- Baror
- Bairat Temple
- Barabar Caves, oldest Rock-cut cave of India
- Bhimbetka
- Birhana
- Bodh Gaya
- Bodh Stupa
- Burzahom archaeological site
- Chaneti Buddhist Stupa
- Chirand
- Deopahar
- Daimabad
- Desalpar Gunthli
- Doiyang Dhansiri Valley
- Dholavira, ancient metropolitan city
- Edakkal Caves, possible influence of Indus Valley Civilization in Kerala
- Elephanta Caves
- Ellora Caves
- Farmana
- Great Living Chola Temples
- Gola Dhoro
- Hampi
- Hulas
- Hastinapur
- Harsh Ka Tila
- Iron Pillar of Delhi, pillar without any corrosion standing from 400 AD
- Jaugada, Mauryan fort site
- Jognakhera
- Jorwe
- Jwalapuram
- Kalibangan
- Kanchipuram
- Kagarol
- Kaj, India
- Kanjetar
- Karanpura
- Keezhadi excavation site
- Khirasara
- Kuntasi
- Kerala-no-dhoro
- Kunal
- Kharligarh, ancient ruined fort
- Konark Sun Temple
- Kumashpur
- Khujaraho
- Konark Sun Temple
- Krimchi temples, Pandava Temples
- Kulpahar, site of 10th century remains
- Lothal
- Nalanda, largest university of ancient time and one of the oldest
- Mahaballipuram
- Manda, Jammu
- Mandi, Uttar Pradesh
- Masrur Temples
- Meenakshi Temple
- Pattadakal
- Pandu Rajar Dhibi
- Pattanam (South India)
- Qutub Minar
- Rakhigarhi
- Rock edicts of Khalsi
- Rewari, site of a large hoard of copper artefacts
- Sanchi
- Sisupalgarh, Mauryan fort site
- Sugh Ancient Mound
- Sinauli
- Sujata Stupa
- Sivasagar
- Surkotada
- Thanjavur, important center of South Indian religion, art, and architecture. Most of the Great Living Chola Temples
- Tiruchirappalli
- Topra Kalan
- Unakoti
- Udayagiri Caves
- Vaishali
- Vikramshila
- keeladi
- kodumanal

== Indonesia ==
- Bada Valley
- Batujaya Archaeological Site
- Borobudur
- Bukit Kerang
- Gunung Padang Megalithic Site
- Pugung Raharjo
- Sangiran
- Trowulan
- Trinil

== Iraq ==
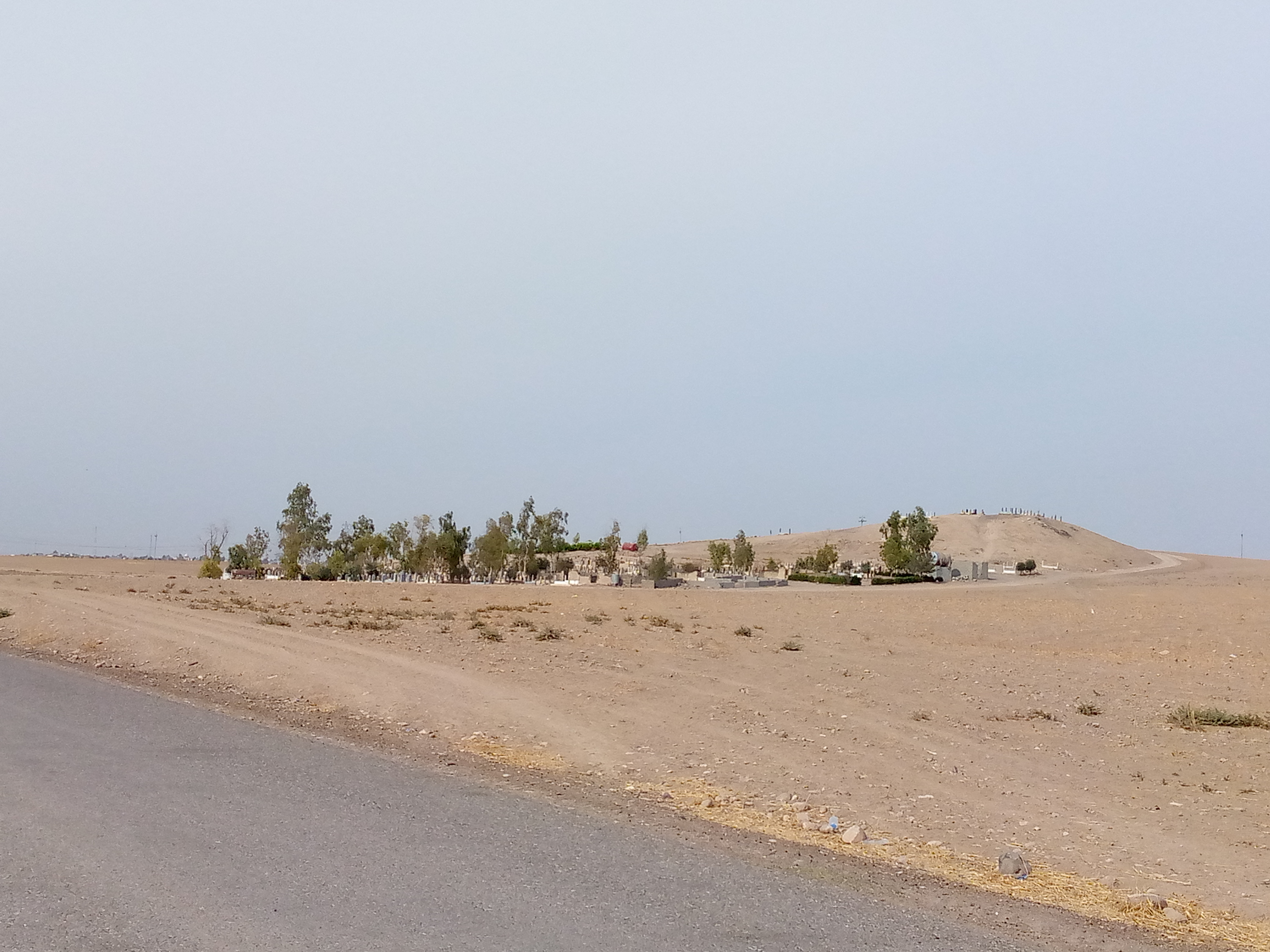
Kurd Qaburstan

- Kurd Qaburstan
- Al-Mada'in (Taq-i Kisra's ruins)
- Babylon
- Baghdad
- Bakr Awa
- Ginnig
- Gird-î Qalrakh
- Hatra
- Idu
- Isin
- Jarmo
- M'lefaat
- Mardaman
- Nemrik 9
- Nimrud
- Nineveh
- Puzrish-Dagan
- Samarra
- Shanidar
- Tell Abada
- Tell al-Fakhar
- Tell Bazmusian
- Tell Begum
- Tell el-'Oueili
- Tell Madhur
- Tell Rashid
- Tell Shemshara
- Ur

== Republic of Ireland ==
- Brennanstown Portal Tomb
- Brownshill dolmen
- Creevykeel Court Tomb
- Dowth
- Grianan of Aileach
- Hill of Tara
- Innisfallen Abbey
- Kilcrea Friary
- Knowth
- Monasterboice
- Newgrange
- Trim Castle
- Carrowmore
- Miosgán Medhbh
- Seefin Passage Tomb
- Skellig Michael

== Israel and Palestine ==
- Al-Moghraqa
- Al-Saqqa House
- Anthedon
  - Blakhiya Byzantine cemetery
- Antipatris
- Ard-al-Moharbeen necropolis
- Arsuf (Apollonia)
- Ashkelon
- Avdat
- Arbel
- Atlit fortress
- Anim, Israel
- Bar'am Synagogue
- Barquq Castle
- Beit Alpha
- Beit Guvrin
- Bethsaida
- Beth Shean (Scythopolis)
- Beth She'arim
- Belvoir Fortress
- Bureij mosaic
- Byzantine Church of Jabalia
- Caesarea Maritima
- Capernaum
- Chorazin
- Ein Hemed
- Ein Gedi
- Ekron
- Et-Tell
- Gaza synagogue
- Gezer
- Gibeon
- Hamat Tiberias
- Haluza
- Hebron
- Herodium
- Hippos
- Tell es-Sultan (Jericho)
  - Hisham's Palace
- Jerusalem (Western Wall Tunnel, City of David, Pool of Bethesda, Southern Wall excavations and its Jerusalem pilgrim road and many more in the Old City of Jerusalem and outside the old city...)
- Khirbat al-Minya
- Khirbet al-Ra’i
- Khirbet Kerak
- Khirbet Qeiyafa
- Lachish
- Laura of Euthymius
- Magdala
- Mamshit
- Masada
- Monastery of Martyrius
- Monastery of Seridus
- Montfort (castle)
- Mount Gerizim
- Neve David
- Nahal Me'arot Nature Reserve
- Qesem Cave
- Qumran
- Ramat Rahel
- Safed
- Sebastia
- Shivta
- Shuqba Cave
- Solomon's Pools
- Susiya
- White Mosque (Ramla)
- Taur Ikhbeineh
- Tell Abu Hawam
- Tell el-Ajjul
- Tel Arad
- Tell Balata
- Tel Be'er Sheva
- Tel Dan
- Tell el-Hesi
- Tel Hazor
- Tel Megiddo
- Tel Michal
- Tell Ruqeish
- Tell es-Sakan
- Tel Shilo
- Tel Shikmona
- Tell Umm el-'Amr/Saint Hilarion Monastery
- Temple Mount
- Timnah
- Tomb of Samuel
- Sepphoris
- Ubeidiya
- Yavneh-Yam
- Yodfat
- Zofor Domri Mosque

== Italy ==
- Agrigento
- Agrigentum
- Alba Fucens
- Amiternum
- Asti
- Brescia
- Calabria
- Campania
- Catania
- Caulonia
- Corfinium
- Croton
- Erice
- Forum Romanum
- Forlì – Monte Poggiolo
- Giardini Naxos
- Herculaneum
- Isernia La Pineta
- Juvanum
- Lazio
- Locri
- Lucus Angitiae
- Mount Bibele
- Morgantina
- Mozia
- Necropolis of Anghelu Ruju
- Necropolis of Fossa
- Necropolis of Li Muri
- Nola-Croce del Papa
- Ocriticum
- Ostia Antica
- Paestum
- Palmi
- Peltuinum
- Piemonte
- Pompeii
- Rome
- Rhegion
- Sardinia
- Saepinum
- Sassi of Matera
- Segesta
- Selinunte
- Shrine of Hercules Curinus
- Sibari
- Sicily
- Siracusa
- Suasa
- Su Nuraxi di Barumini
- Taormina
- Tauriana
- Turin
- Tusculum
- Trapani
- Val Camonica
- Villa Romana del Casale
- Veleia, Piacenza

== Japan ==
- Fukui cave
- Ichijōdani Asakura Family Historic Ruins
- Iwajuku
- Ōzuka Kofun
- Sannai-Maruyama
- Senpukuji Cave
- Yoshinogari

== Kazakhstan ==
- Issyk kurgan
- Otrar
- Petrovka settlement
- Türkistan

== Kyrgyzstan ==
- Balasagun
- Burana
- Issyk Kul
- Qoshoy Qorgon
- Suyab
- Tash Rabat
- Uzgen

== Kuwait ==
- Agarum
- Bahra 1
- H3 (Kuwait)

== Lebanon ==
- Sidon
- Tyre
- Aadloun
- Anjar, Lebanon
- Aaiha
- Aammiq
- Aaqbe
- Afqa
- Ain Aata
- Ain Harcha
- Akbiyeh
- Akkar plain foothills
- Al-Bireh, Rashaya
- Amioun
- Amlaq Qatih
- Anjar, Lebanon
- Antelias Cave
- Ard Saouda
- Ard Tlaili
- Arqa
- Arsal
- At Tiri
- Baalbek
- Baidar ech Chamout
- Bakka, Lebanon
- Batroumine
- Bechamoun
- Beit Mery
- Bodai
- Canalizations of Zenobia
- Cardo Decumanus Crossing
- Colonnaded Street
- Bustan Birke
- Dahr El Ahmar
- Dakoue
- Darbechtar
- Deir El Aachayer
- Deir el Ahmar
- Dekwaneh
- Douwara
- Duris, Lebanon
- Flaoui
- Jabal es Saaïdé
- Jbaa
- Jdeideh
- Jebel Aabeby
- Jeita Grotto
- Joub Jannine
- Kafr Zabad
- Kamid al lawz
- Kamouh el Hermel
- Karak Nuh
- Kaukaba
- Kefraya
- Kfar Abida
- Kfar Qouq
- Kfar Tebnit
- Kfarhata
- Khallet el Hamra
- Khallet Michte
- Khirbet El-Knese
- Ksar Akil
- Labweh
- Lake Qaraoun
- Libbaya
- Lion Tower
- Majdal Anjar
- Mansourieh
- Maqne
- Maronite mummies
- Mayrouba
- Mdoukha
- Monastery of Saint Maron
- Moukhtara
- Mtaileb
- Nabi Zair
- Nachcharini
- Nahle, Lebanon
- Neba'a Faour
- Nebi Safa
- Niha Bekaa
- Ourrouar
- Qaa
- Qal'at Bustra
- Qalaat Faqra
- Qalaat Tannour
- Qaraoun
- Qasr Chbib
- Qasr el Banat, Lebanon
- Ras al-Ain, Lebanon
- Ras Baalbek I
- Ras Beirut
- Ras El Kelb
- Rashaya
- Riha Station
- Riyaq
- Rmeileh
- Sands of Beirut
- Saraain El Faouqa
- Sarepta
- Sawiri, Lebanon
- Shheem
- Sidon
- Sin el Fil
- Tahun ben Aissa
- Tayibe (Lebanon)
- Tell Aalaq
- Tell Ain Cerif
- Tell Ain el Meten
- Tell Ain Ghessali
- Tell Ain Nfaikh
- Tell Ain Saouda
- Tell Ayoub
- Tell Deir
- Tell Delhamieh
- Tell Derzenoun
- Tell Dibbine
- Tell Ed Deir
- Tell El Ghassil
- Tell el-Burak
- Tell Hoch Rafqa
- Tell Jezireh
- Tell Jisr
- Tell Karmita
- Tell Khardane
- Tell Kirri
- Tell Mekhada
- Tell Mureibit
- Tell Neba'a Chaate
- Tell Neba'a Litani
- Tell Qasr Labwe
- Tell Rasm El Hadeth
- Tell Rayak
- Tell Shaikh Hassan al Rai
- Tell Shamsine
- Tell Zeitoun
- Tell Zenoub
- Temnin el-Foka
- Temple of Eshmun
- Toron
- Tyre Hippodrome
- Tyre Necropolis
- Tyre, Lebanon
- Wadi Koura
- Wadi Yaroun
- Yammoune
- Yanta, Lebanon
- Ain W Zain
- Zahlé

== Libya ==
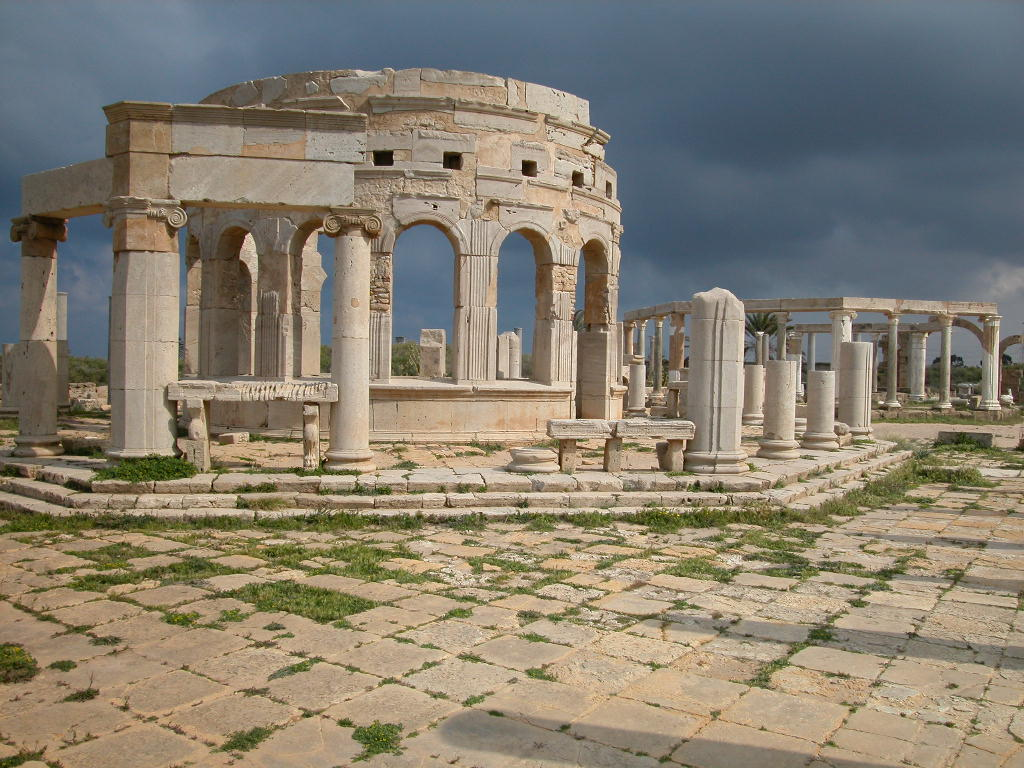
Archaeological Site of Leptis Magna

- Leptis Magna
- Cyrene
- Apollonia
- Sabratha
- Tripoli Medina
- Germa
- Derna Medina
- Ghadames Medina
- Benghazi Ottoman Palace
- Waddan Fortress
- Tolmeita
- Knightsbridge War Cemetery
- Stone art of Tadrart Acacus
- Giarabub
- Oea
- Marmarica
- Kyrenaika

== Malaysia ==
- Niah Caves
- Kota Tampan
- Lenggong
- Bujang Valley
- Sungai Batu

== Mali ==
- Timbuktu
- Djenne

== Malta ==
- Clapham Junction – cart ruts
- Ġgantija Temples – listed as a UNESCO World Heritage Site
- Ħaġar Qim Temples – listed as a UNESCO World Heritage Site
- Hypogeum of Ħal-Saflieni – prehistoric subterranean structure listed as a UNESCO World Heritage Site
- Mnajdra Temples – listed as a UNESCO World Heritage Site
- Tarxien Temples – listed as a UNESCO World Heritage Site
- Xagħra Stone Circle

== Mexico ==
- Acaneh
- Acanmul
- Achiutla
- Acozac (archaeological site)
- Ake
- Almuchil
- Altar de los Reyes
- Altavista petroglyph complex
- Anayte'
- El Amparo (archaeological site)
- El Arbolillo
- El Azuzul
- Balakbal
- Balamku
- Balankanche
- Balcón de Montezuma
- Becan
- Bellote
- Bolonchén
- Bonampak
- Cacaxtla
- Calakmul
- Calixtlahuaca
- Calotmul
- La Campana (archaeological site)
- Candelaria Cave
- Cansacbe
- Cantona (Mesoamerican site)
- Cañada de la Virgen
- Capacha
- Casa de la Cacica
- Castillo de Teayo (Mesoamerican site)
- Cempoala
- Cenotillo
- El Cerrito (archaeological site)
- Cerro de la Estrella (archaeological site)
- Cerro de las Mesas
- Cerro de las Minas
- Cerro Juanaqueña
- Chac II
- Chacchoben
- Chacmultun
- Chactun
- Chakalal
- Chakanbakan
- Chalcatzingo
- Chalchihuites
- El Chanal
- Chiapa de Corzo (Mesoamerican site)
- Chicanna
- Chichen Itza
- Chichmul
- El Chicozapote
- Chimalhuacán (archaeological site)
- Chinikiha
- Chinkultic
- Cholula (Mesoamerican site)
- Chuctiepa
- Chunchucmil
- Chunhuhub
- Chunlimon
- Chunkunab
- Chupicuaro
- Coatetelco
- Coba
- Comalcalco
- Comitan
- El Conde
- El Coporo
- Cozumel
- El Cuajilote
- Cuarenta Casas
- Cuauhtinchan
- Cuca, Mexico
- Cueva de las Jarillas
- Cueva De Las Ventanas
- Cueva de Oxtotitlan
- Cuicuilco
- Culuba
- Cutzamala (Mesoamerican site)
- Cuyuxquihui
- Dainzú
- Dzehkabtun
- Dzekilna
- Dzibanche
- Dzibilchaltun
- Dzibilnocac
- Dzibiltun
- Dzilam
- Dzitbalche
- Dzula
- Edzna
- Ek' Balam
- El Encanto
- Etlatongo
- La Ferreria
- Flor de Mayo
- Frightful Cave
- Gheo-shih
- Guachimontones
- Guaquitepec
- Guiengola
- Hacienda Hotzuc
- Halakal
- Halal
- Haltunchon
- Hoboyna
- Hochop
- Holactun
- Hormiguero
- Hotzuc
- Huamango
- Huamelulpan (archaeological site)
- Huandacareo
- Huapalcalco
- Huápoca
- Huatusco (archaeological site)
- Hunanhil
- Huntichmul
- Huntichmul II
- Ichkabal
- Ichmac
- Ichmul
- Ichpaatun
- Ichpich
- Los Idolos
- Ihuatzio
- Ikil (Maya site)
- Isla de Jaina
- Isla de Piedras
- Isla Uaymil
- Itzamkanac
- Ixcateopan
- Ixil (Maya site)
- Ixtelha
- Ixtlan del Rio (archaeological site)
- Izamal
- Izapa
- Jolja'
- Jonuta
- La Joya
- Juxtlahuaca
- Kabah (Maya site)
- Kana
- Kanki
- Kinich
- Kakmo
- Kintunich
- Kantunil Kin
- Kayal (Maya site)
- Kiuic
- Kohunlich
- Komchen
- Kukab
- Kuluba
- Labna
- Lacanha
- Laguna de los Cerros
- Lambityeco
- Loltun
- Las Bocas
- Las Choapas
- Las Flores (archaeological site)
- Las Ranas
- Malpasito
- Managua (Maya site)
- El Manatí
- Mani
- La Mar
- Mario Ancona (Maya site)
- Matacapan
- Maxcanu
- Mayapan
- El Meco
- Mesa de Cacahuatenco
- Miraflores
- Misantla
- Mitla
- Mocu
- La Mojarra
- Monte Albán
- Mopila
- Moral Reforma
- Mul chic
- Muluch Tsekal
- La Muñeca
- Muyil
- Nakaskat
- Ndaxagua
- Nicolas Bravo (Maya site)
- Nocuchich
- Nohpat
- Ojo de Agua (Maya site)
- Okop
- El Opeño
- Organera Xochipala
- Otompan
- Oxcutzcab
- Oxkintok
- Oxlahuntun
- Oxpemul
- Oxtankah
- Oxtotitlán
- El Pabellon
- Padre Piedra
- Palace of Cortés, Cuernavaca
- Palenque
- El Palmar (Chiapas)
- El Palmar (Quintana Roo)
- El Palmillo
- Panhale
- Paquime
- Paso de la Amada
- Pechal
- Peralta (Mesoamerican site)
- Pestac
- Piedra Labrada
- La Pintada (archaeological site)
- El Pital (Veracruz)
- Pixoy
- Plazuelas
- Pomoná
- Pomuch
- Potonchán
- La Proveedora
- Punta Sur (Cozumel)
- Puuc
- La Quemada
- Quiahuiztlan
- El Quirambal
- Remojadas
- El Resbalon
- El Retiro (Maya site)
- El Rey (Maya site)
- Río Bec
- Río Michol
- Sabacche
- Sabakalal
- Sacchana
- San Andrés (Mesoamerican site)
- San Claudio (Maya site)
- Sacnicte
- San Gervasio (Maya site)
- San José Mogote
- San Lorenzo (Campeche)
- San Lorenzo (Chiapas)
- San Lorenzo Tenochtitlán
- San Miguel Ixtapan (archaeological site)
- San Pablo Huitzo
- Santa Cecilia Acatitlan
- Santa Elena (Maya site)
- Santa Rosa Xtampak
- Santoton
- Sayil
- Sihó
- Silvituc
- Simojovel
- Sisilha
- La Soledad de Maciel
- Suchilquitongo (archaeological site)
- T'Ho
- El Tabasqueño
- Tabi
- El Tajín
- Tamaulipas early agricultural site.
- Tancah
- Tapachula
- Techoh
- Tecoaque
- Telantunich
- Templo Mayor
- Tenam Puente
- Tenam Rosario
- Tenayuca
- Tenochtitlan
- Teopantecuanitlan
- Teopanzolco
- Teotenango
- Teotihuacan
- Tepatlaxco (Mesoamerican site)
- Tepcatan
- Tepeticpac
- Los Tepoltzis
- El Tepozteco
- El Teul
- Tila
- Tingambato
- Tipikal
- Tizatlan
- Tlapacoya
- Tlatelolco
- Tlatilco
- Tohcok
- Tollan
- Tonalá (Maya site)
- Toniná
- Tortuguero (Maya site)
- Tres Zapotes
- Tula
- Tulum
- Tunkuyi
- Tututepec
- Tzendales
- Tzibanche
- Tzintzuntzan (Mesoamerican site)
- Tzocchen
- Tzum
- Uaymil
- Uci (Maya site)
- Uitzina
- Ukum
- La Union
- Uxmal
- El Vallecito
- La Venta
- Xaltocan
- Xbalche
- Xcalumkin
- Xcambo
- Xcaret
- Xcocha
- Xcochkax
- Xcoh
- Xcorralche
- Xcucsuc
- Xculoc
- Xel Ha
- Xicalango
- Xkalachetzimin
- Xkichmook
- Xkipche
- Xkombec
- Xkukican
- Xlapak
- Xnucbec
- Xochicalco
- Xochipila
- Xochitecatl
- Xpujil
- Xtobo
- Xul
- Xupa
- Yaaxhom
- Yagul
- Yakalmai
- Yalcabakal
- Yaxche-Xlabpak
- Yaxchilan
- Yaxcopoil
- Yaxuna
- Yo'okop
- Yucuita
- Yula
- Zaachila
- El Zapotal
- Zazacatla
- Zohapilco

== Micronesia ==
- Nan Madol
- Chuuk

== Moldova ==
- Athanaric's Wall
- Old Orhei
- Upper Trajan's Wall

== Mongolia ==
- Khoid Tsenkheriin Agui (Northern Cave of Blue), Paleolithic cave drawings
- Tsagaan Agui (White Cave), Paleolithic cave drawings
- Kharakhorum, capital of the Mongolian Empire

== Montenegro ==
- Municioium S...

See also:Heritage museum Pljevlja

== Morocco ==
- Lixus
- Tamuda
- Volubilis
- Thamusida
- Iulia Valentia Banasa
- Sala Colonia
- Anfa
- Msoura
- Jebel Irhoud
- Ahl al Oughlam
- Thymiaterium
- Taforalt

== Netherlands ==
- Hunebed

== New Zealand ==
- Albert Park tunnels – World War II civilian air raid shelters sealed in 1946
- Te Wairoa – "The Buried Village", a Maori village buried by volcanic eruption in 1886
- Wairau Bar – rivermouth site of pre-European Maori settlement
- Huriawa Peninsula - Te Pa a Te Wera, reserve and archaeological sites
- Motutapu Island - Site of many settlements and early Maori manufacturing

== North Macedonia ==
- Ohrid
- Stobi
- Heraclea Lyncestis
- Vardarski Rid
- Astibo
- Bargala
- Scupi
- Bryanium
- Damastion
- Styberra
- Viničko Kale
- Veluška Tumba
- Tumba Madžari
- Trebeništa
- Isar
- St. Erasmus Cave Church
- Samuel's Fortress
- Kokino
- Golem Grad
- Alcomenae
- Church of St. John at Kaneo
- Stena
- Estipeon
- Marko's Towers
- Skopje Aqueduct
- Skopje Fortress
- Plaošnik
- Strumica Fortress
- Bonče
- Bučin
- Alcomenae
- Idomenae
- Cerje
- Tauresium
- Prosek
- Kuklica
- Bylazora
- Peshta Fortress
- Antania
- Bara Tumba
- Gordynia
- Cocev Kamen
- Kočani medieval towers
- Ancient Theatre
- Mančevci site

== Norway ==
- Borg in Lofoten, Viking Age longhouse site
- Borre mound cemetery, cemetery from the Merovingian period to the Viking Age
- Gokstad ship burial
- Oseberg ship burial
- Tune ship burial

== Palau ==
- Aimeliik Site

== Panama ==
- Monagrillo

== Papua New Guinea ==
- Kuk Swamp

== Philippines ==
- Anda Peninsula Petrographs of Eastern Bohol
- Angono Petroglyphs
- Alab Petroglyphs of Mountain Province
- Archaeological sites of the Prehistory of Sarangani
- Archaeology of Porac, Pampanga
- Balingasay Archaeological Site in Bolinao, Pangasinan
- Banton, Romblon
- Baroque Churches of the Philippines
- Butuan Archaeological Sites
- Balobok Cave
- Excavations at Calatagan
- Dewil Valley
- Fort Santiago, Manila
- Fort Pilar, Zamboanga
- Fort San Pedro, Cebu
- Griffin Shipwreck in Fort Pilar, Zamboanga city
- Guyangan Cave System
- Intramuros, the Walled City of Manila
- Ijang in Batanes
- Kabayan Mummy Burial Caves, Benguet
- Kalanay Cave and other archaeological sites at Masbate
- Kulaman Plateau, Cotabato
- Lapuz Lapuz Cave
- Lal-lo and Gattaran Shell Middens
- Lena Shoal wreck site
- Limestone tombs of Kamhantik at Buenavista Protected Landscape
- Maranao Settlement of Tugaya
- Novaliches Site
- Old Kiyyangan Village
- Old Tanauan Church Ruins
- Pamitaan Site, Solana, Cagayan
- Pandanan Shipwreck
- Pinagbayanan excavation
- Peñablanca Protected Landscape and Seascape
- Rice Terraces of the Philippine Cordilleras
- Rizal Archaeological Site
- San Diego (ship) at Nasugbu, Batangas
- Sheik Karimol Makhdum Mosque
- Spanish Colonial Fortifications of the Philippines
- Tau't bato Singnapan Caves Petrographs of southern Palawan
- Singhapala
- Sagada, Mountain Province
- Tabon Caves, Palawan

== Poland ==
- Biskupin Iron Age
- Giecz Middle Ages
- Krzemionki Opatowskie Neolith
- Odry Iron Age
- Ostrów Lednicki Middle Ages
- Otalążka near Grójec, possibly cult-related

== Portugal ==
- Abul
- Cabeço do Vouga
- Castro do Vieito
- Cemitério das Âncoras
- Muge Mesolithic Shell Middens
- Tróia
- Vila Nova de São Pedro
- Lapedo Child

== Qatar ==
- Al Da'asa
- Al Khor Island
- Jebel Jassassiyeh
- Murwab
- Ruwayda
- Umm Al Maa
- Wadi Debayan

== Romania ==
- Acidava (Enoşeşti) – Dacian, Roman
- Apulon (Piatra Craivii) – Dacian
- Apulum (Alba Iulia) – Roman, Dacian
- Argedava (Popeşti) – Dacian, possibly Burebista's court or capital
- Argidava (Vărădia) – Dacian, Roman
- Basarabi (Calafat) – Basarabi culture (8th – 7th centuries BC), related to Hallstatt culture
- Callatis (Mangalia) – Greek colony
- Capidava – Dacian, Roman
- Cernavodă – Cernavodă culture, Dacian
- Coasta lui Damian (Măerişte)
- Cucuteni – Cucuteni–Trypillia culture
- Dacian Fortresses of the Orăştie Mountains
- Drobeta – Roman
- Giurtelecu Şimleului
- Histria – Greek colony
- Lumea Noua (near Alba Iulia) – middle Neolithic to Chalcolithic
- Măgura Uroiului
- Napoca (Cluj-Napoca) – Dacian, Roman
- Noviodunum ad Istrum – Roman
- Peștera cu Oase – the oldest early modern human remains in Europe
- Porolissum (near Zalău) – Roman
- Potaissa (Turda) – Roman
- Sarmizegetusa Regia – Dacian capital
- Sarmizegetusa Ulpia Traiana – Roman capital of province of Dacia
- Trophaeum Traiani/Civitas Tropaensium (Adamclisi) – Roman
- Tomis (Constanţa) – Greek colony
- Ziridava/Şanţul Mare (Pecica) – Dacian, Pecica culture, 16 archaeological horizons have been distinguished, starting with the Neolithic and ending with the Feudal Age

== Russia ==
- Arkaim – Proto-Aryans
- Ignateva Cave – Site of Paleolithic cave painting
- Ipatovo – Proto-Indo-Europeans
- Krivoye Lake – Proto-Aryans
- Ladoga – Vikings/Rus'
- Mayatskoye – Saltovo-Mayaki culture
- Maykop – Proto-Indo-Europeans
- Pazyryk – Scythians
- Phanagoria – Ancient Greeks
- Sarkel – Khazars
- Sintashta – Proto-Aryans
- Tanais – Ancient Greeks
- Tmutarakan – Greeks/Khazars/Rus'
- Ubsunur Hollow – nomadic tribes such as the Scythians, the Turks and the Huns
- Veliky Novgorod – Vikings/Rus'

== Serbia ==
- Čurug
- Gamzigrad-Felix Romuliana (Zaječar)
- Horreum Margi (Ćuprija)
- Justiniana Prima (Serbian: Caričin Grad) (Mala Kopasnica)
- Kalemegdan (Belgrade)
- Lepenski Vir (Donji Milanovac)
- Mediana (Niš)
- Naissus (Niš)
- Petrovaradin Fortress
- Pločnik
- Remesiana (Bela Palanka)
- Risovačka Cave (Aranđelovac)
- Rudna Glava
- Singidunum (Belgrade)
- Sirmium (Sremska Mitrovica)
- Starčevo
- Taliata (Donji Milanovac)
- Taurunum (Zemun)
- Tašmajdan Park
- Trajan's Bridge
- Timacum Minus (Knjaževac)
- Viminacium (Kostolac)
- Ulpiana

== Saudi Arabia ==
- Mada'in Saleh
- Dumat Al-Jandal
- Marid Castle
- Tayma
- Diriyah
- Al-Balad, Jeddah
- Dosariyah
- Gerrha
- Pharaonic Tayma inscription
- Tomb of Eve
- Qaryat al-Faw
- Tarout Island
- Thaj
- Al-Shuwayḥaṭiyah
- Al-Ukhdūd
- Rock Art in the Ha'il Region
- Al-Rabadha
- Bir Hima Rock Petroglyphs and Inscriptions
- Al-'Ula
- Midian
- Thee Ain
- Souk Okaz

== Scotland ==
- Skara Brae
- Kilmartin Glen

== Somalia ==
- Surud mountain
- Gelweyto
- Laasgeel
- Maduna

== Slovenia ==
- Ptuj (Roman city Poetovio)
- Potok Cave (cave – Neolithic)
- Ljubljana Marsh (Bronze Age findings)
- Ljubljana (Roman city Emona)
- Vrhnika (World's oldest wheel)

== South Africa ==
- Blombos Cave
- Border Cave
- Cango Caves
- Coopers Cave
- Duinefontein
- Gladysvale Cave
- Hoedjiespunt
- Kathu Archaeological Sites
- Klasies River Caves
- Kromdraai fossil site
- Makapansgat
- Mapungubwe
- Motsetsi
- Plovers Lake
- Sterkfontein
- Swartkrans
- Sibudu Cave
- Taung, North West
- Wonderwerk Cave

== Spain ==
- Amaya, fortification
- Arcóbriga
- Baelo Claudia
- Bastida de Totana
- Bilbilis (Augusta Bilbilis)
- Calafell
- Cancho Roano
- Carthago Nova
- Castulo
- Cave of Altamira
- Cave of La Pasiega
- Caves of Valeron
- Chao Samartín
- Cova de les Dones
- Dolmen of Menga
- El Argar
- El Carambolo
- El Castillón
- El Maipés Necropolis
- Empúries
- Gavà Prehistoric Mines
- Italica
- Lancia
- Las Cogotas, castro.
- Las Médulas
- Los Millares
- Marroquines Bajos
- Medina Azahara
- Monte Bernorio
- Motilla de Azuer
- Numancia
- Olèrdola
- Painted Cave, Galdar
- Pancorbo, castillo.
- Pozo Moro
- Qart Hadasht
- Recópolis
- Salinas Espartinas
- Talayotic sites
- Tarraco
- Tito Bustillo Cave
- Torralba and Ambrona
- Turuñuelo
- Ullastret
- Villa de la Olmeda
- Vascos, medīna

== Sri Lanka ==
- Abhayagiri vihāra
- Anuradhapura
- Avukana Buddha statue
- Belilena
- Buduruvagala
- Deegavapi Raja Maha Viharaya
- Dematamal viharaya
- Fa Hien Cave
- Gal Vihara
- Godavaya
- Hunugalagala Limestone Cave
- Kaludiya Pokuna Forest
- Maligawila
- Polonnaruwa
- Rajagala
- Sigiriya
- Thanthirimale
- Waulpane
- Yudaganawa

== Sultanate of Oman ==
- Abayah Wadi Suq graves
- al-Akhdhar settlement and burial area
- al-Amqat Early and Late Iron Age burial ground
- al-Batin 1 Late Iron Age burials
- al-Bustan burial ground
- al-Feg, Siya, W. Sarin Early and Late Iron Age cemetery
- al-Jawabi trilith site
- Al-Khawdh Early and Late Iron Age cemetery
- al-Moyassar multi-period graves, settlement, copper production
- al-Nejd, Sultanate of Oman Late Iron Age fortified settlement
- al-Raki settlement and copper production
- al-Rustaq, al- multi-period settlement and burial area
- al-Salayli, archaeological site|al-Salayli, multi-period burial and metal-producing site
- al-Saruj Late Iron Age grave
- al-Shariq 2 trilith site
- al-Wasit Late Bronze Age settlement and burial area
- Amla/al-Fuwaydah Pre-Islamic recent period burial ground
- Bandar Jissa 1 Late Iron Age cemetery
- Bawshar settlement and burial area
- Bimmah Early Iron Age settlement and cemetery
- Hamra Kahf Late Iron Age graves
- Ibra I052 Late Iron Age fortified settlement
- Ibri/Selme tombs, Early Iron Age metal hoard
- Izki settlement and burial area
- Jebel al-Hammah, trilith site
- Jebel Sunsunah Late Iron Age fortified settlement
- Khadhra Bani Daffa Mustagh Late Iron Age cemetery
- Khor Rori 1st century CE Hadhramaut fortified settlement
- Lizq fortified mountain Early Iron Age settlement
- Mahaliya multi-period pre-Islamic cemeteries
- Muscat Christian burials
- Muti, Tawi al-Alayah Late Iron Age cemetery
- Mudhmar Early Iron Age sanctuary
- Negda Madirah Late Iron Age fortified settlement
- Qaryat al-Saiḥ Late Iron Age and Muslim period fortified settlement, graves
- Ras al-Hadd multi-period settlement and burial area
- Ras al-Jins multi-period settlement and burial area
- Sabt Saite Early and Late Iron Age graves and fort
- Samad al-Shan multi-period settlement, cemetery
- Samail, al-Baruni 1 Pre-Islamic recent period burial
- Sinaw SNW1 T58 Late Iron Age graves
- Suhar Early and Late Iron Age settlement and cemeteries
- Shenah Late Iron Age cemetery, possible trilith
- Shir, Oman Bronze Age burial ground
- Tiwi tw0002 Late Iron Age fortified settlement
- ʿUmq al-Rabaḫ Late Iron Age settlement and burial area
- ʿUqdat al-Bakrah Early Iron Age metal-working site
- Wadi Sahtan rock art and inscriptions
- Yanqul multi period burials
- Yiti Wadi Suq burials

== Sweden ==
- Adelsö
- Alby
- Birka
- Gamla Uppsala
- Gene fornby
- Helgö
- Sigtuna
- Uppåkra
- Valsgärde
- Vasa (ship)
- Vendel

== Switzerland ==
- Augusta Raurica
- Aventicum (Avenches)
- La Tène, Iron Age
- Vindonissa (Windisch)

== Syria ==
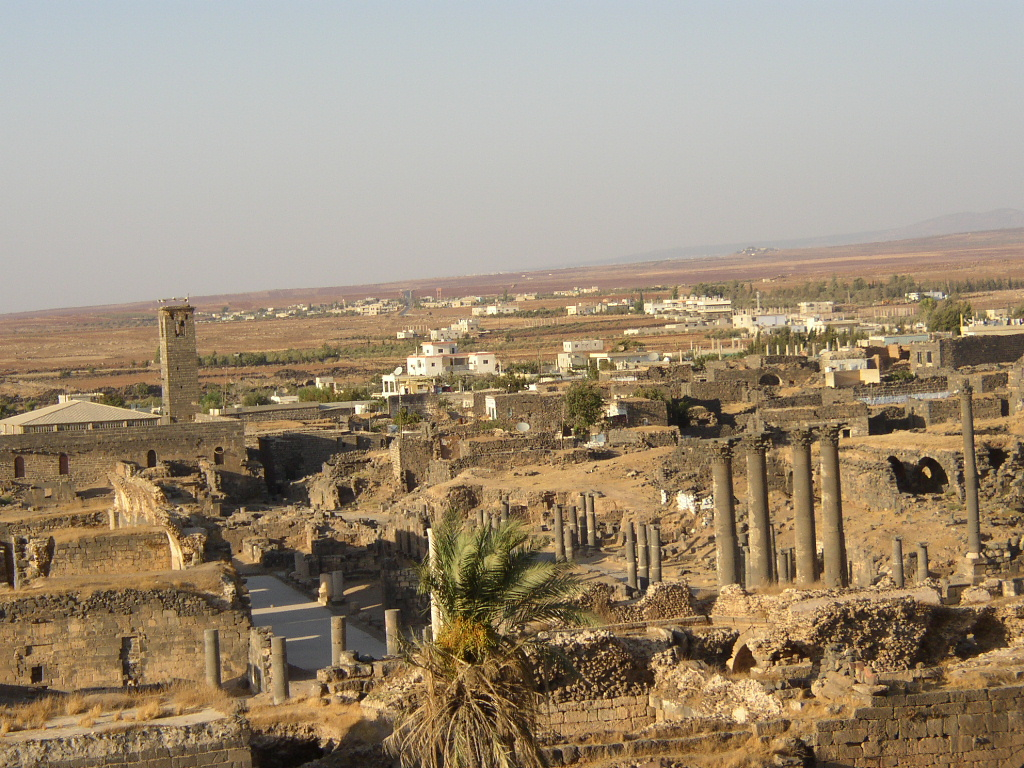
Ancient City of Bosra

- Al-Rawda
- Apamea
- Bosra
- Chagar Bazar
- Dibsi Faraj
- Ebla
- Halabiye
- Mari
- Mureybet
- Palmyra
- Qatna
- Tell Abu Hureyra
- Tell Arbid
- Tell Barri
- Tell Beydar
- Tell Brak
- Tell Chuera
- Tell Fray
- Tell Halaf
- Tell Hamoukar
- Tell Kashkashok
- Tell Leilan
- Tell Mozan
- Ugarit
- Zalabiye

== Tanzania ==
- Kilwa Kisiwani
- Olduvai Gorge

== Taiwan ==
- Beinan Cultural Park
- Dulan Site
- Fengbitou Archaeological Site
- Huilai Monument Archaeology Park
- Niumatou Site

== Thailand ==
- Ban Chiang
- Ban Non Wat
- Ayutthaya Historical Park

== Tunisia ==
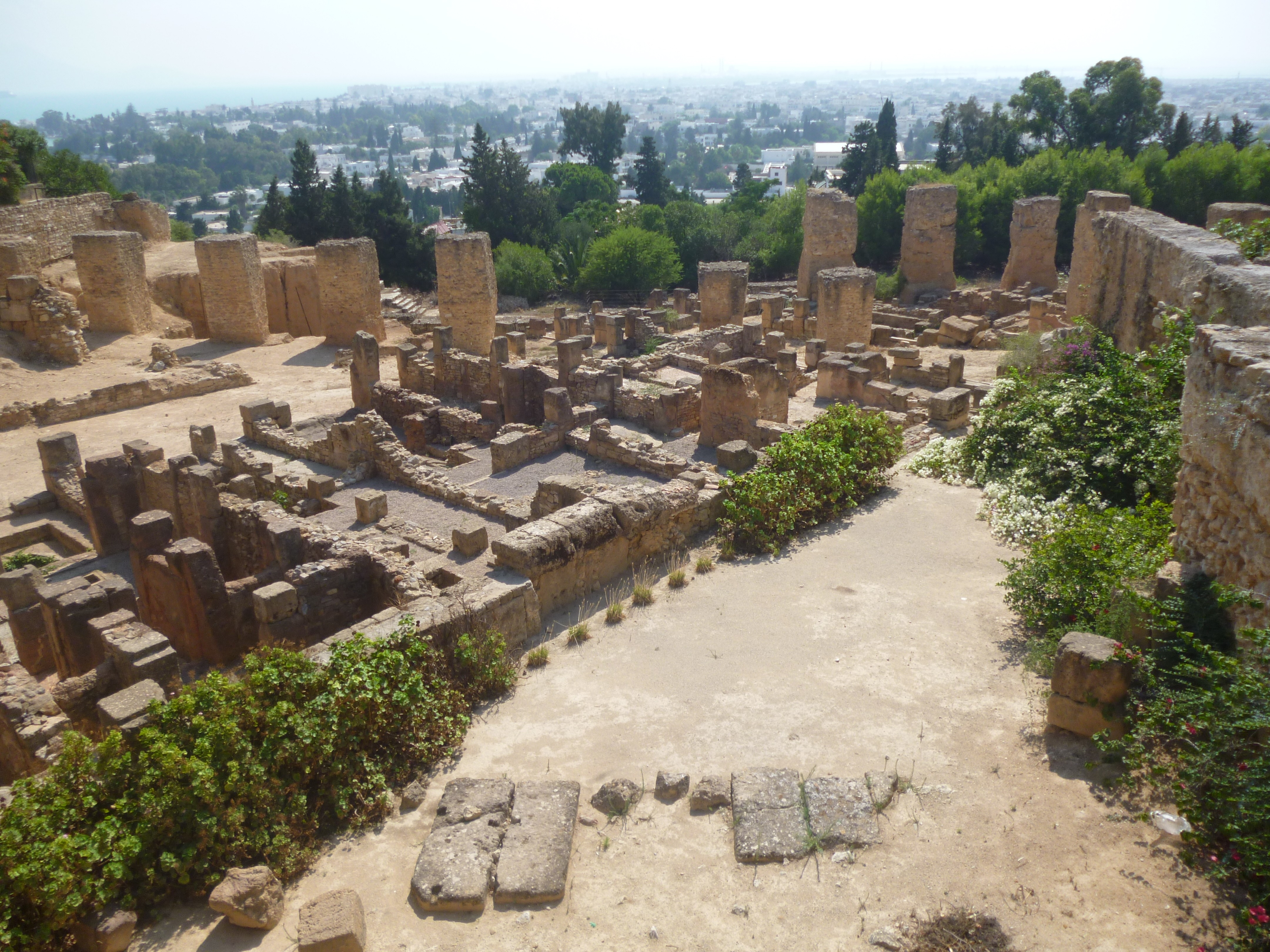
Archaeological Site of Carthage

- ad-turres (byzacena)
- Aeliae
- Aptuca
- Aquae in Byzacena
- Aquae Regiae
- Ausafa
- Autenti
- Auzegera
- Beni Otsmane
- Bennefa
- Bir-Abdallah
- Borj Gourbata
- Botriana
- Cabarsussi
- Carthage
- Cebarades
- Chemtou
- Chusira
- Crepedula
- Cufruta
- Culusi
- Djerba
- Douela
- Drâa-Bellouan
- Dzemda
- Edistiana
- Egnatia, Byzacena
- El Brij, Tunisia
- El Kenissia
- El-Haria
- Eles, Tunisia
- Enfidha
- Feradi Minus
- Filaca
- Foratiana
- Gratiana, Africa
- Henchir-Bir-El-Menadla
- Henchir Chigarnia
- Henchir-Sidi-Salah
- Henchir-Boucha
- Henchir Ziane
- Meninx

== Turkey ==
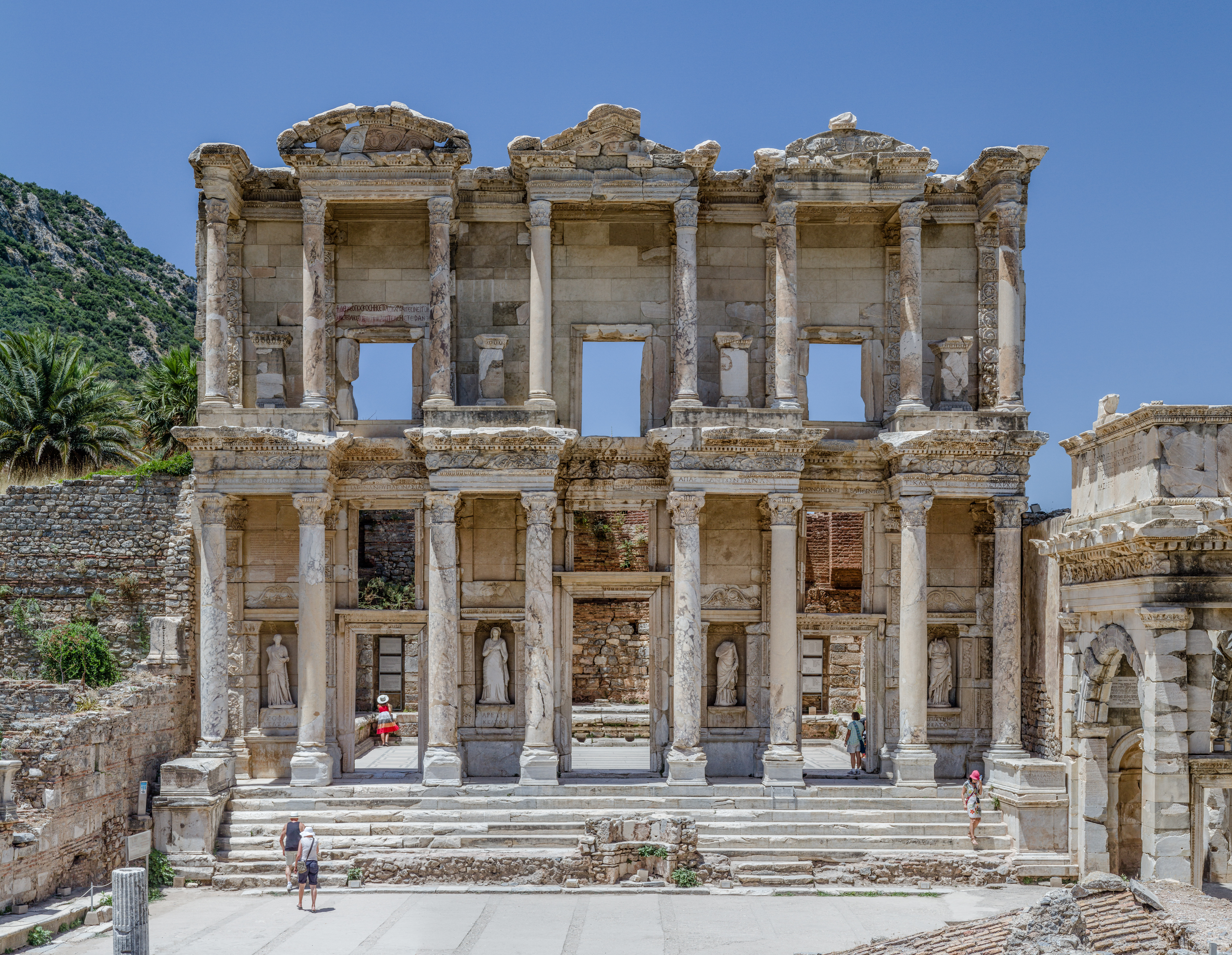
Library of Celsus in Ephesus

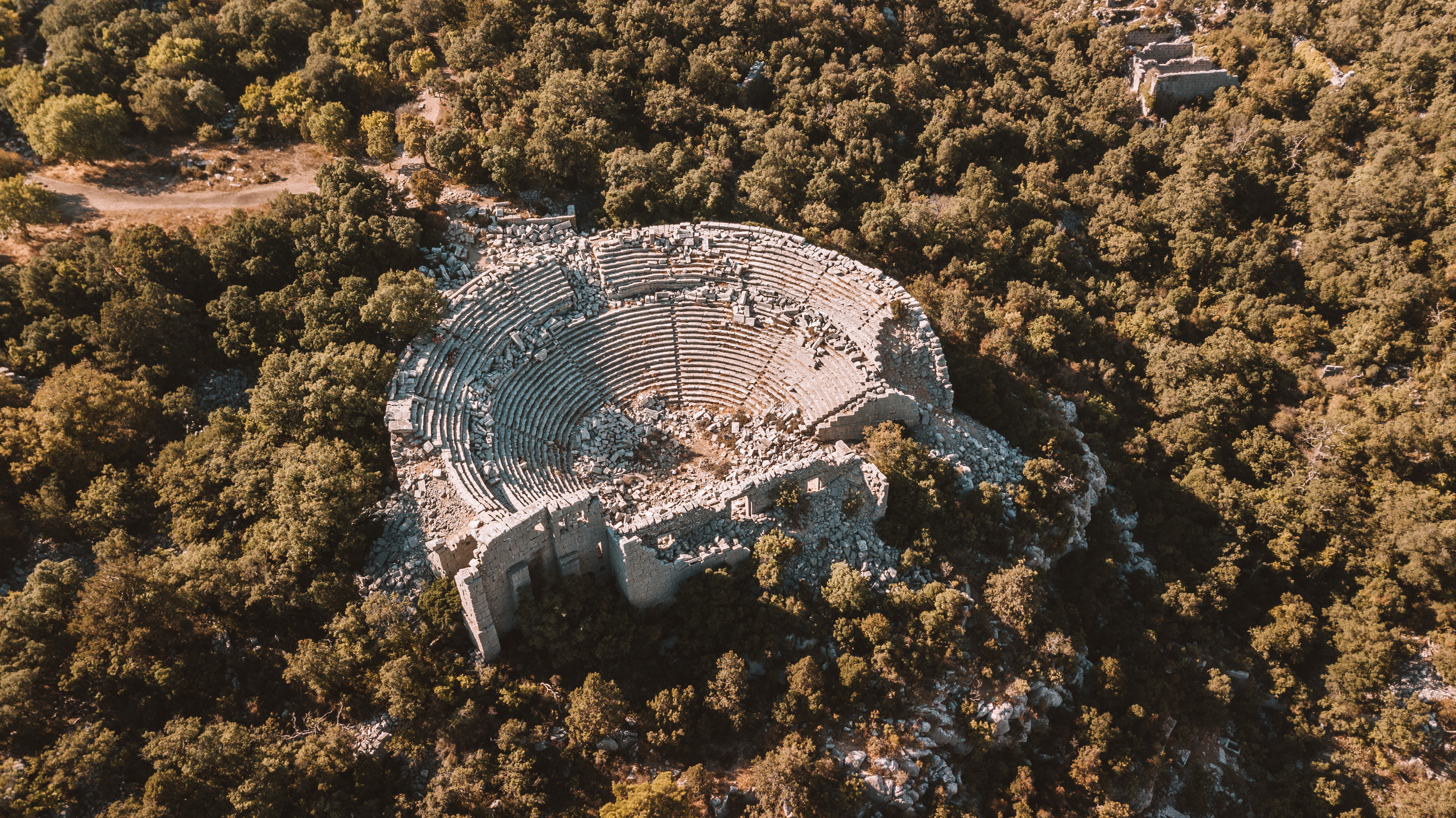
Mount Güllük-Termessos National Park in Antalya

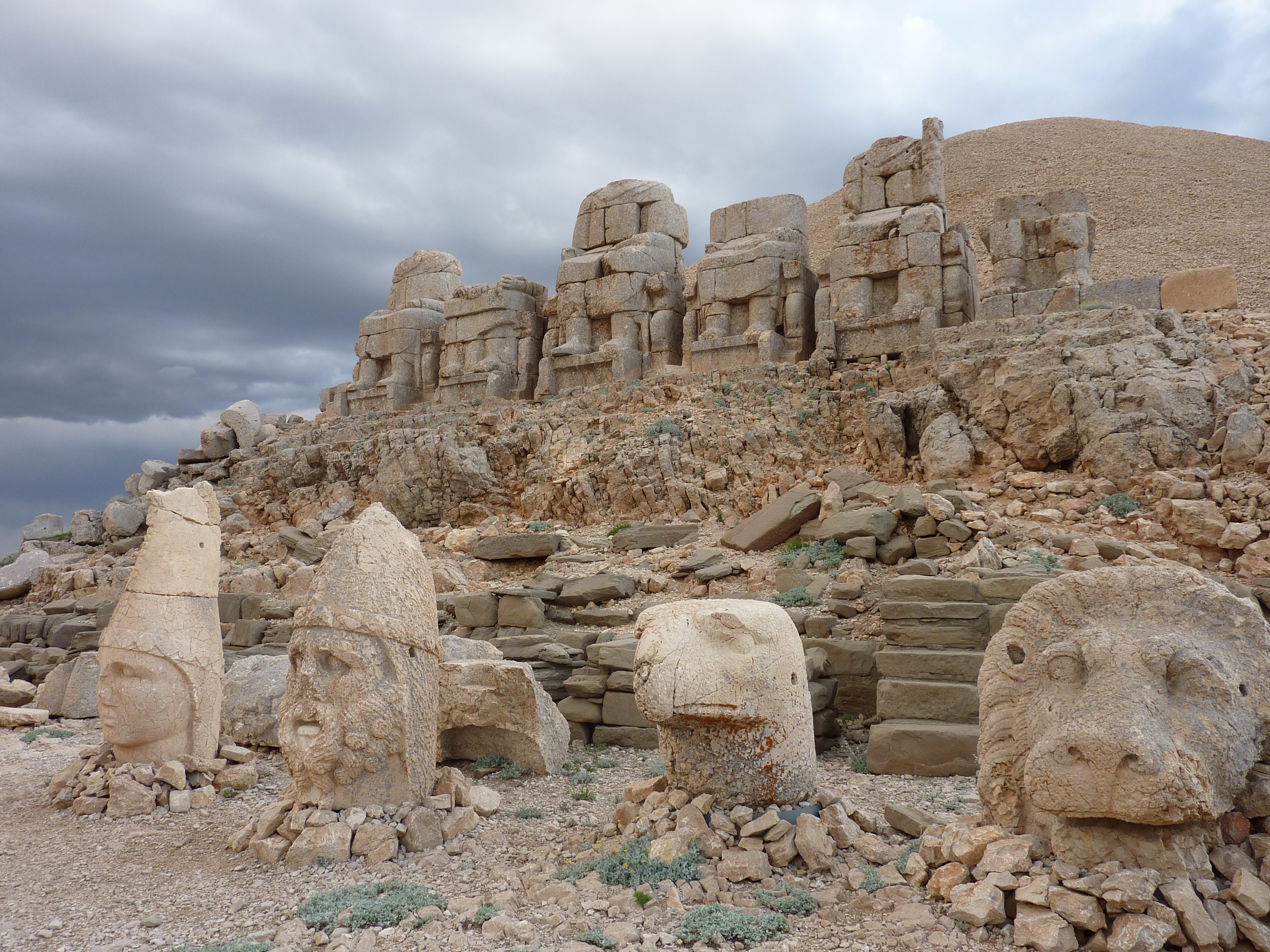
Statues of Mount Nemrut in Eastern Turkey

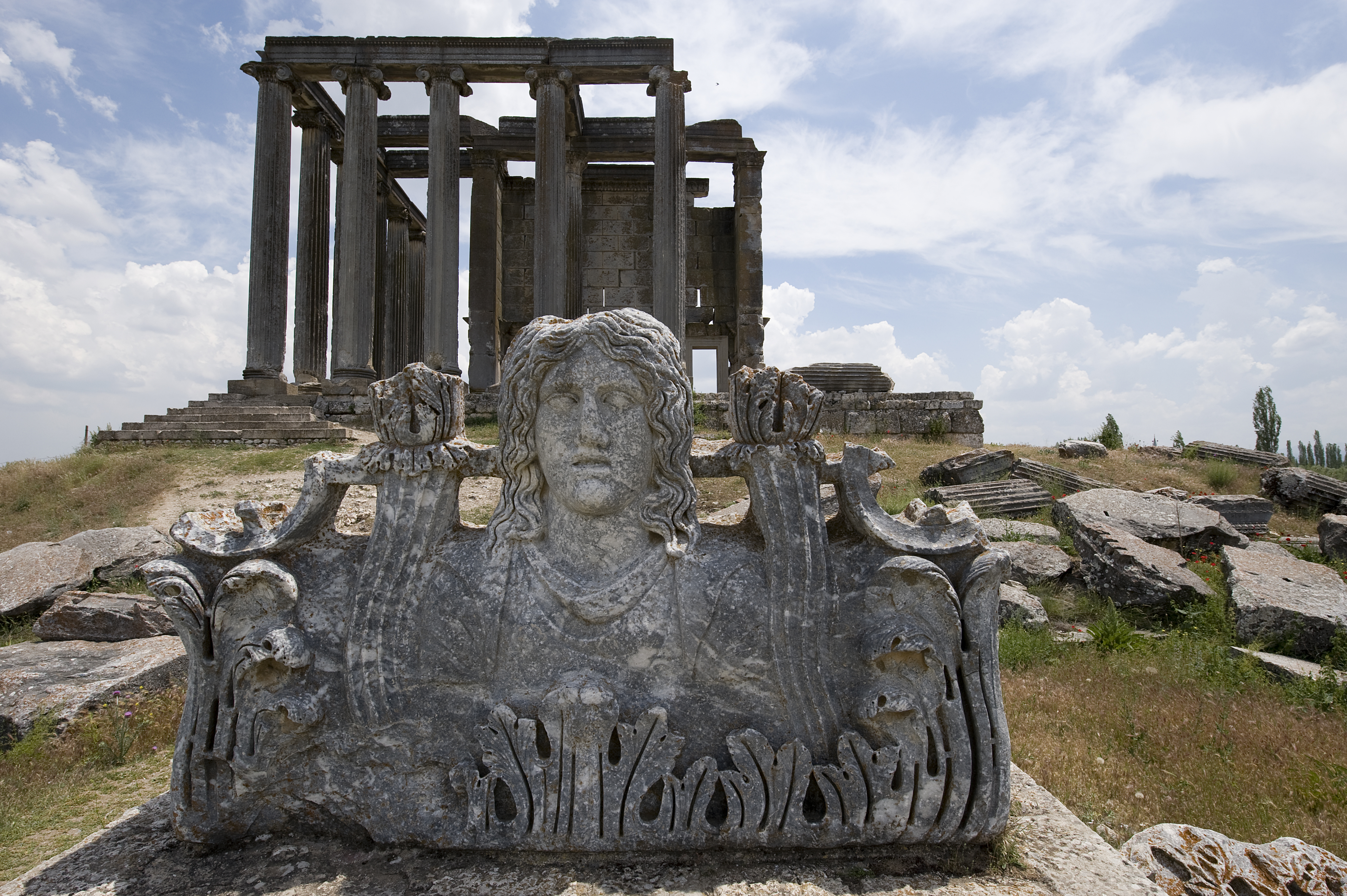
Zeus Temple in Aizanoi

- Aegospotami
- Aigai (Aeolian)
- Aizanoi
- Akalissos
- Akdamar Island
- Akhisar
- Alabanda
- Alaca Höyük
- Alahan Monastery
- Alalakh
- Alexandria ad Issum
- Alexandria Troas
- Alinda (Caria)
- Alişar Hüyük
- Allianoi
- Altıntepe
- Amida (Roman city)
- Amorium
- Amos (ancient city)
- Amuk, Antakya
- Amyzon
- Anastasian Wall
- Anazarbus
- Anemurium
- Ani
- Antandrus
- Antigoneia (Syria)
- Antioch
- Antioch on the Maeander
- Antioch, Pisidia
- Antiochia Lamotis
- Antiochia ad Cragum
- Antiochia ad Pyramum
- Antiochia ad Taurum
- Antiochia, Lydia
- Antiphellus
- Apamea (Euphrates)
- Apamea (Phrygia)
- Apamea Myrlea
- Aphrodisias
- Aphrodisias of Cilicia
- Apollon Lermenos
- Apollonia ad Rhyndacum
- Apollonia (Mysia)
- Apollonia Salbace
- Apros
- Arap Mosque
- Ariassos
- Arslantepe
- Arycanda
- Arzashkun
- Arzawa
- Aspendos
- Assos
- Atarneus
- Attalia
- Attuda
- Aytap
- Basilinopolis
- Balboura
- Beşparmak Mountains
- Beycesultan
- Blaundos
- Bybassios
- Cape Gelidonya
- Carchemish
- Cardia (Thrace)
- Caryanda
- Cebrene
- Celaenae
- Cennet and Cehennem
- Ceramus
- Chalcedon
- Cius
- Claudiopolis
- Claros
- Cleopatra's Gate
- Colophon (city)
- Colossae
- Comana (Cappadocia)
- Comana Pontica
- Coracesium
- Corycus
- Cremna, Pisidia
- Cyrrhus, Turkey
- Cyaneae
- Cyme (Aeolis)
- Cyzicus
- Çatalhöyük Neolithic
- Çayönü
- Derbe
- Digda
- Didyma
- Diokaisarea
- Docimium
- Doliche Gaziantep
- Dolichiste
- Domuztepe
- Dorylaeum
- Drusipara
- Edessa, Mesopotamia
- Eflatun Pınar
- Ephesus
- Elaiussa Sebaste
- Emirdağ
- Epiphania, Cilicia
- Erythrae
- Euchaita
- Eumeneia
- Euromus
- Faustinopolis
- Gagae
- Gambrion
- Gangra
- Germanicia Caesarea
- Germanicopolis (Bithynia)
- Göbekli Tepe
- Gözlükule
- Gordium
- Gümüşler Monastery
- Gryneion
- Hacılar Höyük
- Halicarnassus
- Hamaxitus
- Harran
- Hasankeyf
- Hattusa
- Herakleia Salbace
- Hierapolis
- Hirbemerdon Tepe
- House of the Virgin Mary
- Hoşap Castle
- Hüseyindede Tepe
- Iasos
- Idyma
- Ibora
- Irenopolis
- Isinda
- Ivriz
- Hattusa
- Heraclea Cybistra
- Kadirli
- Kaman-Kalehöyük
- Karahan Tepe
- Karaman
- Karatepe
- Kaunos
- Kayaköy
- Kelenderis
- Kemalpaşa
- Kerkenes
- Kestel
- Kibyra (Cibyra)
- Kizzuwatna
- Klazomenai
- Knidos
- Koloneia in Cappadocia
- Korydalla
- Kussara
- Kültepe
- Kuşaklı
- Kuştul Monastery
- Labraunda
- Lagina
- Laodicea Combusta
- Laodicea on the Lycus
- Lebedus
- Letoon
- Libyssa
- Limantepe
- Limyra
- Loryma
- Lystra
- Lysimachia (Thrace)
- Magnesia on the Maeander
- Mallus
- Mamure Castle
- Metropolis (Anatolia)
- Miletus
- Mokissos
- Mopsuestia
- Mount Chimaera
- Mount Nemrut
- Myndus
- Myra
- Myriandus
- Myus
- Nagidos
- Nerik
- Nevali Cori
- Nicomedeia
- Nicopolis (Pontus)
- Notion (ancient city)
- Nysa (Caria)
- Nyssa (Cappadocia)
- Olba (ancient city)
- Olympos
- Oenoanda
- Orestias
- Panionium
- Patara
- Pednelissus, Pisidia
- Pepuza
- Perga
- Pergamon
- Perperene
- Pessinus
- Phaselis
- Phellus
- Phocaea
- Pinara
- Pınarbaşı Gölü
- Pitane (Aeolis)
- Podalia
- Pompeiopolis
- Priene
- Purushanda
- Rhodiopolis
- Rhosus
- Rusahinili
- Sagalassos
- Sakçagözü
- Salatiwara
- Salmydessos
- Sam'al
- Samosata
- Samuha
- Sapinuwa
- Sardis
- Sareisa
- Seleucia (Pamphylia)
- Seleucia Pieria
- Seleucia Sidera
- Selge, Pisidia
- Sesamos, Amestris
- Sestos
- Severan Bridge
- Side
- Sigeion
- Sillyon
- Simena
- Sidyma
- Skepsis
- Smyrna
- Soğmatar
- Soli, Cilicia
- Sozopolis, Pisidia
- St. Nicholas Island
- Stratonicea (Caria)
- Stratonicea (Lydia)
- Sugunia
- Sulusaray
- Sultantepe
- Sümela Monastery
- Syedra
- Tabae
- Tarsus, Mersin
- Tavium
- Tell Tayinat
- Telmessos
- Temnos
- Teos
- Termessos
- Thyatira
- Tille
- Tlos
- Toprakkale
- Tralleis
- Tripolis (Phrygia)
- Trocmades
- Troy Neolithic to Byzantine
- Trysa
- Tushhan
- Tushpa
- Tyana
- Tymbrianassus
- Tymion
- Great Mosque of Diyarbakır (Diyarbakır Ulu Camii)
- Van Fortress
- Xanthos
- Yazılıkaya
- Yenikapı
- Yeşilova Höyük
- Yumuktepe
- Zaliches
- Zelitis
- Zeugma
- Zincirli
- Andriake Synagogue

== Turkmenistan ==
- Altyndepe
- Anau-depe
- Berdysyčran-depe
- Gonur Tepe
- Jeitun
- Merv
- Monjukli Depe
- Namazga-Tepe
- Togolok
- Ulug Depe
- Yaz-depe

== Ukraine ==
- Aliobrix
- Apolyanka
- Berezan Island
- Bilche-Zolote
- Bilhorod Kyivskyi
- Bilsk hillfort
- Black Grave
- Boundary Stones
- Charax
- Chersonesus
- Chychyrkozivka
- Chyzhivka
- Deriivka
- Dobrovody
- Dykyi Sad
- Halych
- Harbuzyn
- Glubochek Hlybochok
- Grotto of Saint Onuphrius
- Kalos Limen
- Kamyana Mohyla
- Kimmerikon
- Khortytsia
- Khotiv hillfort
- Kocherzhyntsi
- Kosenivka
- Ksaverove
- Kul-Oba
- Kvitky
- Maidanetske
- Mamai-Hora
- Melgunov Kurgan
- Melitopol Kurgan
- Merheleva Ridge
- Mezhyrich
- Mezine
- Mogylna, Mohylna
- Myriv
- Myrmekion
- Myropillya, Myropillia
- Nebelivka
- Nikonion
- Nymphaion
- Olbia
- Olkhovets
- Onopryivka
- Pantikapaion
- Peregonivka, Perehonivka
- Pianeshkove
- Plisnesk
- Royal Kurgan
- Rozsokhuvatka
- Scythian Neapolis
- Serpent's Wall
- Shushkovka
- Shypyntsi
- Solokha Kurgan
- Stepanivka
- Stilsko
- Stina, Ukraine
- Sushkivka
- Talianky
- Tomashovka
- Tovsta Mohyla
- Trajan's Wall
- Trypillia
- Tyras
- Tyritake
- Valiava
- Vasylkove
- Verkhnii Saltiv
- Verteba Cave
- Vesioly Kut
- Vilkhovets (archaeological site)
- Vladyslavchyk
- Volodymyrivka (excavation site)
- Vyr
- Yaltushkiv
- Zvenyhorod

== United Arab Emirates ==
- Al-Ashoosh
- Al Madam
- Al Sufouh
- Bidaa bint Saud
- Bithnah
- Ed-Dur
- Hili
- Jebel Buhais
- Jebel Faya
- Jebel Hafeet
- Jumayra
- Kalba
- Masafi
- Mleiha
- Muweilah
- Qattara Oasis
- Rumailah
- Saruq Al Hadid
- Seih Al Harf
- Shimal
- Tell Abraq
- Thuqeibah
- Umm Al-Nar

== United Kingdom ==
- Arras
- Avebury
- Bignor
- Burton Fleming
- Caerleon
- Callanish
- Calleva Atrebatum
- Castell Henllys
- Chedworth Roman Villa
- Chew Stoke
- Chysauster Ancient Village
- Cladh Hallan
- Dan y Coed
- Danebury
- Danes Graves
- Duggleby Howe
- Eildon Hill
- Emain Macha
- Fishbourne
- Flag Fen
- Fountains Abbey
- Gough's Cave
- Grimes Graves
- Hadrian's Wall
- Hen Domen
- Herscha Hill
- Inchmarnock
- Ironbridge
- Jorvik Viking Centre
- Kirkstall Abbey
- Little Woodbury
- Lullingstone
- Maeshowe
- Maiden Castle, Dorset
- Mine Howe
- Mother Grundy's Parlour
- Nempnett Thrubwell
- Newbridge chariot, Edinburgh
- Normanton Down
- Paviland Cave
- Perceton, North Ayrshire, Medieval Manor
- Pixie's Hole
- Quanterness
- Ring of Brodgar
- Seahenge
- Silbury Hill
- Silchester
- Skara Brae
- Stanton Drew
- Star Carr
- Stonehenge
- Sutton Hoo
- Trelech
- Trimontium
- Ulva
- Verreville Glass and Pottery Works, Glasgow
- Verulamium
- Vindolanda
- Wetwang Slack
- Windmill Hill
- Woodhenge
- Wroxeter
- Yeavering
- York

== United States ==
See also: Archaeological sites in the United States by state or territory, List of Mississippian sites, List of Hopewell sites

- Accokeek Creek
- Angel Mounds
- Aztalan
- Barton Gulch
- Brunswick Town Historic District
- Blackwater Draw
- Blood Run Site
- Blythe Intaglios
- Bottle Creek Indian Mounds
- Burton Mound
- Caddo Mounds
- Cahawba
- Cahokia
- Calico Early Man Site
- Casa Grande
- Castle Hill in Sitka, Alaska
- Center for American Archeology, Koster Site
- Chaco Canyon
- Chucalissa, in Memphis, TN
- Clary Ranch
- Crystal River in Crystal River, Florida
- Effigy Mounds National Monument
- El Cuartelejo
- Etowah Mounds
- Etzanoa
- Ganondagan State Historic Site
- Gault site
- Grand Village of the Illinois
- Grand Village of the Natchez
- Grave Creek Mound
- Gungywamp in Groton, Connecticut
- Gunston Hall
- Mound City Group
- Hovenweep
- Jamestown, Virginia
- Jeffers Petroglyphs, Minnesota
- Kincaid Mounds State Historic Site
- Knife River Indian Villages
- LSU Campus Mounds
- Lubbock Lake Landmark
- Meadowcroft Rockshelter
- Mesa Verde
- Miami Circle
- Minong Mine Historic District
- Mitchell Site
- Mound Key
- Moundville
- Mountain Lake Site, Minnesota
- Newark Earthworks
- Nocoroco
- Ocmulgee Mounds
- Osage Village
- Ozette
- Parkin site
- Pecos Pueblo
- Plum Bayou Mounds
- Poverty Point
- Pueblo Grande Ruin and Irrigation Sites
- Pueblo Grande de Nevada
- Pumpkin Creek Site
- Sacred Ridge
- Serpent Mound
- Snaketown
- Slack Farm
- Spiro Mounds
- St. Mary's City, Maryland
- Tibes Indigenous Ceremonial Center, in Ponce, Puerto Rico
- Topper site in Allendale, South Carolina
- Town Creek Indian Mound
- Troyville Earthworks
- Watson Brake
- Wickliffe Mounds
- Windover site
- Williamsburg
- Whydah Gally, site of extensive underwater archaeology
- Winterville site

== Uzbekistan ==
- Bukhara
- Samarkand

== Yemen ==
- Ma'rib Capital of the Sabaean empire
- Zafar Capital of the Himyarite empire

== Zimbabwe ==
- Great Zimbabwe
- Ziwa
- Matopos

== See also ==
- Archaeology by country
- New7Wonders of the World
- List of Ancient Settlements in the UAE
- List of archaeoastronomical sites by country
- List of colossal sculpture in situ
- List of Egyptian pyramids
- List of largest domes
- List of megalithic sites
- List of Mesoamerican pyramids
- List of Roman domes
- List of tallest statues
- List of archaeological sites in Erbil Governorate
