= Kharligarh =

Site plan

Kharligarh, ruined settlement with defences, (20°27'37"N; 83°33'38"E), Dist. Balangir, Odisha. A key site for the early history of western Orissa is Kharligarh 1.5 km east of Bhuampada, near the confluence of the Rahul and the Tel. The antiquity of this naturally defensible site has been recognised since the 1930s. This 600 x 300m (14 ha intra muros) site lies in a meander of the Rahul the western open end of which is sealed off by a 10m high wall some 50m in width. The western fortification, including a ruined tower, is the most prominent feature of the site. It is one of the largest early historic sites known in Odisha.

In 2002 trenching carried out by the Sambalpur University yielded the ware typical of the area: Black and Red Ware, Plain Red Ware, Red Slip Ware, Black Ware, Black Slip Ware, Burnished Black Ware. These suggest a possible settlement as early as the 3rd - 2nd centuries BCE and an end terminus in the early medieval period.

== See also ==
- List of archaeological sites by country
- Paul A. Yule
