= Olkhovets =

Olkhovets is the site of an ancient mega-settlement dating to 2750 B.C. belonging to the Cucuteni-Trypillian culture, located in present-day Ukraine. The settlement was for the time very large, covering an area of 180 hectares. This proto-city are just one of 2440 Cucuteni-Trypillia settlements discovered so far in Moldova and Ukraine. 194 (8%) of these settlements had an area of more than 10 hectares between 5000 - 2700 B.C. and more than 29 settlements had an area in the range 100 - 300 - 450 Hectares.

== See also ==
- Danube civilization
