= Boundary Stones =

Archaeological site in Ukraine, from late Neolithic period

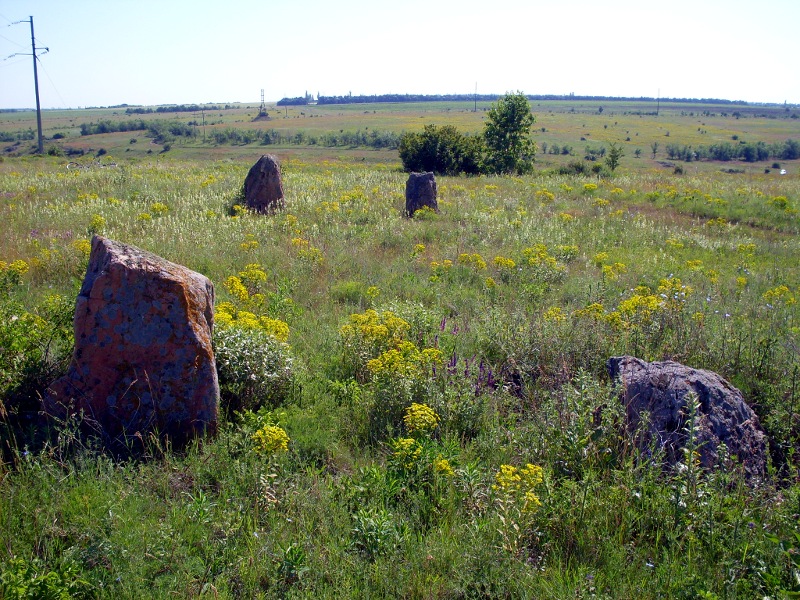

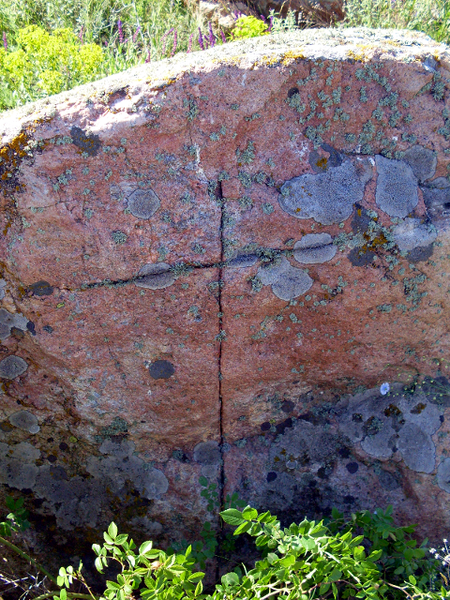

Boundary Stones is an archaeological site in Ukraine since the Late Neolithic located in Kropyvnytskyi Raion of Kirovohrad Oblast. Consists of two series of 15 pairs of parallel stone monoliths - alley menhirs. Perhaps this religious building associated with the god of the Sun. Rows are oriented from east to west, the height of the parallel pairs of identical blocks. The highest second pair (1.50 m), height should be gradually reduced. The distance between adjacent rows of blocks increases. Qualified archaeological research of the monument was carried out.

Within a radius of 1-2 km from the Boundary Stones is located about 20 barrows (Neolithic, Bronze) and many of them destroyed. In the immediate vicinity - Grotto (shelter) "Devil's Cave."

== External links and sources ==
- Legend about how the devil wanted to share the earth.(in Ukrainian)
- Boundary stones on Geocaching (in Russian)
- Boundary stones photo
