= Prasat Phum Prasat =

Hindu Temple in Cambodia

Prasat Phum Prasat is a Hindu temple in Prasat, Santuk District, in Kampong Thom Province, Cambodia. It is located 27-km from the provincial capital of Kampong Thom. The site was a former royal palace which was used as a depositary were royal valuables were kept. During the French colonization of Cambodia the valuables were removed.

== Architecture ==
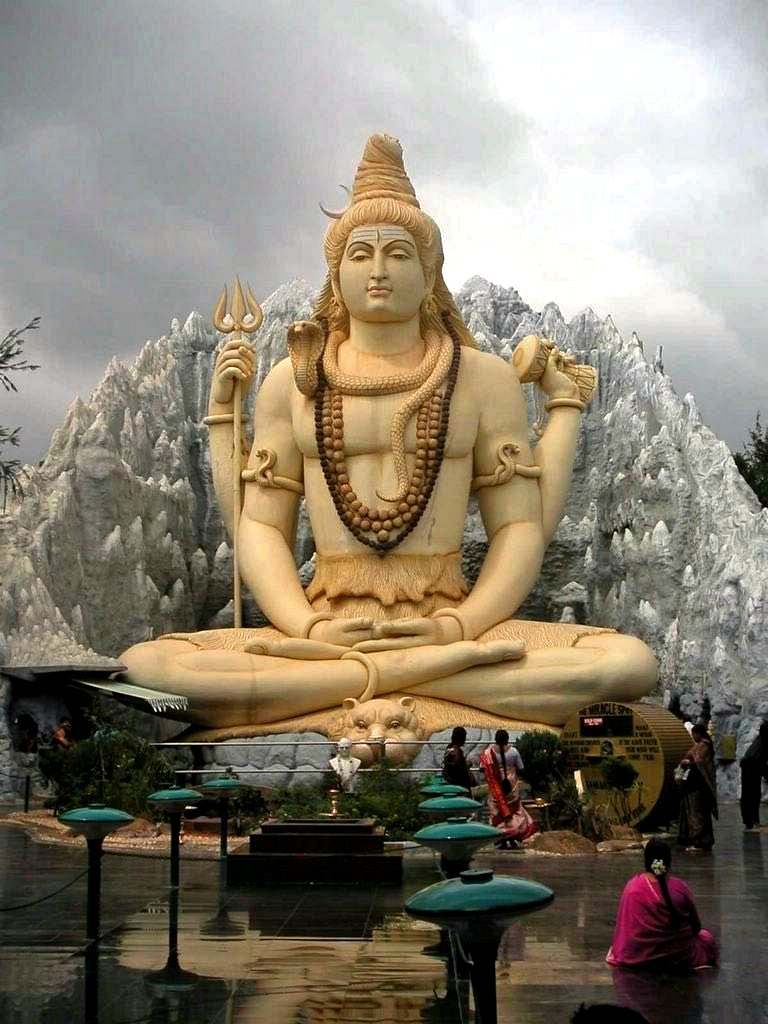
The temple was dedicated to Shiva

The complex consists of 4 ancient structures - 3 brick and 1 laterite and masonry and sandstone. They are situated in a north and south manner.

The temple was built in the 8th century possibly in the year 706 and is dedicated to Shiva. In the upper corner the temple contained the segments of Linga and Yoni. The Somasutra, a funnel which transports holy water from the statue in the main chamber, can still be found in the main edifice.

In the Early Middle Ages the wooden door displayed sculptures of male and female deities. The door facing south was inscribed with five lines of Khmer text.

A hill named Toul Samrong or Toul Nak Ta Samrong was situated south of the main temple. To east of this hill, there was a Pou tree in which the local Khmer people call Toul Nak Ta Deum Pou. This translates in English as "The Hill of the Body Tree Spirit".

Buried into the ground near the Prasat Phum Prasat, there was an inscription containing six lines of Sanskrit scripts.
