= Casa de la Cacica =

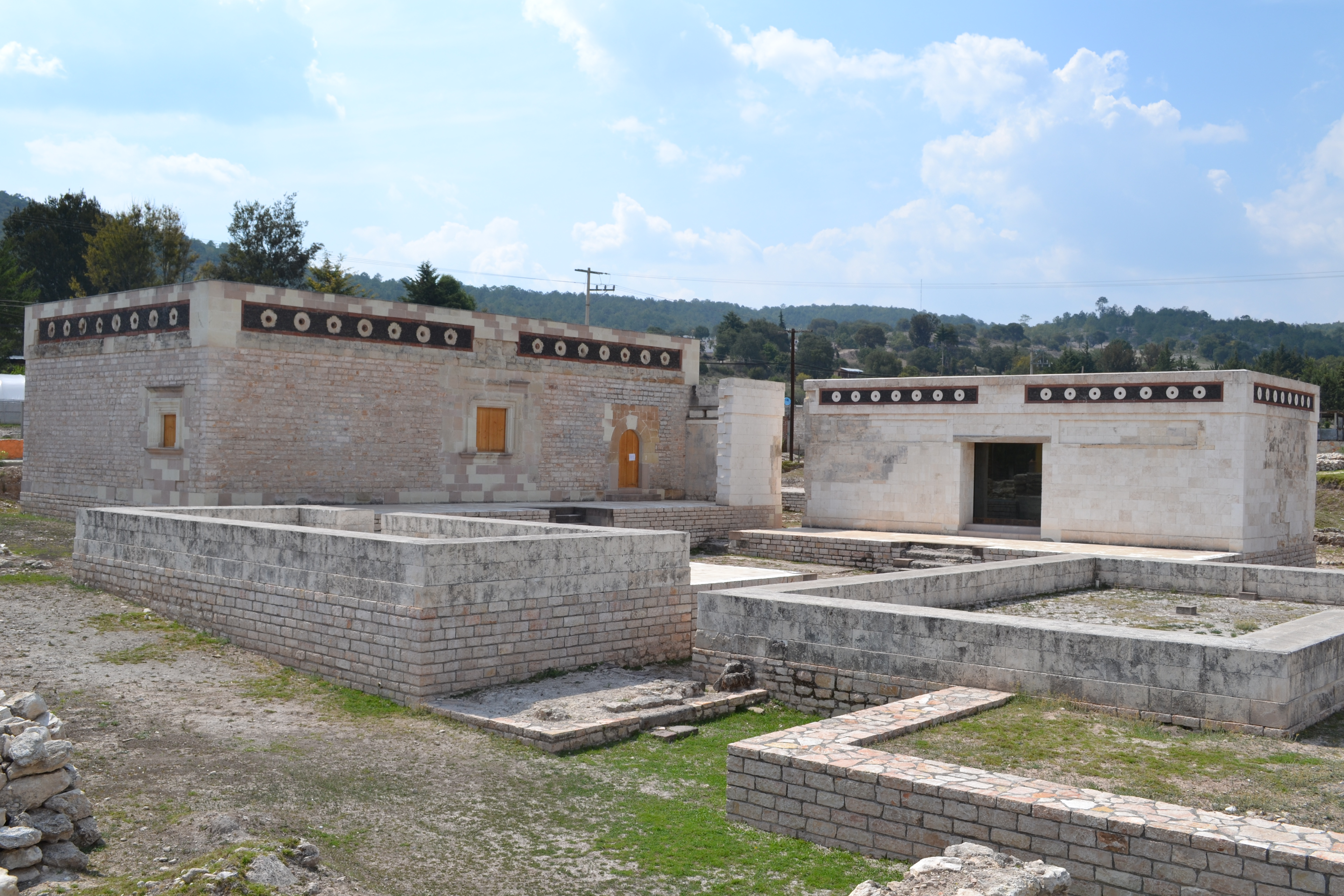

General information
- Location: Teposcolula, Oaxaca, Mexico

The Casa de la Cacica is a 16th-century Mixtec building complex in Teposcolula, Oaxaca, Mexico.

Its current name, meaning "house of the cacica" in Spanish, may refer to Doña Catalina de Peralta who took possession of the home in 1569.
