= Tell Kashkashok =

Archaeological site in the Khabur River Valley, north Syria

- أخبر كاشكاشوك (Arabic)
- Tell Kashkashuk
- Location within Syria Location within Near East
- 36°38′20″N 40°38′21″E
- Type: archaeological site, cluster
- Periods: Halaf culture (Kashkashok I)
- Location: Hasakah Governorate, Syria
- Region: Upper Mesopotamia

Site notes
- Height: 2 metre (Kashkashok I), 20 metre (Kashkashok III)
- Length: 250 metre (Kashkashok III)
- Width: 220 metre (Kashkashok III)
- Diameter: 50 metre (Kashkashok I)
- Excavation dates: 1986–1991; 1987–1990
- Archaeologists: Antoine Suleiman (Kashkashok III, Kashkashok I)

Tell Kashashok (أخبر كاشكاشوك) is an archaeological site in the Khabur River Valley, of Northern Syria. The site is dated by pottery finds to the latter neolithic era, and early Dynastic era. The site was excavated by the Directorate General of Antiquities of Syria in 1987 and 1988. The Early Dynastic era includes a destruction layer, and an early adoption of cuneiform. It may have been known in antiquity as Kiš. A few clay numerical tablets from the EB III were found.
