= Pixie's Hole =

Cave in Devon, England

- Pixie's Cave
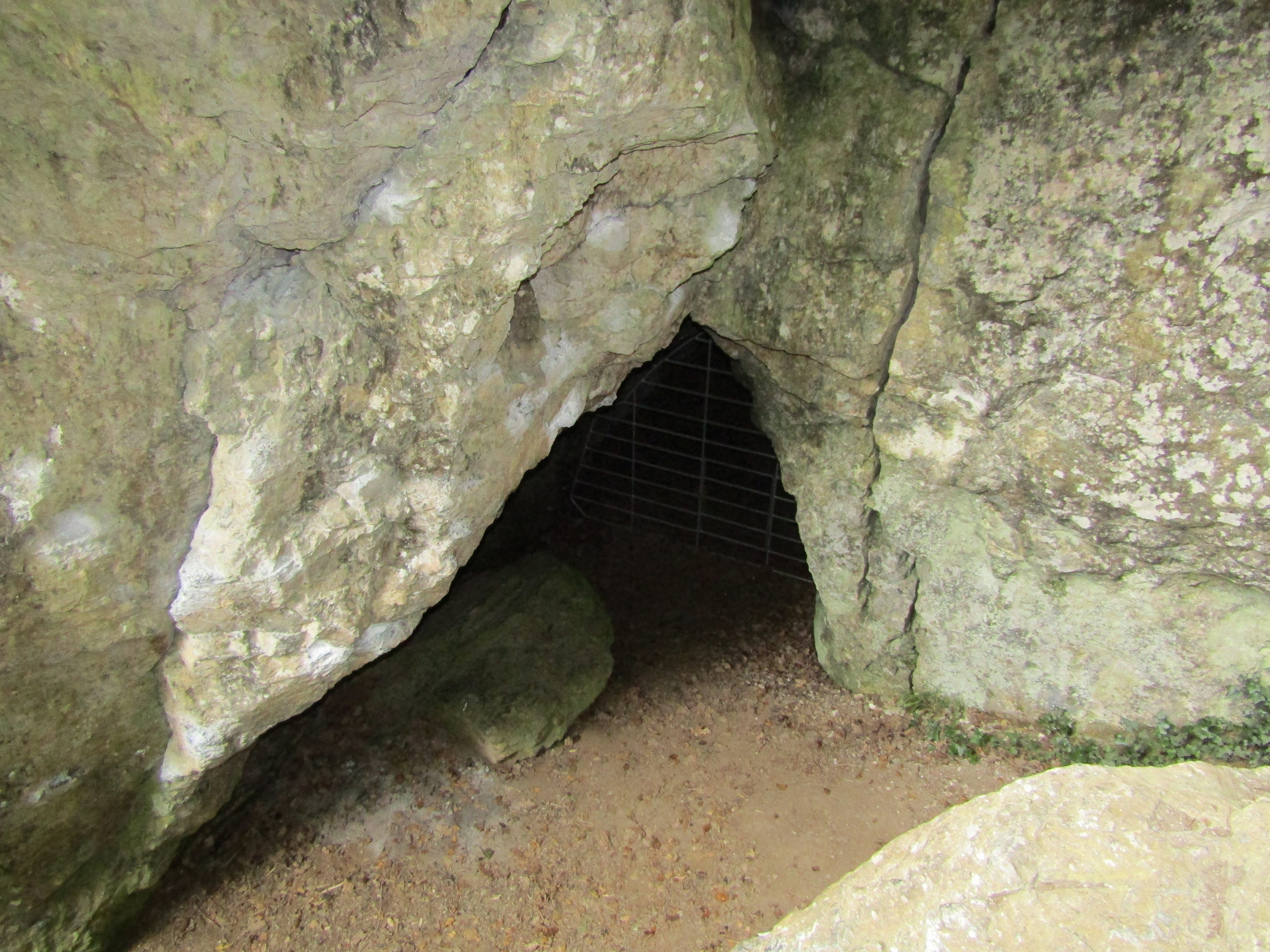
- The cave entrance

- Location within Devon
- Location: Chudleigh Rock, Devon, England
- OS grid: SX 86540 78665
- Coordinates: 50.596682°N 3.604510°W
- Entrances: 1
- Access: Gated

Pixie's Hole is a limestone cave system which is situated on the south side of the Chudleigh Rock, close to the village of Chudleigh, Devon, England. It is listed as a Scheduled Monument by Historic England and was first listed in 1992.

== Description ==
Pixie's Hole is situated on the north side of the Kate Brook Valley at the limestone outcrop known as Chudleigh Rock. From the entrance of the cave, the eastern passage extends towards the "Pope's Chamber" over a distance of about 30 metres.

== Excavations ==
Investigations of the cave were undertaken in the 19th century but proved inconclusive. In 1825, the geologist and paleontologist William Buckland visited Pixies Hole, among several other caves.

New excavations were conducted in the late 1970s inside the cave about 10m from the entrance. These revealed a rich concentration of Late Upper Palaeolithic artefacts and animal bones beneath a stalagmite floor.
