= Cocev Kamen =

Cave complex and archaeological site in North Macedonia

- Цоцев Камен (Macedonian)
- Tsote’s Stone
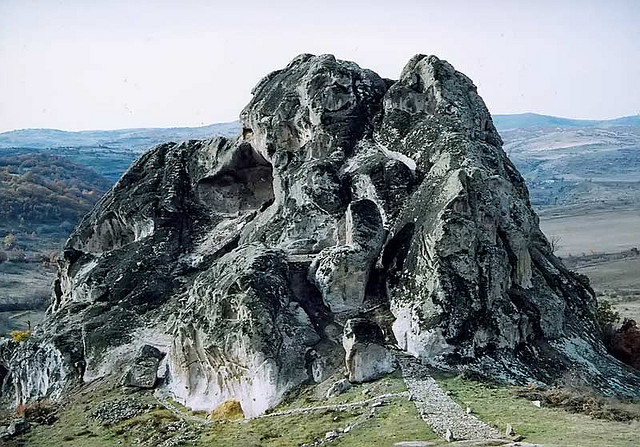
- Approach to the site

- Location in North Macedonia
- 42°05′24″N 21°59′22″E
- Type: cave, rock shelter
- Location: Kratovo Municipality, North Macedonia
- Region: Northeastern Statistical Region

Site notes
- Material: Igneous rock
- Height: 481 m (1,578 ft)
- Condition: 3

Cocev Kamen (Macedonian: Цоцев Камен) is a hilltop cave site of volcanic origin near the town of Kratovo in the north-east of North Macedonia. Objects (bone fossils) discovered near the cave suggest human presence since the Paleolithic. Authors agree that the site served as a gathering point for sacrificial rituals from the Neolithic, during the Bronze Age, throughout antiquity until the Middle Ages as clarified by an abundance of pottery shards, stone (flint) tools and bone fragments unearthed from the surrounding areas. Several caves and rock shelters are decorated with red figurative art work. Comparison with similar sites in Bulgaria and Italy suggests that the paintings are indeed prehistoric.

Debated remains the notion that Cocev Kamen has also been used as an (astronomical) observatory. "There are visible interventions on the stone surface everywhere, in the form of stairs, pools, thrones, and one big cave was completely rearranged, with a large part of its wall ripped off to make a fenced platform looking at the nearby hill, which contains big natural stones..." These alterations served ceremonial purposes during offerings to fertility deities.
