= Irenopolis =

Irenopolis or Eirenopolis or Eirenoupolis (Greek: Ειρηνούπολις, "city of peace") may refer to several places:

- Beroea (Thrace), in Thrace
- Irenopolis (Cilicia), also a Roman Catholic titular bishopric
- Irenopolis (Isauria), also a Roman Catholic titular bishopric
- Stara Zagora, in the Balkans
- A nickname for Middlesbrough, North Yorkshire, England

== See also ==
- Eirinoupoli, Imathia, Central Macedonia, Greece
- Ironopolia, a genus of moths
