= El Chorro de Maita =

Archaeological site in Cuba

Coordinates: 21°5′4.5024″N 75°48′56.6028″W

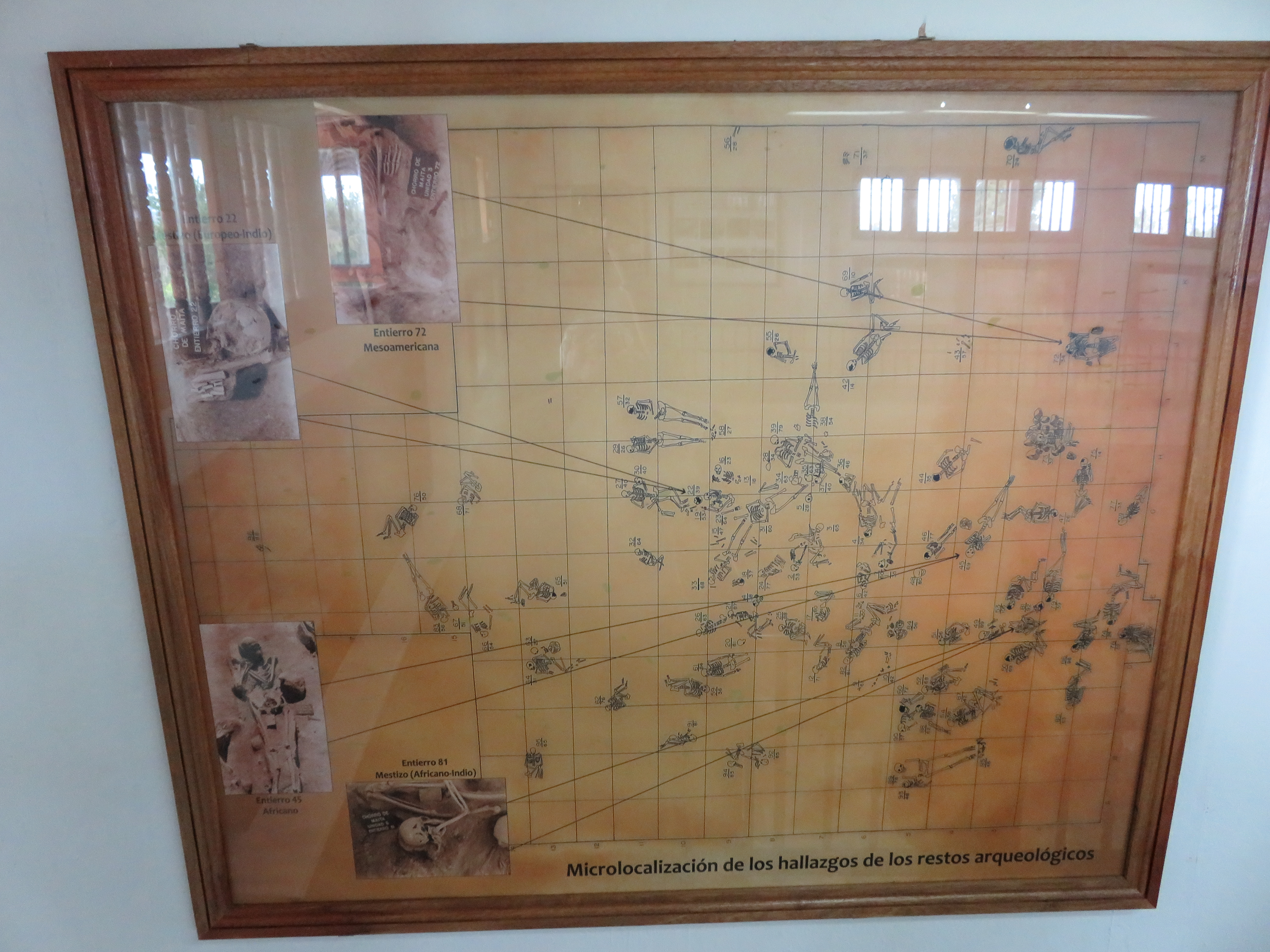
Diagram of El Chorro de Maita Burial Site

El Chorro de Maíta is an archaeological site near Guardalavaca in Eastern Cuba spanning the late prehistoric through early colonial periods, from around 1300 to around 1550 AD.

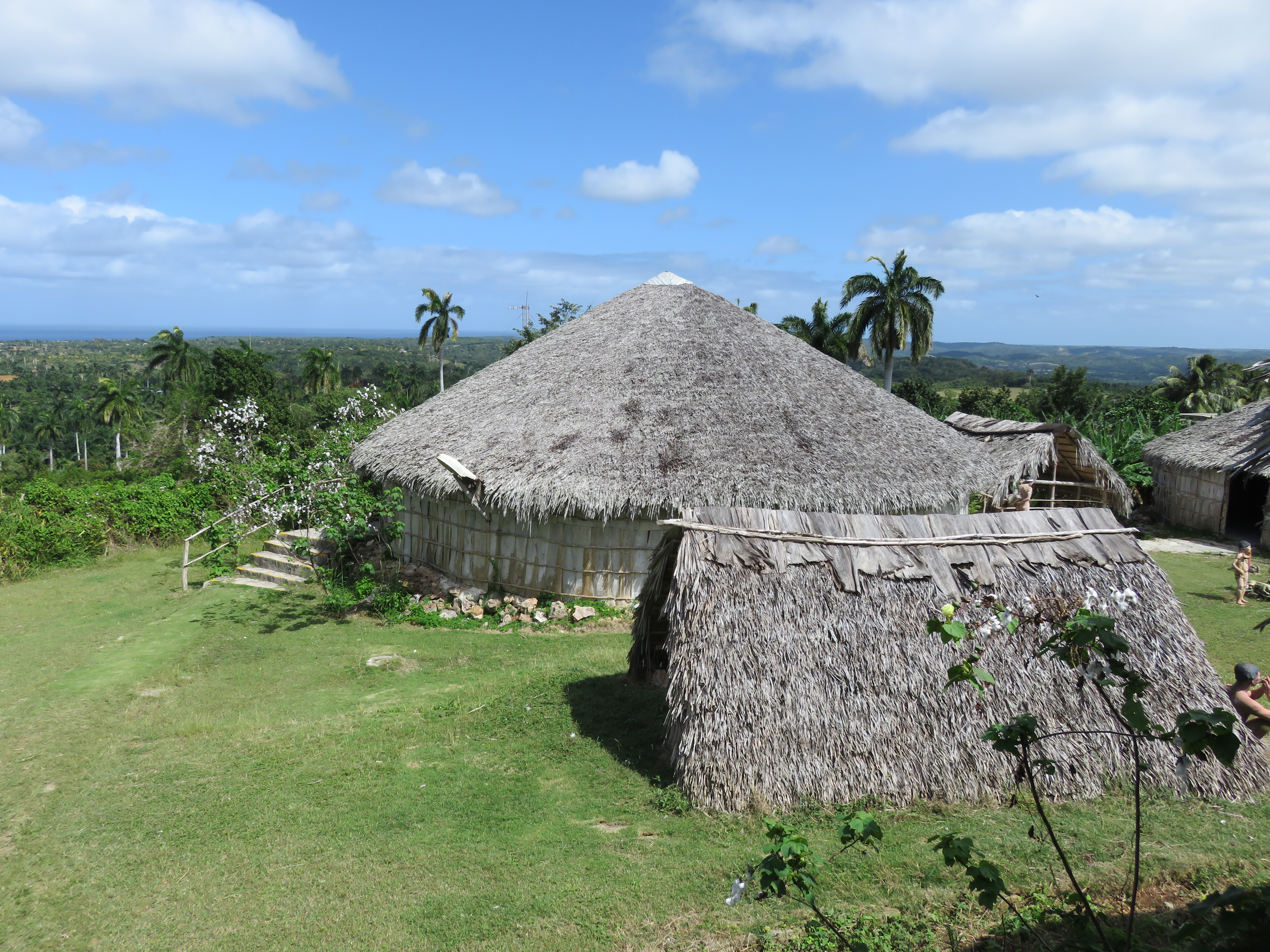
Reconstructed Dwellings at El Chorro de Maita

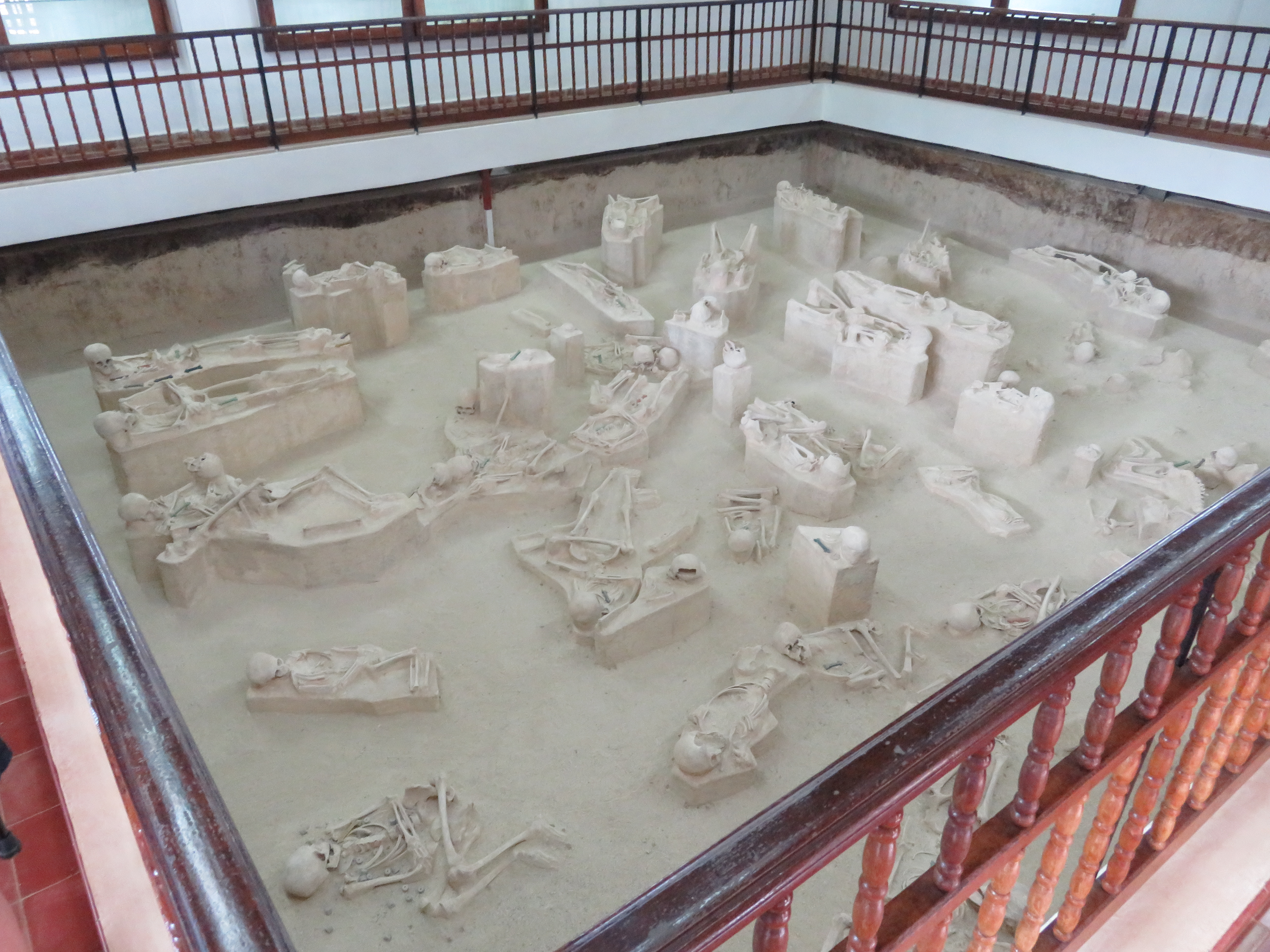
Archeological display of original burial site

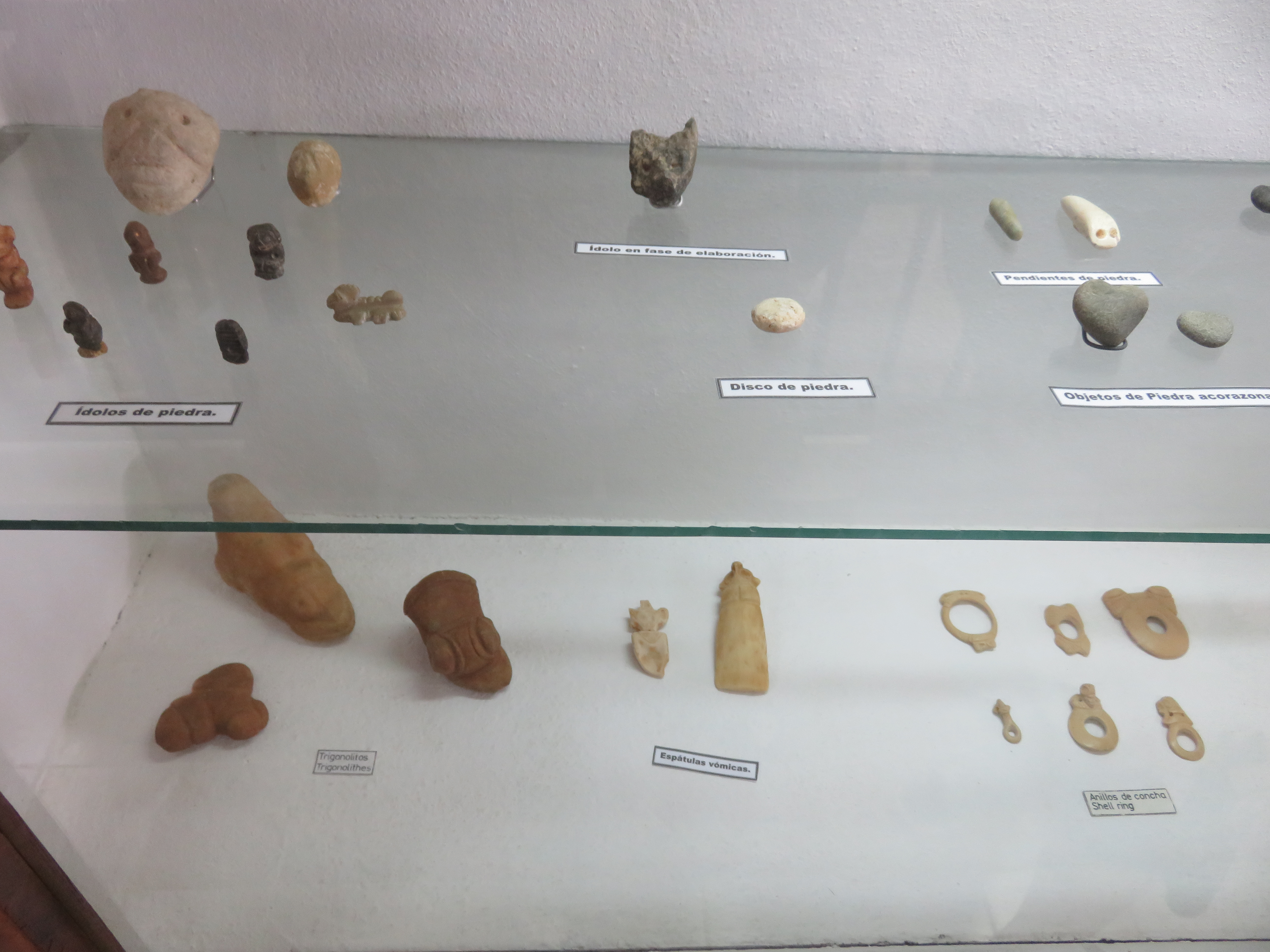
Idols and other objects from the site

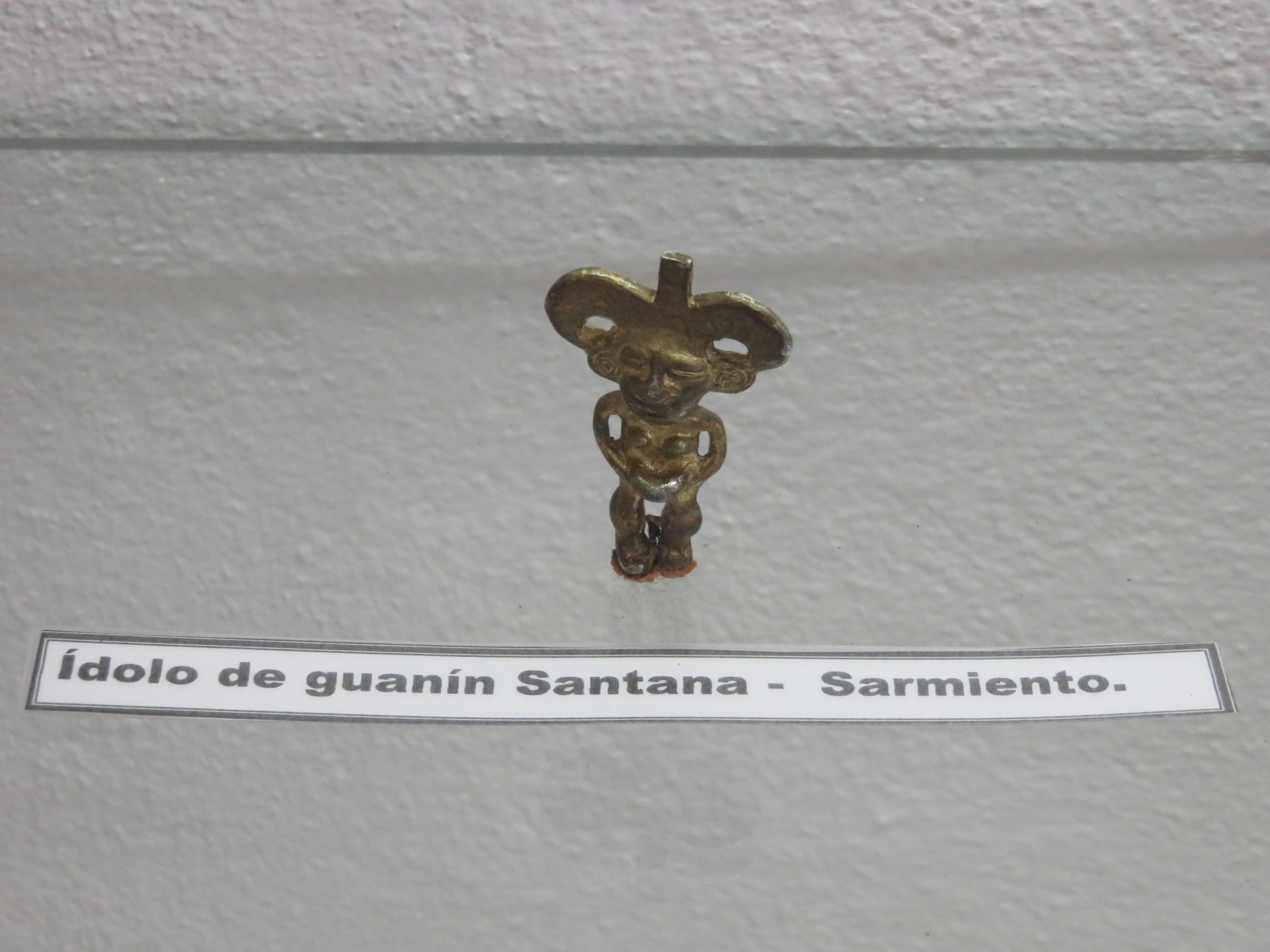
Metal Taino Idol in Museum of El Chorro de Maita Cuba

The site dates from the early 16th century and consists of an excavated Indigenous settlement and cemetery, including dozens of well-preserved human remains. Recent scholarship suggests that Indigenous peoples were living here many decades after Christopher Columbus' arrival. Across from the site is a restaurant and a reconstructed Indigenous village that features life-sized models of native dwellings.
