= Veluška Tumba =

Archaeological site near Bitola, North Macedonia

Coordinates: 40.916667°N 21.35°E

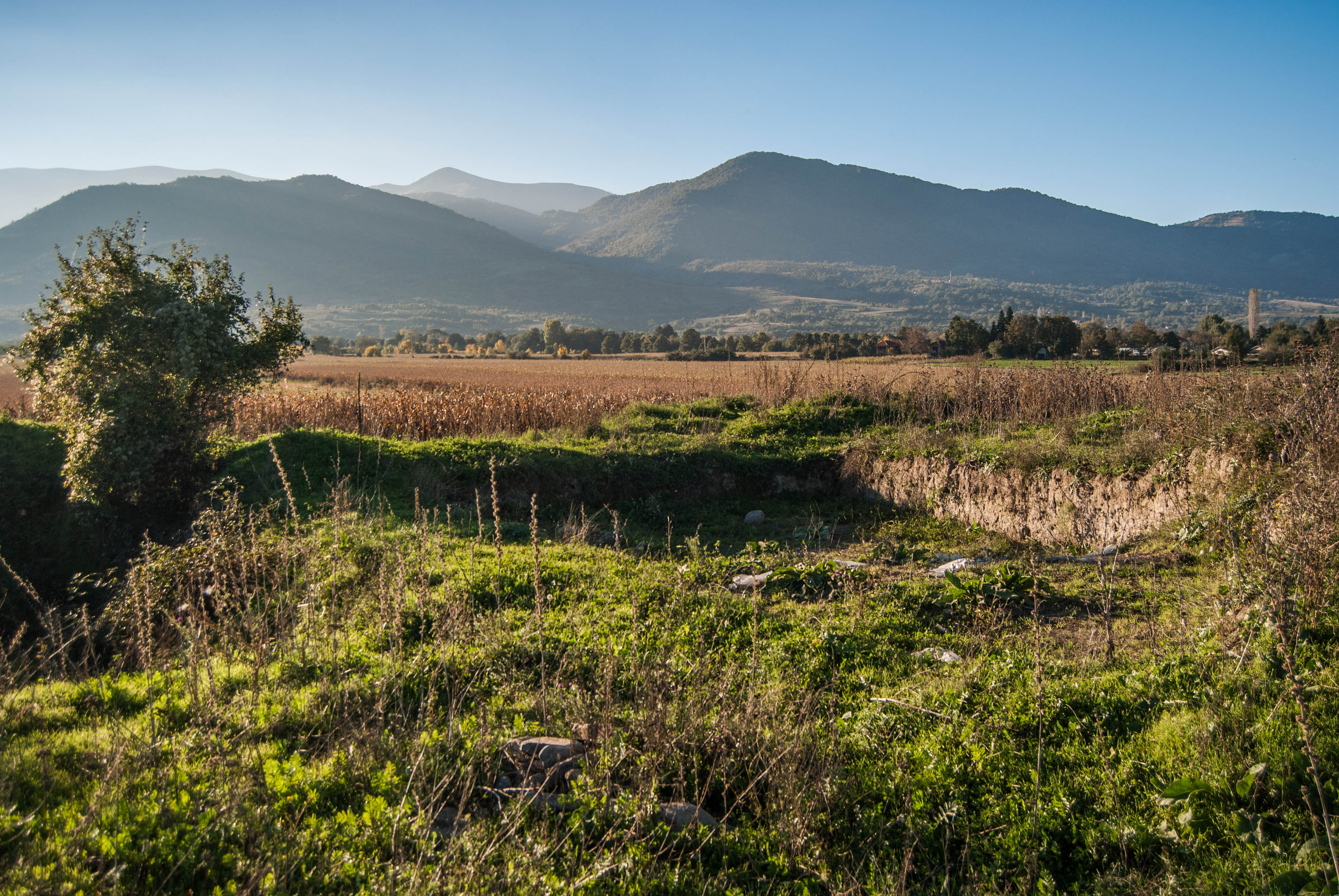
Veluška Tumba

Veluška Tumba (Macedonian: Велушка Тумба) is an ancient living area from Neolithic times. It is near the village of Porodin, Republic of Macedonia, close to Bitola. Veluška Tumba was discovered in 1978. Pottery and many tools were found here and are now housed in the Museum of Bitola.
