= Vasylkove =

Ancient mega-settlement in Ukraine

Vasylkove, in Ukraine, is the site of an ancient mega-settlement dating to 3600 - 3200 B.C. belonging to the Cucuteni-Trypillian culture. The settlement was for the time very large, covering an area of 100 hectares (250 acres). This proto-city is just one of 2440 Cucuteni-Trypillia settlements discovered so far in Moldova and Ukraine. 194 (8%) of these settlements had an area of more than 10 hectares (25 acres) between 5000 - 2700 B.C. and more than 29 settlements had an area in the range 100 - 300 - 450 hectares.

== See also ==
- Danube civilization
