= Al-Moyassar =

Archaeological site in Oman

Coordinates: 22°47′47″N 58°7′45″E

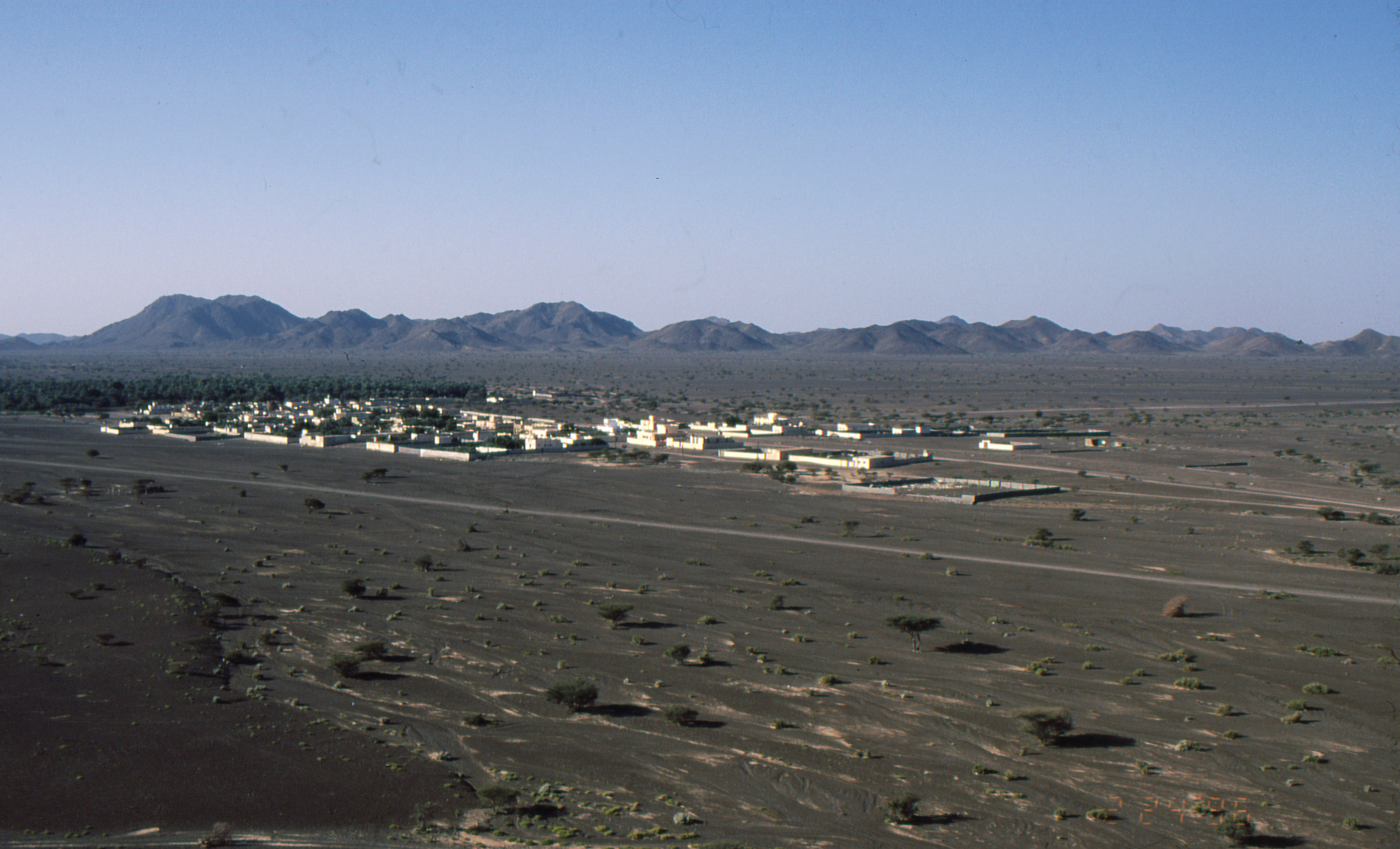
Village of al-Moyassar viewed to the south-west in 1996.

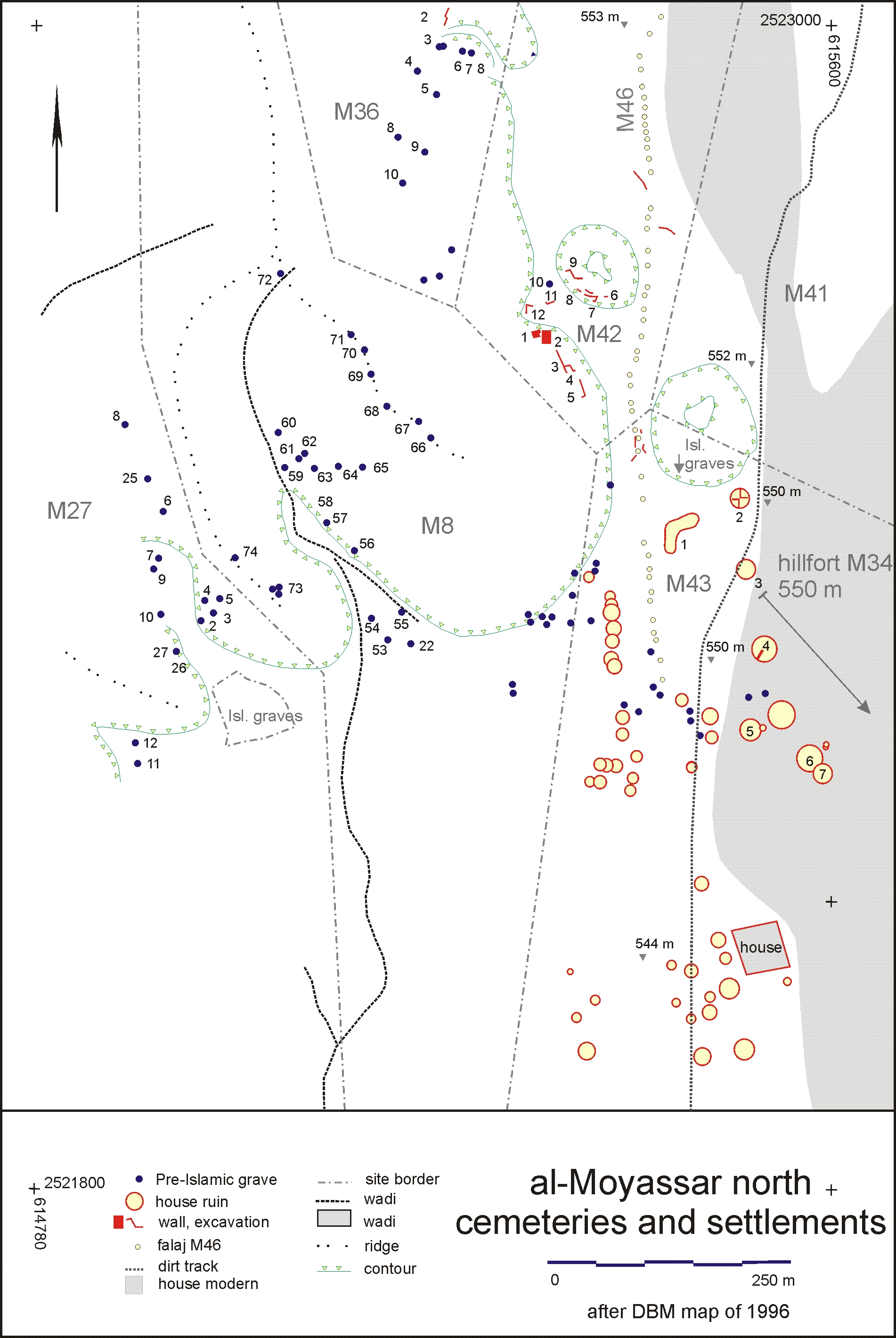
Plan of the archaeological zone Moyassar north, which lies to the north of the present-day village.

al-Moyassar (till c. 1995 al-Maysar) (22°47'N; 58°07'E, 545 m altitude) is an archaeological zone in the Sharqiyah province, Oman where the remains of all pre-Islamic periods came to light. The geographic definition has changed in recent years for this irregular area which measures some 2 × 5 km. It lies directly west of the Samad oasis.

During the course of explorations in 1973, archaeological sites came to light to the team of J.H. Humphries and R.H. Meadow. In 1976 the British D. B. Doe & B. de Cardi conducted more extensive surveyed and returned to the area. Given its large size, a more intensive effort was deemed necessary to reveal its information. Beginning in 1977 to 1981 Gerd Weisgerber of the German Mining Museum in Bochum undertook extensive survey and excavation in al-Maysar and Samad in search of the copper producing land of Magan/Makkan (respectively Sumerian and Akkadian). The team researched sites of various period, most notably "al-Maysar" M1 (Umm an-Nar period metal production settlement), Lizq L1 (Early Iron Age mountain fort), M42 (Early Iron Age settlement), M34 (Late Iron Age fort) and M9 (Late Iron Age cemetery), and the nearby al-Akhdhar cemetery. The falaj which runs north–south provides a historic line with which we can follow from the Early Iron Age through the Late Iron Age into the recent period.

Around 1995, by royal decree the town name was changed from al-Maysar to al-Moyassar, owing to a resemblance to the maysir game, which the Prophet disapproved of.

== See also ==
- Archaeology of Oman
- List of archaeological sites by country

== Sources ==
- Manfred Kunter, Bronze- und eisenzeitliche Skelettfunde, in: Weisgerber et al. 1981, 247–249.
- Gerd Weisgerber, ...und Kupfer in Oman, Anschnitt 32,2-3, 62–110.
- Gerd Weisgerber, Aspects of Late Iron Age Archaeology in Oman: The Samad Civilizations, Proc. Sem. Arab. Stud. 12, 81–93.
- Gerd Weisgerber et al., Mehr als Kupfer in Oman, Anschnitt 33,5-6, 1981, 174–263.
- Paul Yule, Cross-roads – Early and Late Iron Age South-eastern Arabia, Abhandlungen Deutsche Orient-Gesellschaft, vol. 30, Wiesbaden 2014 ISBN 978-3-447-10127-1
