= ʿUmq al-Rabaḫ =

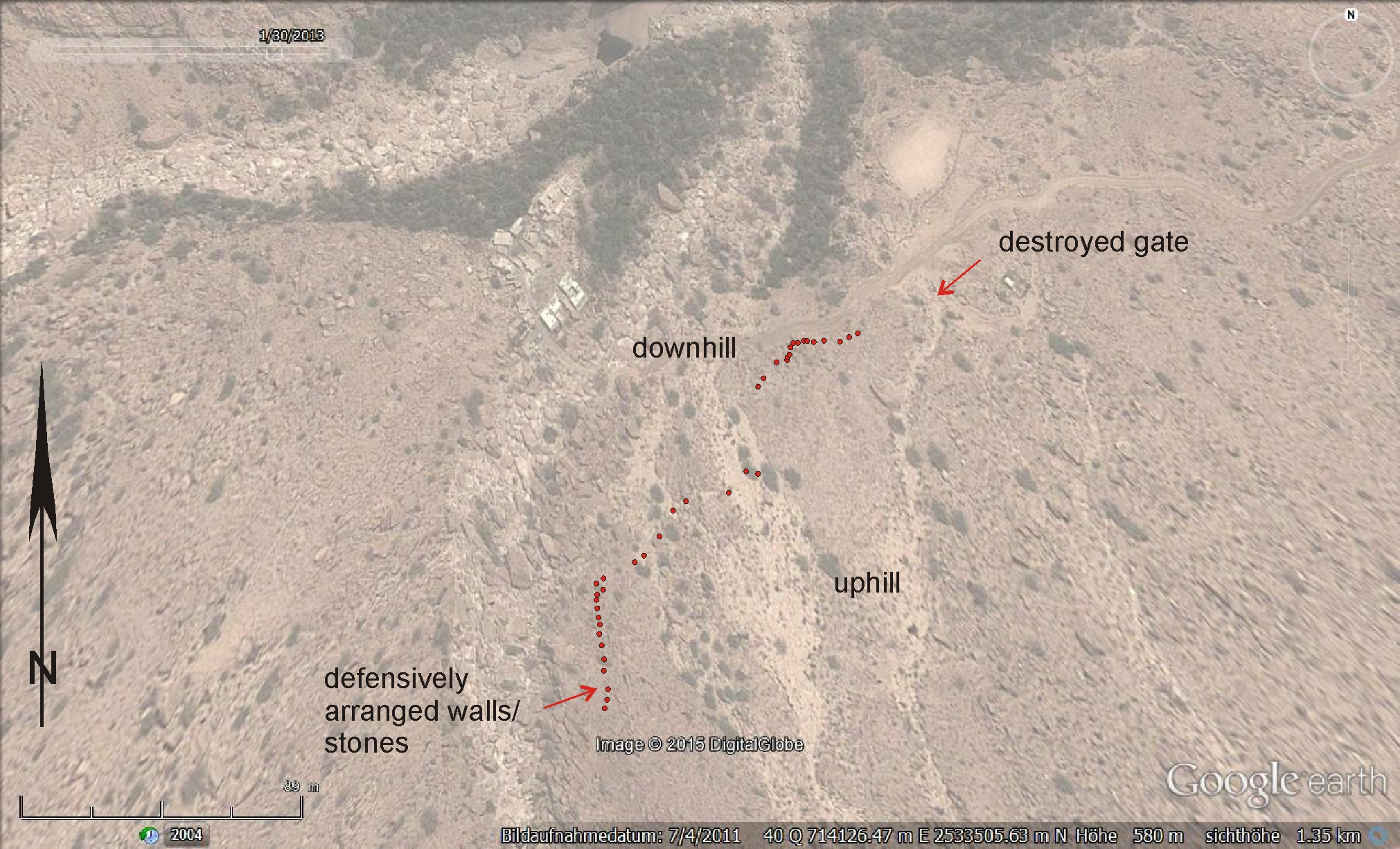
Google Earth photo which shows Late Iron Age fortification ruins.

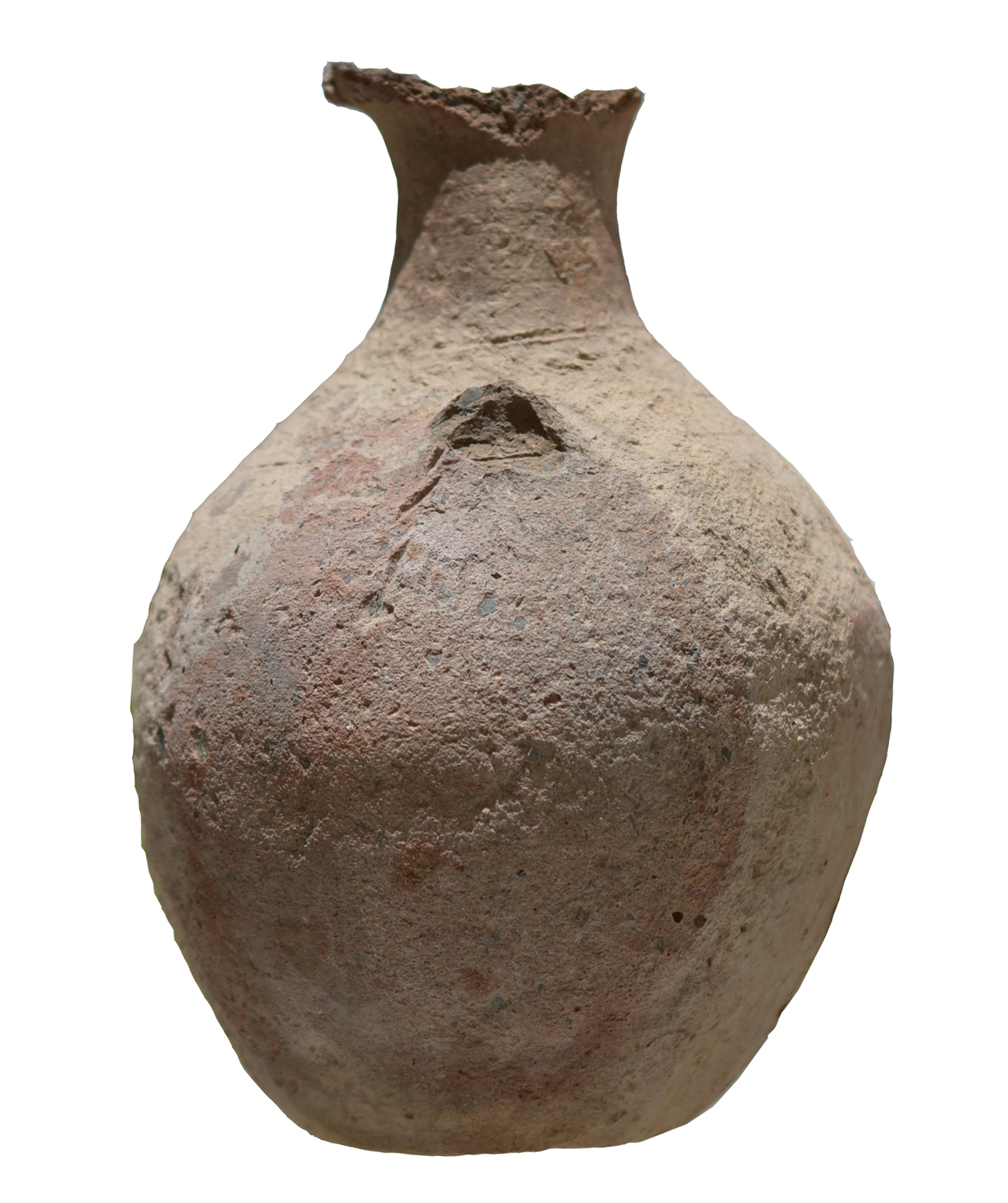
Small bottle (Samad Late Iron Age assemblage), Umq al-Rabah, al-Sharqiyah Province of Oman, surface find, in the Ministry of Heritage and Culture, Muscat.

Umq al-Rabach (or ʿUmq al-Rabaḫ), al-Sharqiyah, Sultanate of Oman is an archaeological site of the Samad Late Iron Age and Islamic Periods.

The team inspected three archaeological sites (1‒3): two cemeteries and a settlement.

Site 1. UTM 40Q, 714060 m E, 2533396 m N, altitude 533 m. The largest and most interesting was the settlement called al-Dar which lies on a steep slope. The site is extremely isolated from the sea and neighbouring villages. One does not expect here intensive stone-robbing. No evidence of stone robbing (“white spaces”) between oxidised stones.

The site consists of a distribution of scattered house ruins, is simple. Downhill to the north-west there is loose row of mostly natural defences, not continuous building. In one spot there is no trace Houses exist despite the lack of a town wall. Houses most dense in the centre of the site. To the south, the cliff above is over 100 m high. From NNE to SSW had to be protected. Main fortification at the NE end. One building sited with niche to the SW side is not a mosque. On W side the fortifications are natural. Between them there are a few wall fragments. A fragmentary gate is visible 20 m south-east of the south-easternmost of the stones. At the north-east of the wall, there was an entrance. Beside it stands an antiquities sign. During a brief stay the team observed 10 Samad Late Iron Age sherds, one or two possible Early Iron Age sherds, but also Muslim period glazed sgraffiato sherds. A few years ago one of the villagers (Khamis Salim al-Rubkhi) submitted a whole Late Iron Age vessel from the site. Six sherds are lodged in the Ministry of Heritage and Culture store, mostly Samad Late Iron Age. The organisation of the houses and the fortifications differ dramatically from the big walls at the sites Jebel Sunsunah, Ibra I0052 or Tiwi TW0002.

Site 2. Inspected a cemetery in the village itself which consists of c. 90 graves. Perhaps as many as 10 date to the Samad Late Iron Age Period. Most graves show the qibla orientation, none the typical SE‒NW Samad Late Iron Age orientation.

Site 3. UTM 40Q, 713775 m E, 2533493 m N, altitude 530 m, waypoint 44 called Bedaʾya. A further cemetery consisted of many Islamic period graves. It was difficult to determine any earlier in date. One which is 6 m wide and circular can only be pre-Islamic. C. 150 Islamic graves with šawaḥīd stones.

== See also ==
- al-Amqat
- al-Bustan
- Archaeology of Oman
- Qaryat al-Saih
- Samad al-Shan
- ʿUqdat al-Bakrah
- al-Nejd, Sultanate of Oman
- Archaeology of Oman
