= Al-Akhdhar, Oman =

Al-Akhdhar
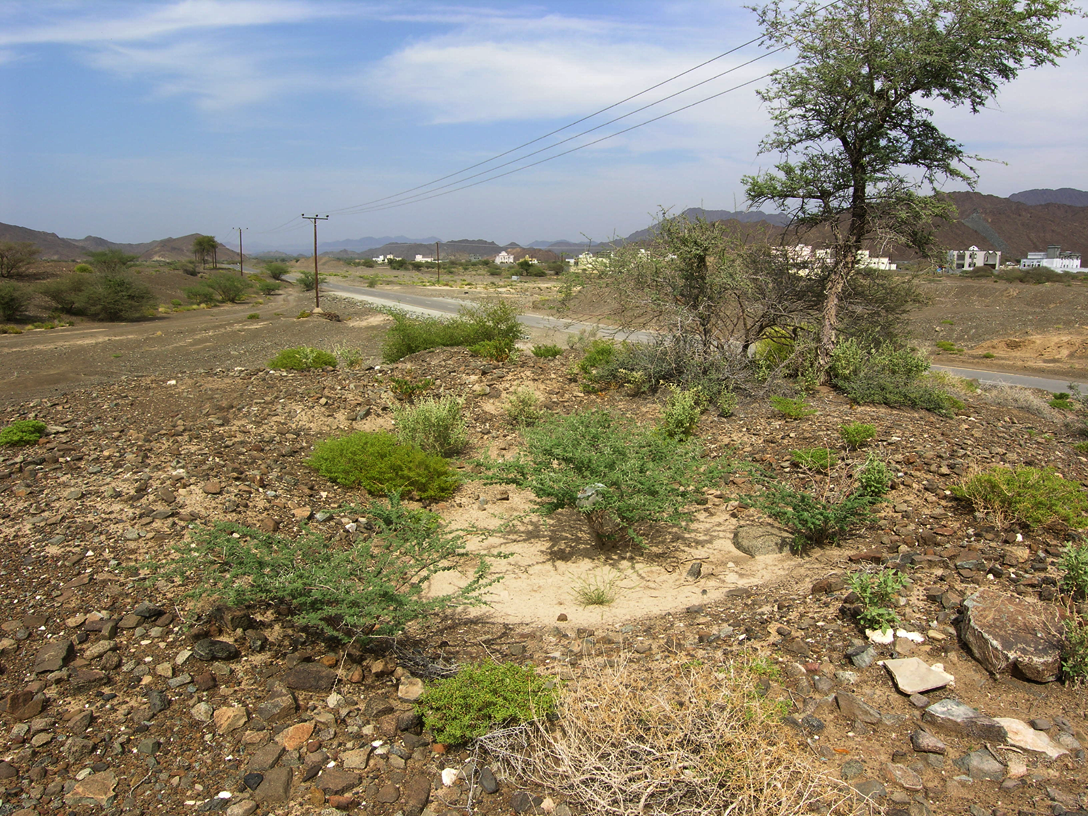
- The site in 1987

- Location of the site in Oman
- 22°50′38″N 58°10′39″E
- Periods: Bronze Age; Late Iron Age; Islamic
- Cultures: Umm an-Nar; Wadi Suq; Samad
- Location: Ash Sharqiyah, Oman

Site notes
- Elevation: 576 m (1,890 ft)
- Excavation dates: 1974 (undocumented); 1981 (German Mining Museum)
- Archaeologists: D. Brian Doe; Beatrice de Cardi; Gerd Weisgerber; B. Vogt; A. Tillman; Paul Alan Yule
- Discovered: 1973–1974

Al-Akhdhar is an archaeological site in Ash Sharqiyah, Oman. It is a cemetery containing remains dating from the Umm al-Nar, Wadi Suq, Late Iron Age (Samad), and Islamic periods.

== Description ==
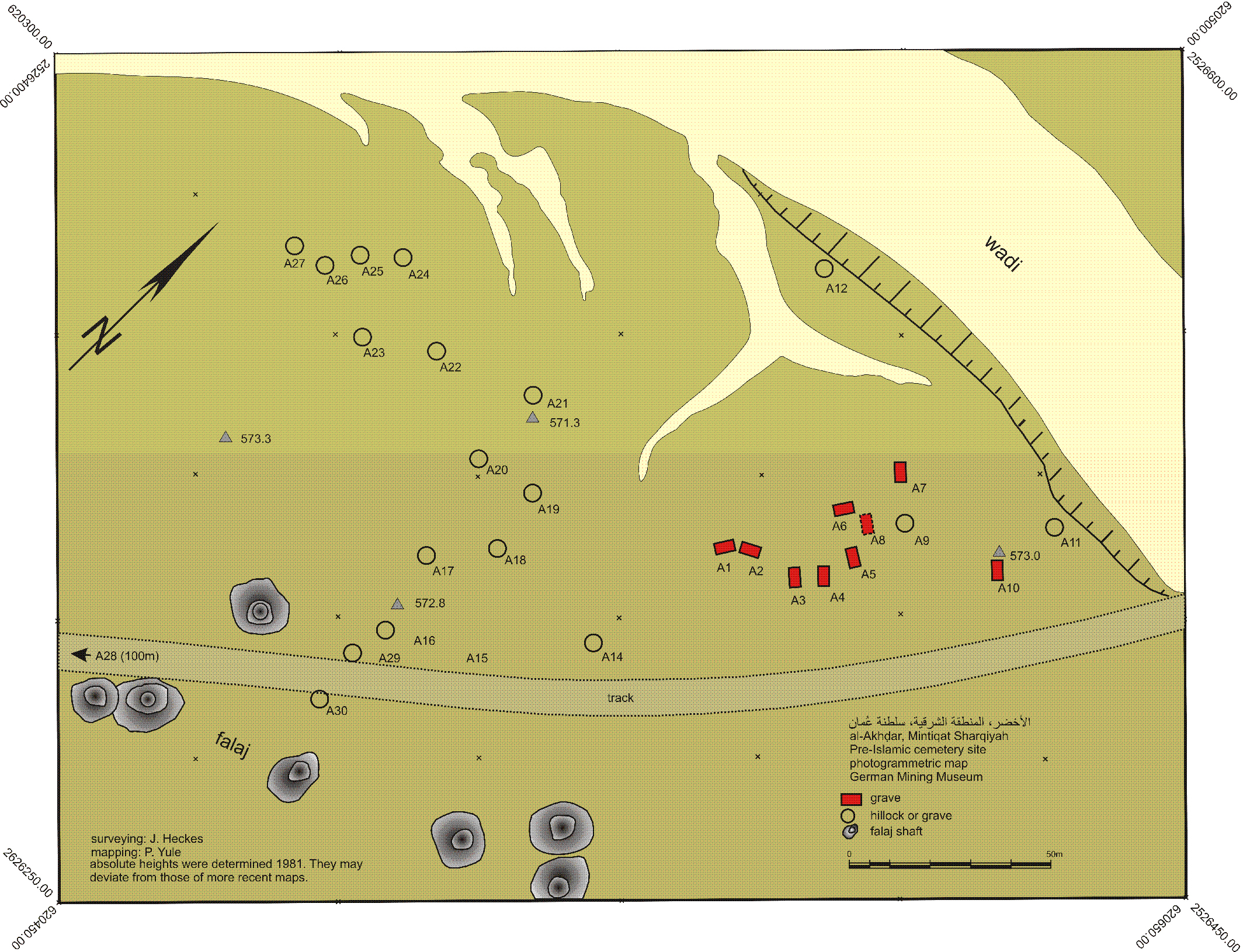
Plan of the site, 1981

The site is located next to the Wadi Samad. In 1973–4, Shaikh Hamdan al-Harthi, a resident of Samad al-Shan, informed the newly formed Department of Antiquities of the existence of pre-Islamic graves at this site. A British team led by D. Brian Doe and Beatrice de Cardi surveyed the site and put it in their gazetteer.

In 1980, Gerd Weisgerber began to record the finds and visited the site when he could. In 1981, B. Vogt and A. Tillmann of the German Mining Museum in Bochum excavated the site. Paul Yule used some of the finds for his study of the Samad Late Iron Age. A full report was published in 2015.

This archaeological site, like most in the Sultanate is in danger of being built on or otherwise destroyed.

== See also ==
- Archaeology of Oman
