= Samet =

Samet may refer to:

- Samet (name)
- Samet, Buriram, a subdistrict in Thailand
- Samad, a Semitic name rendered as Samet in Turkish
- Ko Samet, one of the Eastern Seaboard Islands of Thailand
