= Lizq =

Archaeological site in Oman

- لزق (Arabic)
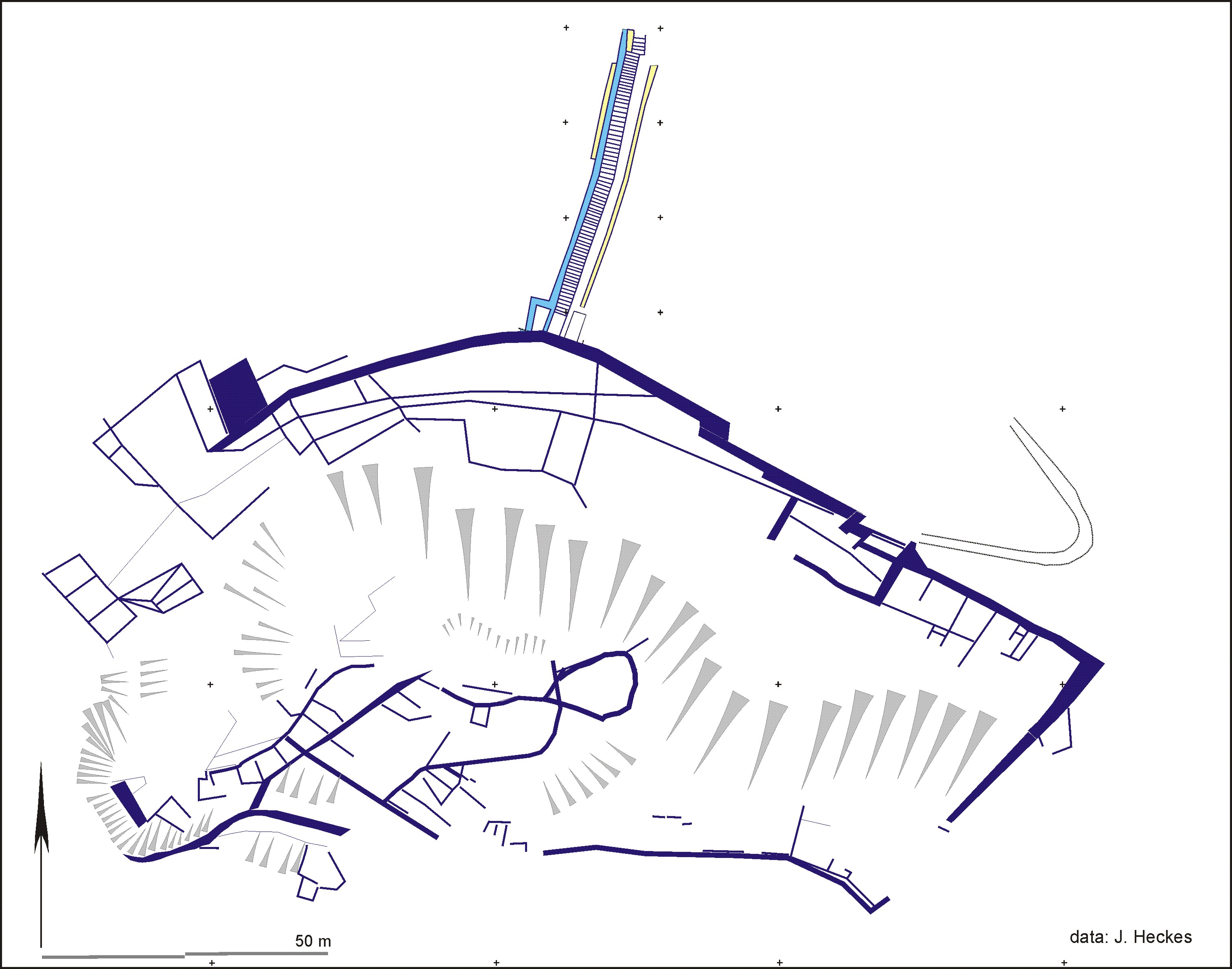
- Plan of the Early Iron Age fort Lizq L1

- Location within Oman
- 22°41′52.5″N 58°10′58.75″E
- Type: Fortification
- Periods: Iron Age
- Satellite of: Lizq
- Location: Lizq, Ash Sharqiyah North Governorate, Oman
- Region: Eastern Arabia

History
- Built: Early Iron Age

Site notes
- Material: Stone
- Length: 110 m (360 ft)
- Width: 170 m (560 ft)
- Area: 2 ha (4.9 acres)
- Excavation dates: 1981
- Archaeologists: Stephan Kroll
- Discovered: 1979
- Condition: Ruined

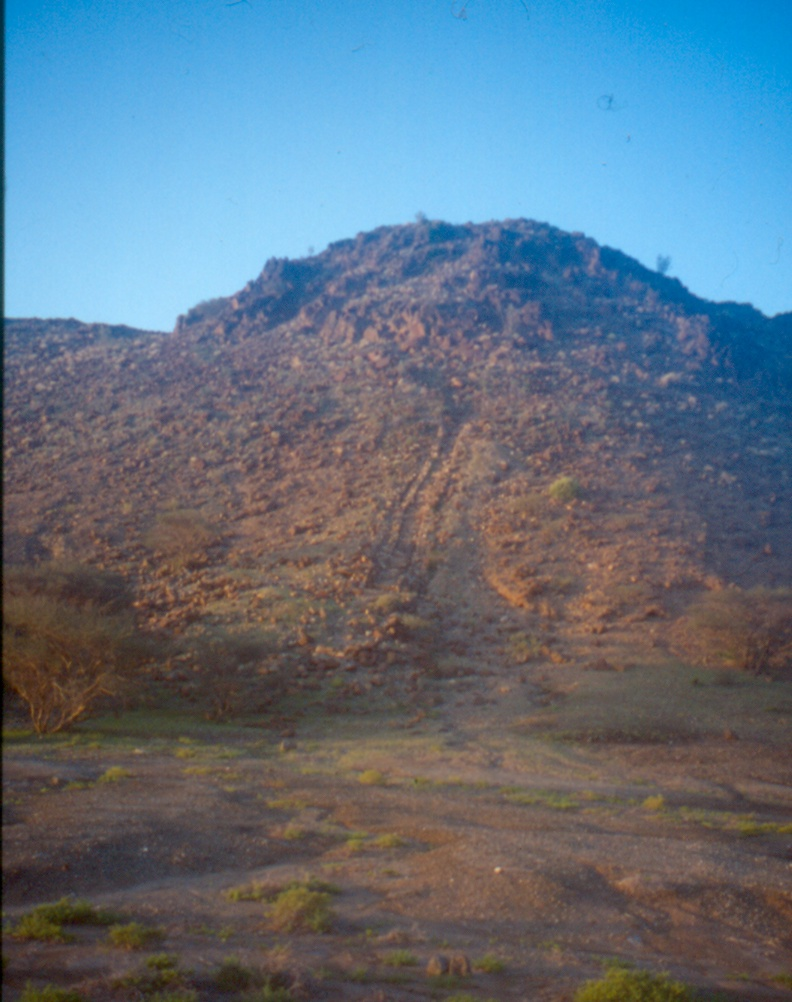
Northern face of the Jebel Radhania (or Jebel Ruwaydhah), on top of which the Early Iron Age Lizq fort, L1, was built

Lizq is an archaeological site in Ash Sharqiyah, Oman. Located on a mountain lying in a plain, 1,000 metres (1,100 yd) south-east of the south-eastern edge of the Lizq palm garden, the fort dates to the Lizq-Rumaylah/Early Iron Age.

== Description ==
The site was discovered in 1979 during the archaeological exploration of Gerd Weisgerber of the German Mining Museum (Deutsches Bergbau-Museum) in Bochum. Shaikh Hamdan al-Harthy of Samad led Weisgerber to the site. In 1981 a single season long German archaeological team mapped and conducted minimal rescue excavation. They did an ad hoc restoration of the stairs which lead up the northern face of the mountain. Since there are several sites near Lizq town, the fort is disambiguated as 'L1'.

The Lizq fort owes its existence to the reliable occurrence of water at a natural causeway at the southern side of the central mountains. The main fort on the western mountain peak is some 175 metres (575 ft) wide and has a surface of more than 20,000 square metres (5 acres) in surface area. This makes it the largest Early Iron Age fort in central Oman. The location of the Iron Age village associated with the fort remains unknown. No falaj was discovered.

Important is Kroll's comparison of the pottery with that of Iron Age Iran.

== See also ==
- Archaeology of Oman
