= Najd (disambiguation) =

Najd or Nejd (Arabic: نجد) is a region of the Arabian Peninsula under the control of Saudi Arabia.

Najd or Nejd may also refer to:

- Emirate of Nejd, (1824–1891)
- Sultanate of Nejd, (1921–1926)
- Najd, Gaza, a former Palestinian village near Gaza City
- Al-Nejd, Sultanate of Oman, an archaeological site in Central Oman
- An Najd, a village in Yemen
- Najd FC, a Saudi Arabian football team
