= Archaeology of Oman =

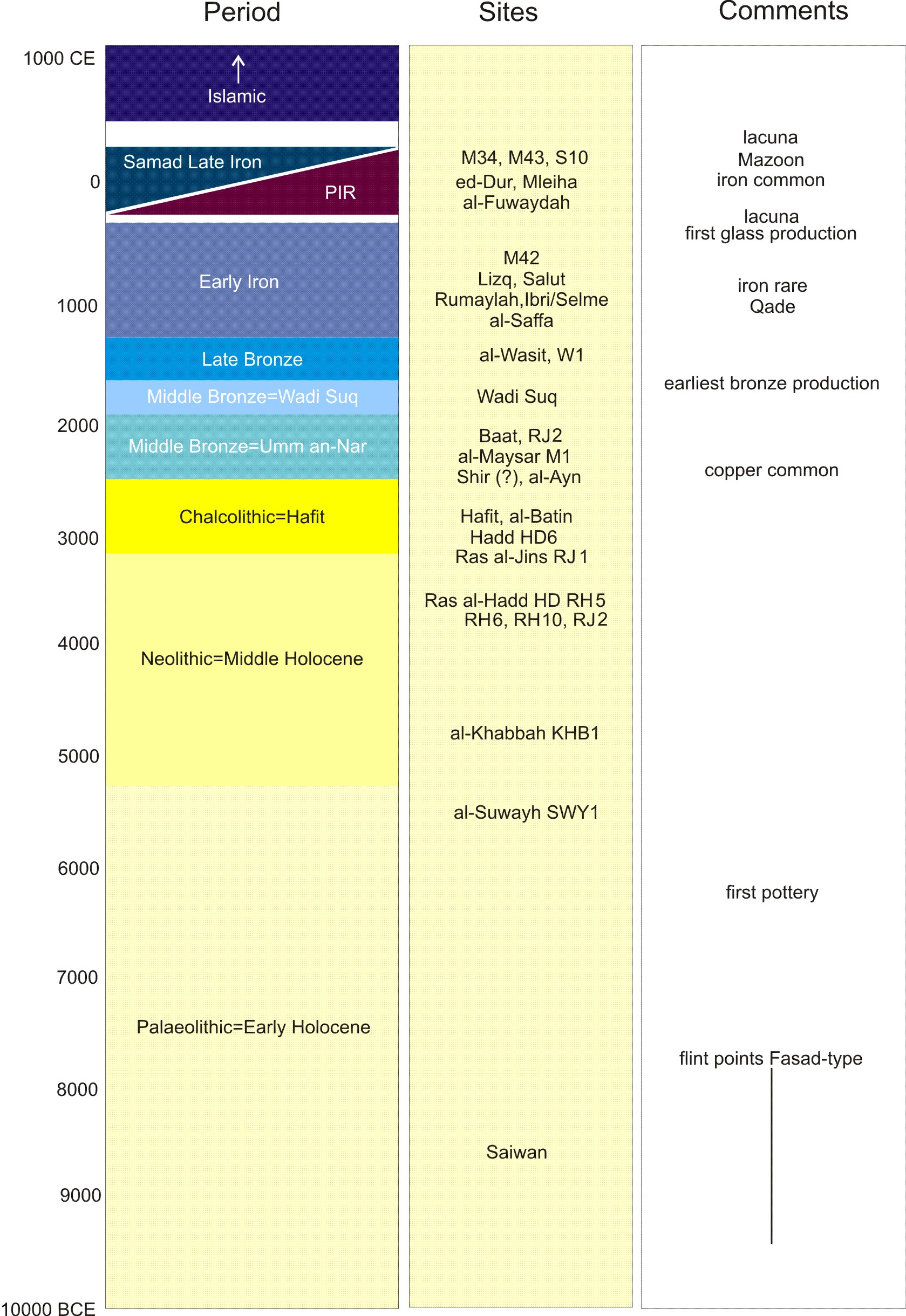
table of the chronology for the archaeology of Central Oman.

The present-day Sultanate of Oman lies in the south-eastern Arabian Peninsula. There are different definitions for Oman: traditional Oman includes the present-day United Arab Emirates (U.A.E.), though its prehistoric remains differ in some respects from the more specifically defined Oman proper, which corresponds roughly with the present-day central provinces of the Sultanate. In the north, the Oman Peninsula is more specific, and juts into the Strait of Hormuz. The archaeology of southern Oman Dhofar develops separately from that of central and northern Oman.

Different ages are reflected in typological assemblages, Old Stone (Paleolithic) Age, New Stone (Neolithic) Age, Copper Age, Bronze Age, Early Iron Age, Late Iron Age, and the Age of Islam. A "period" is an inferred classification from recurring artifact assemblages, sometimes associated with cultures. Ages, on the other hand, are on a much larger scale; they are conventional, but difficult to date absolutely—partially due to different rates of regional development. A barometer of transition is the amount of industry and manufacturing going on, particularly that of copper—refused as slag—and other metallic artifacts. The absolute dates for the different periods are still under study and it is difficult to assign years to the Late Iron Age of central and southern Oman. Even major monuments have been dated variously, spanning millennia. (moved from the last paragraph)

Archaeologically speaking, differences increase between the area of the present-day U.A.E. and the Sultanate particularly toward the end of the Early Iron Age, conditioned locally by the different geographical situations. The amount of moisture dictates the carrying capacity of the area, with a variety of subsistence strategies used to exploit the available resources. Since archaeological field work began in the early 1970s, numerous teams have worked in the Sultanate.

== Prehistoric period ==
=== Paleolithic ===
The Paleolithic age ranges from 3 million to about 10,000 years ago, with anatomically modern human occupation outside of Africa beginning about 100,000 years ago, bringing their ways of life with them. Theories state that the Nubian Tool Complex (c. 128,000-74,000 years ago) spread from Africa to the Arabian Peninsula during the Late Pleistocene, via the Red Sea. This theory was headed by the Dhofar Archaeological Project (DAP) in 2010 to 2011, when they surveyed and discovered Levalloisian cores—a recognizable type of the complex—Wadi Abyut, central Dhofar. The team had ruled that the Nubian Complex only extended into Western Oman.

A slightly more recent series of surveys, the French Mission of Adam conducted from 2007 to 2013, found numerous lithic artifacts scattered about many hills in the Adam area, specifically in the Sufrat Valley. They dated the finds, based on typo-technological traits to mostly the Middle and Upper Paleolithic. Levalloisian, wa'shah, laminar, and bifacial lithic remains were primary tool types found.

=== Neolithic ===
The Neolithic Age coincides with the beginning of the Holocene and sees the advent of a food producing, or agricultural, society, as opposed to hunting and gathering; it ranges loosely from about 10,000-3,500 BCE. The process was slightly different in the Arabian Peninsula; as animal husbandry was first to arise in 5500 BCE in the area of Oman and agriculture did not arise until the early Bronze Age. Rather, fishing became more diversified and tools more specialized; about 80% of the bone assemblage at Ra's al-Hamra' specifically was fish, mostly made up by larger fish caught with things like nets and line fishing—determined by a collection of fishhooks and net-sinkers.

Key sites on the Western Coast include shell middens at Ra's al-Ḥamrā' and Suwayh—where indication of some mother-of-pearl fishhooks were located--, Ra's al-Ḥadd, Ra's Dah, and Maṣīrah. Their middens were dated using radiocarbon techniques and dated circa the middle of the fifth to the third millennium BCE. Several sites exhibited evidence of structures; semi-circular or circular constructions delineated by postholes, hearths, and middens. Some of these middens also held human burials, which of course contained grave goods mostly consisting of simple jewelry. Beads from shells are found all up and down the coast into the UAE. Though certain types of shells which are not naturally occurring in the UAE are found in jewelry there, indicating that there was some sort of trade between communities in Oman, where there shells occurred, and communities in the UAE.

In 2010, the French Mission of Adam located Jabal al-'Aluya; an in-land site with 127 structural remains of varying shapes and compositions, supposed to be hut-like dwellings, hearths, and graves—similar to those discussed above. Of the lithic assemblage found, cores were fairly rare, with mostly blades and laminar flakes being observed. The site is associated with the latter part of 4000 BCE.

A site named Al-Dahariz 2, located in the Dhofar governance, has been found to contain fluted-point lithics—a form before thought to be unique to the Americas. The fluted technology has a large, linear chunk taken out from the bottom or top of the lithic, creating a lighter projectile that can keep its sharpness. However, the current theory is that the lithics were non-functional and actually communicated cultural value and exhibited the skill of the craftsperson.

== Copper Age ==
The Copper Age in this geographic location partially coincides with the Hafit Period (3100-2700 BCE), known originally from a cemetery site on the Jebel Hafit in the UAE, though attributed artifacts extend well into the Sultanate. Most burials are located on hill sides, with deposits of supposed pottery imports from southern Mesopotamia. Such finds have been documented on the eastern coast of the Sultanate near Ra's al-Hadd, especially HD-6 and Ra's al-Jinz. Also present in the tombs was diagnostic pottery of Jemdet Nasr period type. As for copper, crucibles with metal traces, small furnaces, and about 300 copper tools were found at Ras al-Jinz.

Copper smelting began perhaps at al-Batina, however such ores would leave little slag and the process did not require special conditions, so there would be little to indicate its presence in the archaeological record. Already at this time there is textual evidence from Sumer for international trade in copper and other commodities, probably from Oman.

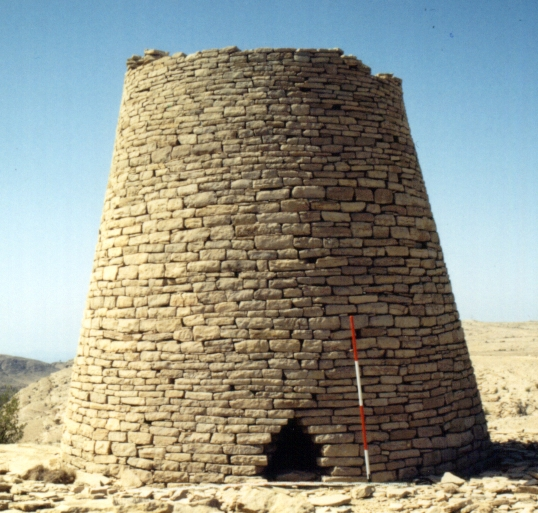
Tomb at Shir of the Umm an-Nar Period.

== Bronze Age ==
The Bronze Age typically ranges from 3300 to 1300 BCE, encompassing part of the Hafit period (3100-2700 BCE) and the Umm al-Nar (2700-2000 BCE) and Wadi Suq Periods (2000 - 1300 BCE).

=== Early Bronze Age ===
During this age, metal production increased considerably in relation to that of the preceding Hafit Period, with several plano-convex copper ingots, weighing 1–2 kg, being found. Tower or beehive tombs, such as those at Shir, can only be approximately dated, and may date to the Hafit or Umm al-Nar Periods. During the Umm al-Nar Period, large communal, free-standing tombs contain numerous interments and were more common. Other tombs are smaller and may contain one or a few interments.

Similar tombs to those at Shir appear in the area of Shenah, which is already slightly famous for its rock-art sites. A 2006 survey counted 325 beehive tombs, dating from the late fourth to the early third millennium. They either have single or double stacked walls of mostly limestone or sandstone, with short, rectangular entrances that face the East. All of them built directly on top of the bedrock, with no indication of any digging before building took place.

The site known as Al-Khashbah, was the focus of a surveying project by the University of Tübingen in 2015. The various pedestrian surveys found slag and metal objects, furnace fragments, stone vessels, jewelry, stone tools, and glass objects. They located approximately 200 tombs and 10 monumental structures that could be dated to circa the 3rd millennium BCE, with some more specifically dating to the earlier Hafit period and others dating to the later Umm al-Nar period. Some of these monumental structures were towers with some evidence for copper processing; as some scholars have suggested that various stone tools—not just classical anvils and pounding stones—played important roles in the process of beneficiation of copper. However, some other buildings had indications of flint knapping.

In 1982, a potsherd attributed to the Indus Valley Civilization was found at Ras al-Jinz, located at the easternmost point of the Arabian Peninsula. It was considered landmark proof that at least coastal Oman was connected to India in the third millennium BCE. Also found there, were pieces of bitumen impressed with what appeared to be ropes, reed mats, and wood planks, with a few of the fragments still housing barnacles; implying it was caulking for an early boat.

In Dhofār weapons came to light in a confirmed grave context datable to the 3rd millennium BCE.

=== Late Bronze Age ===
The Late Bronze Age is mostly represented by grave goods and excavated settlements. It includes the last 200, 1500 to 1300 BCE, years of the Wadi Suq period.

Of the structures found Al-Khashbah, only six tombs, all of them subterranean, could be dated to the 2nd millennium and the Wadi Suq period.

== Iron Age ==
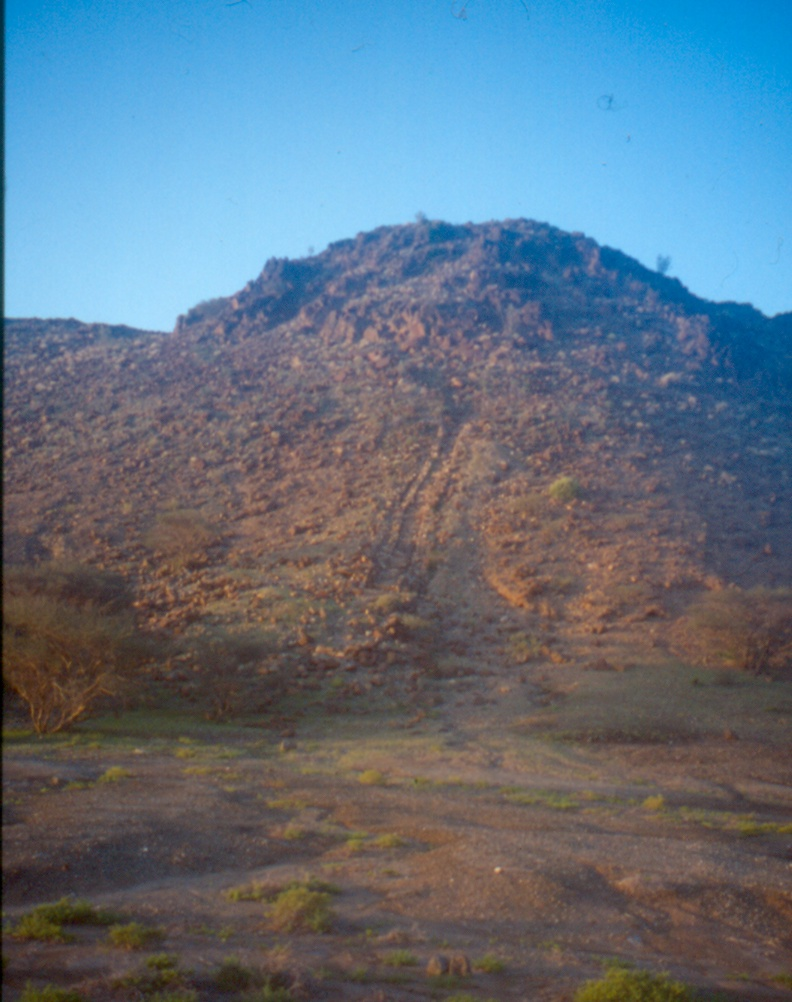
Northern face of the Jebel Radhania (or Ruwadhah), on top of which the Early Iron Age Lizq fort, L1, was built.

The Iron Age is divided into two different periods, 'Iron Age A' (1300-300 BCE) and 'Iron Age B' (325 BCE-650 CE).

=== Early Iron Age ===
Known from different cemetery and copper producing sites, especially the fort on the Jebel Radhania, Lizq and the fort at Salut. the Early Iron Age is generally accepted as lasting from 1300 to 300 BCE. This period is known from some 142 archaeological sites located in the eastern part of the U.A.E. as well as the central and northern parts of the Sultanate of Oman. One scholar in particular offered concrete argumentation for a gradual transition as a model from the Early to Late Iron Ages at certain sites in Central Oman. However, graves goods show no similarities between the two periods.

Usually hand-made and hard-fired, the pottery from the Lizq fort is most similar to that from the latest Early Iron Age sites at al-Moyassar (or al-Maysar) and Samad al-Shan. In terms of pottery chronology, its beginnings there are obscure.

The dead are interred in existing subterranean tombs or in new, hut-like free-standing ones. All of the tombs of given group may be oriented in one direction, however, different groups deviate from each other. The inhabitants must have considered their society to be a safe one since they built such visible and vulnerable free-standing tombs with poor chances of survival and as a ready source of building materials have rapidly disappeared since 1980. No intact tomb of this period has ever been excavated.

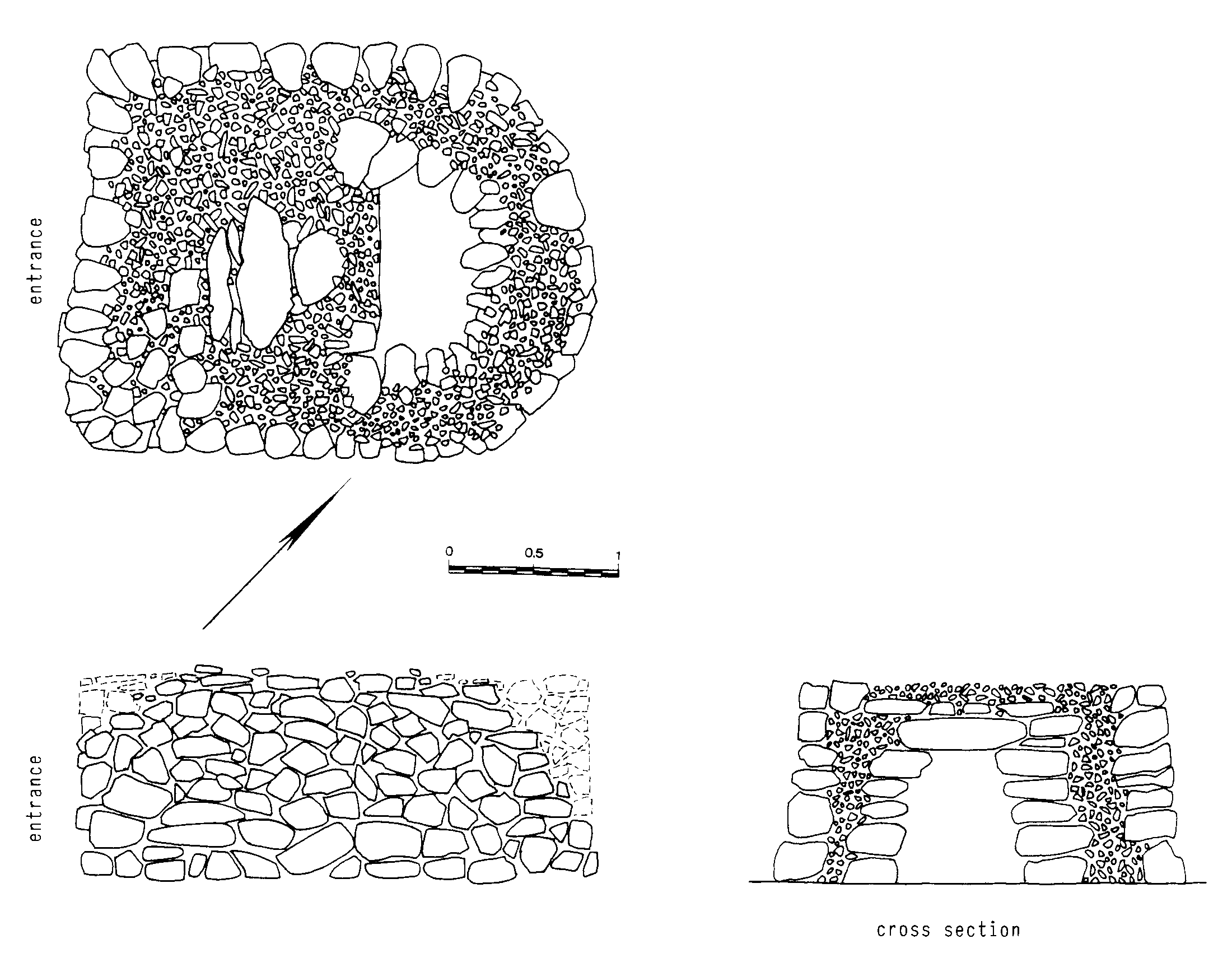
Orthographic view of a hut tomb at Bilād al-Maʿdin in eastern Oman. Several examples contain late pre-Islamic finds

The number of copper-alloy artifacts reaches a peak at this time which will only be surpassed around the 9th century CE. The reason is that the technology to roast the more abundant sulfidic copper ore was developed. A hoard of over 500 copper alloy artefacts at ʿIbrī/Selme gives a fair idea of the production at this time. In 2012, another copper and iron metal-working workshop came to light first reported incorrectly as at 'al-Saffah', when in reality this site is known as ʿUqdat al-Bakrah. More than 400 metallic artifacts often found close shape correspondences with those from ʿIbrī/Selme.

An important connection with the outside world comes to bear in a cuneiform inscription (640 BCE) of the Neo-Assyrian king Assurbanipal; he mentions emissaries sent by a king by the name of Pade who resides in Izki in the land of Qade. It yielded to date nearly 700 metallic artifacts. The introduction of the falaj for irrigation coincides with the rapid growth of date as a main crop. The chronology for this age resembles but also differs from the better known one of the present-day U.A.E. During this Iron Age paradoxically in Oman iron artifacts are rather rare, although in neighbouring Iran after 1200 BCE iron weapons are characteristic. Pre-Arabic place-names such as Nizwa, Izki, Rustaq and ʿIbri probably represent the bare remnants of the language and speakers of this and the next age.

In November, 2019, 45 well-preserved tombs covering a 50-80 square metre area and a settlement, dating back to beginning of the Iron Age, were discovered in Al-Mudhaibi by archaeologists from Oman and Heidelberg University. Archaeologists believed that the site was inhabited by the miners of the nearby copper.

=== Samad Late Iron Age ===
At the end of the Early Iron Age—after some 200–300 years without absolutely dated archaeological contexts—weak evidence appears for the Samad Late Iron Age from 300 BCE to 250 CE, as dated by thermoluminescence, radiocarbon and a few outside artefact comparisons. As of 2026, this assemblage is known from 116 attributed archaeological sites in over 30 localities. Evidence for a transition from the EIA (Early Iron Age) is rare in eastern Oman and the chronological situation is clearest at the multi-period site complex at al-Moyassar, where falaj water sites from the EIA, LIA (Late Iron Age), and medieval periods survive to this day. Over the centuries, and especially recently, the water table dropped, so that the falaj floor had to be lowered to the height of the water table. This period was witness to a drastic reduction in population for reasons unknown. Evident during this period is also a loss of copper-producing technology.

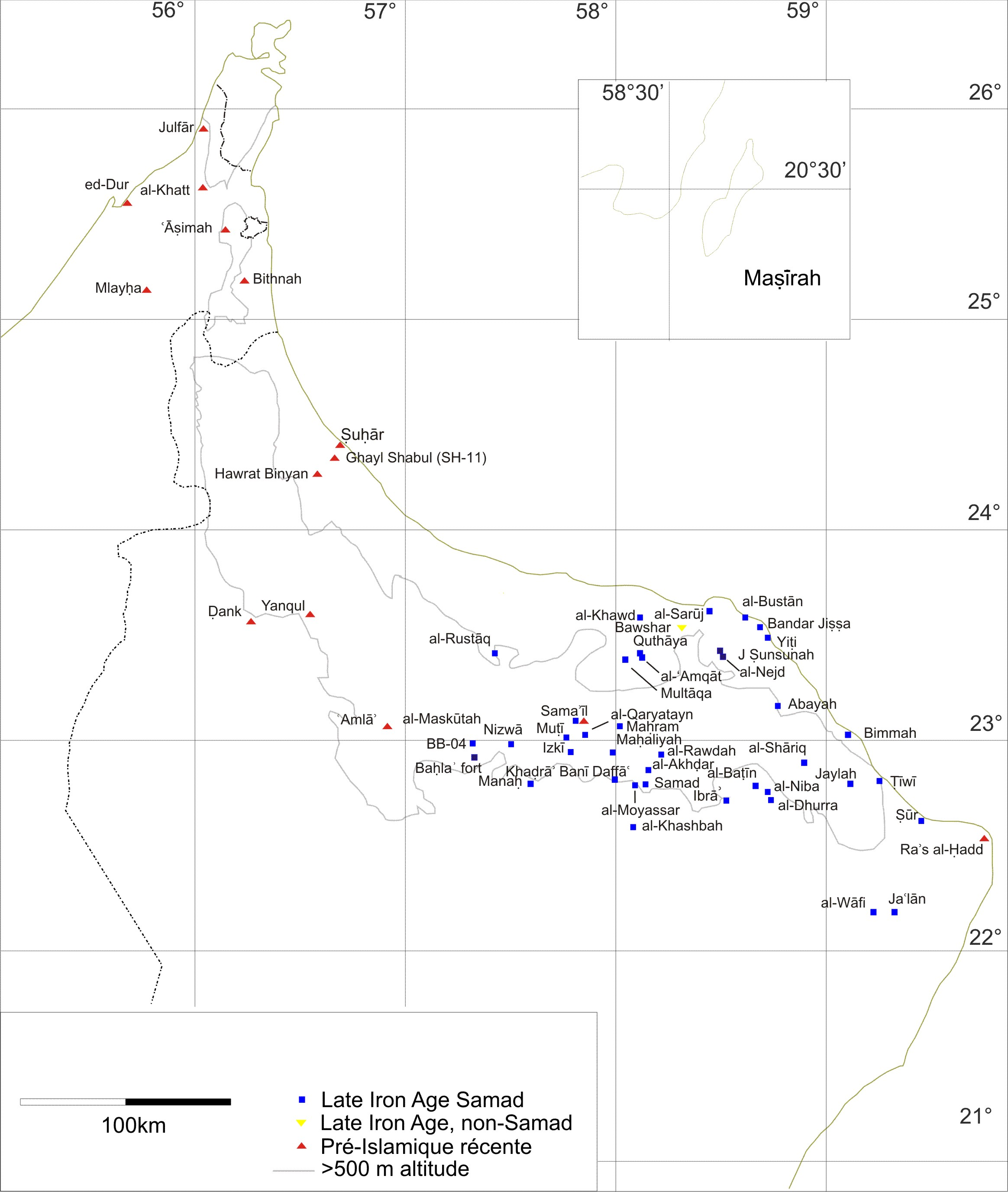
Eastern Oman, Late Iron Age sites

Samad LIA sites scatter over an estimated 17,000 km^{2} (6,600 sq mi) bordered to the west in Izkī, to the north in the capital area, to the south Jaʿlān, and to the east at the coast. An assemblage attributable to the Samad period is absent in the Bāṭinah and is limited basically to the Sharqīyah province. Samad al-Shan and smaller sites, such as al-Akhdhar, al-Amqat, Bawshar and al-Bustan, are type-sites for this non-writing population, with mostly hand-made pottery, copper-alloy, and iron artefacts. Reoccurring pottery wares and shapes, small finds, as well as a few grave structure types define the Samad Late Iron Age assemblage.

Where the soil is deep enough, individual stone-built graves are sunk into the earth. Such classical Samad graves have a low wall on the roof near the north-western end perpendicular to the long axis. They contain flexed skeletons, with the men usually are placed on the right side and the women usually on the left, their heads generally point toward the south-east.

Few fragmentary settlements—Mahaliya, al-Nejd, Nejd Madirah, Qaryat al-Saiḥ in Wadi Maḥram, Samad al-Shan sites S1, S7, ʿUmq al-Rabaḫ, Ṭīwī site TW2—have been documented.

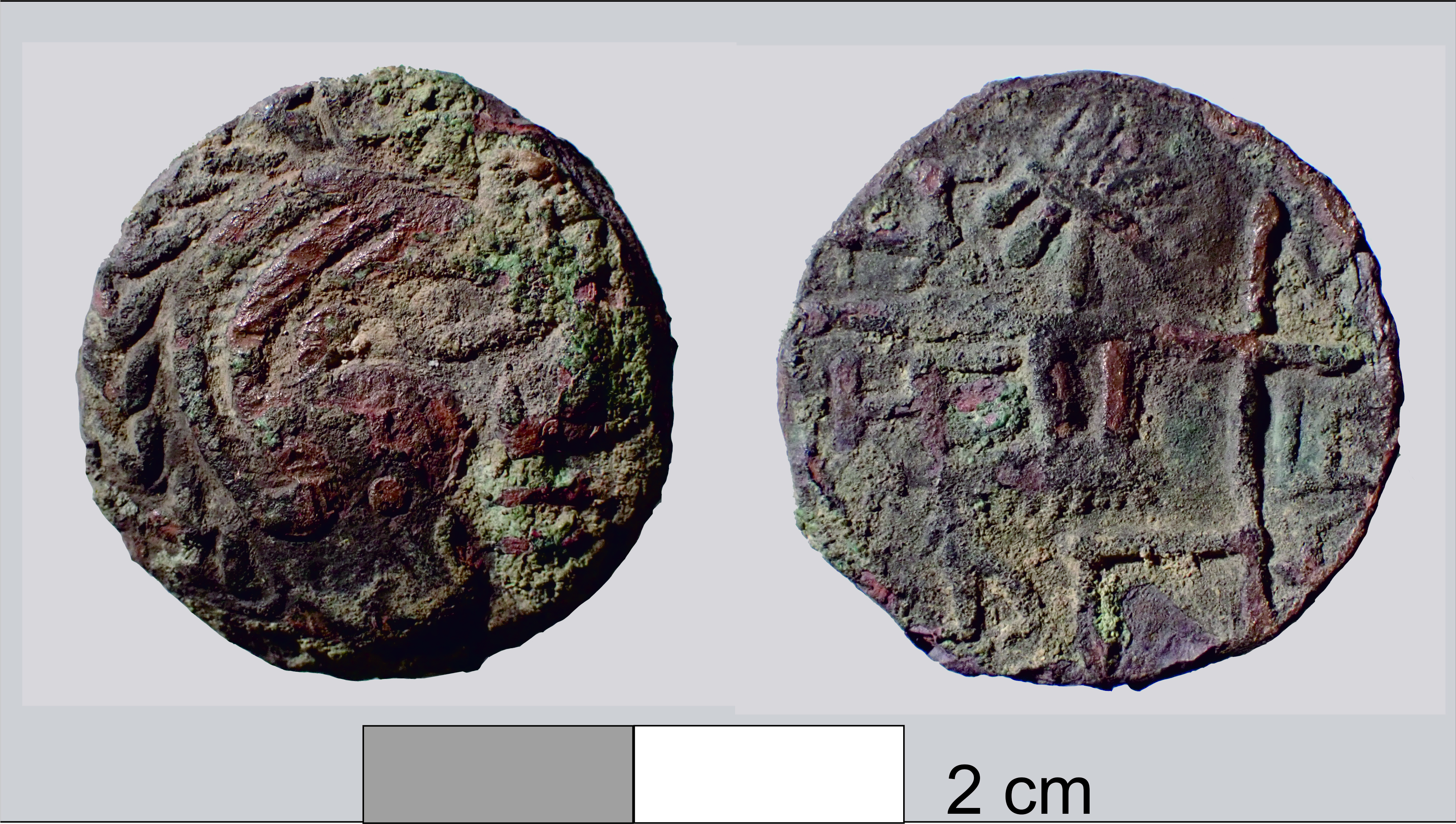
Abiel coin excavated from Mahaliya, presently in the National Museum, Muscat

No coins were struck locally, and to date only three examples have turned up in contexts together with Samad Late Iron Age pottery, while the northern part of traditional Oman had at least partly a currency economy, Central Oman did not.

In the LIA several glazed pottery imports derive from the upper Gulf and southern Mesopotamia. One class of pottery, balsamaria, are wheel-turned and also are common in the late Pre-Islamic Late Iron Age graves in UAE sites. Approximately 3/4 of the find inventories in Central Oman finds are attributable to the Samad assemblage, far fewer to the recent pre-Islamic period, and a few cannot be attributed to a definable assemblage. Persian Achaemenid, Parthian, and Sasanian dominance of Oman is firmly entrenched in the secondary literature. The integrity of the Samad late Iron Age rests on its site gazetteer and recent publication.

Parthian, and later Sasanian, invaders from Iran temporarily dominated certain towns politically and militarily, but for logistical reasons, it was only possible to occupy a few sites, as occurred during later invasions. Persian presence is inferred by a few place-names near or on the coast (e.g. al-Rustaq) and personal names in Izki. It appears that, at this time in Central Oman, so-called Modern South Arabian languages were spoken. For the Early Iron Age this is far less certain. From ±500 BCE to ±500 CE or later, waves of migratory tribes from South and Central Arabia settle in south-eastern Arabia and Iran, as we know from oral historical sources. If so, then at least at first linguistically such populations were South Arabians and not Arabs. The tribal grounds of the Azd tribes in south-eastern Arabia of course are far larger and more diverse than the area of the Samad Late Iron Age sites. To judge from the Samad stone graves and from evidence about their diet, this was not Bedouin population, but rather consisted of farmers.

These tribes brought the South Arabian, later Arabic, linguistic variety with them as far east as Khorasan in Iran. However, Omani Arabic has its own words and is not just an import from Central Arabia. It is assumed that Classical Arabic arrived with the Arab diaspora and Islam in the 7th and 8th centuries CE, first to the metropolitan centres. The occurrence in Arabia and the Red Sea littoral of ribbed amphorae manufactured in Aqaba/Ayla evidently in order to transport wine, shows the area just north of Aqaba to have been a fruitful agricultural area from 400 up to possibly 1000. On the other hand, Dr. Fleitmann has studied stalagmites from al-Hutah Cave in central Oman and has gathered information for a series of megadroughts especially around 530 CE. These may have afflicted the entire Peninsula.

=== non-Samad Late Iron Age ===
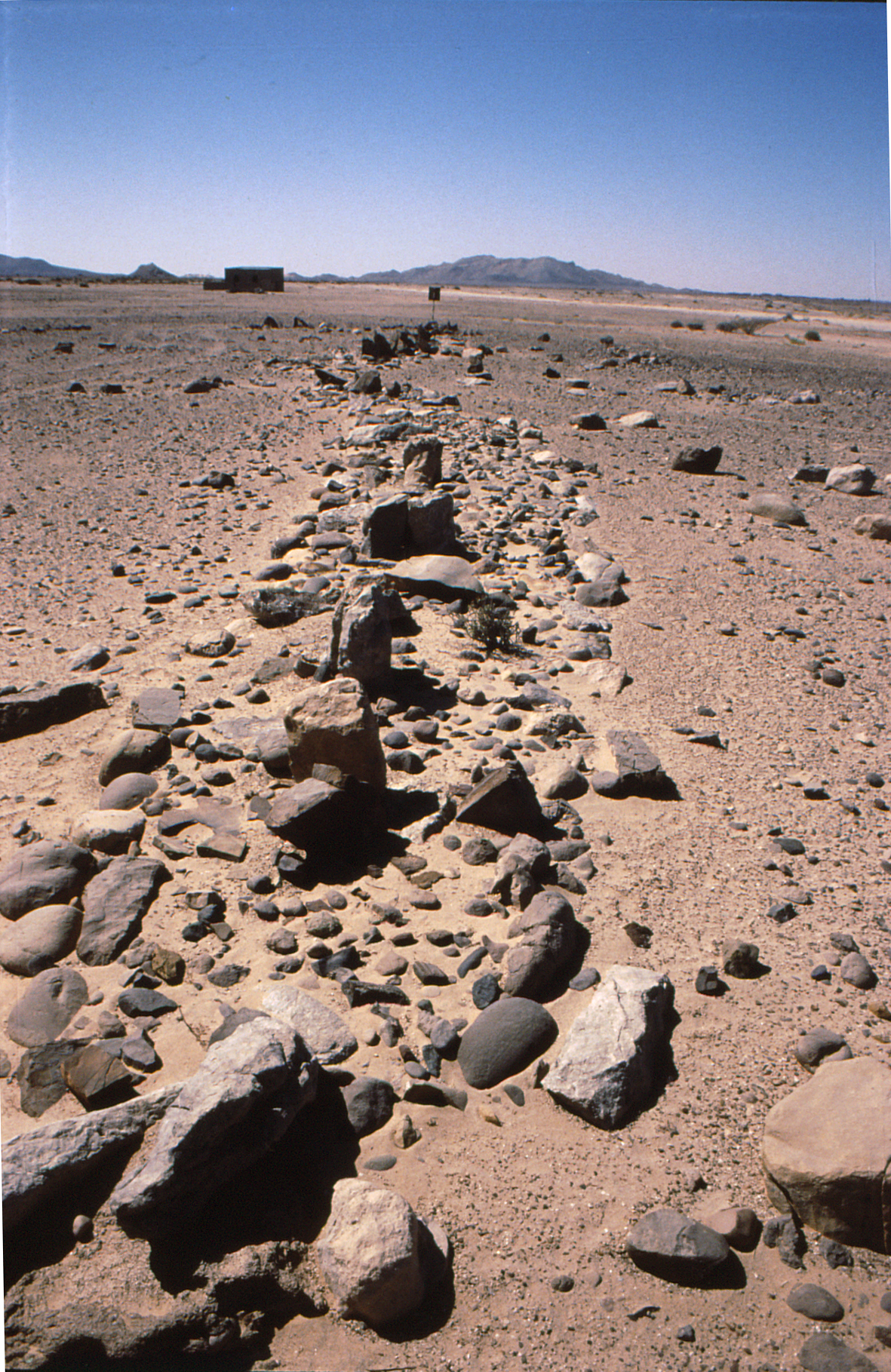
A trilith at the site near al-Jawābī in the Ṣūr Wilayat.

Several Late Iron Age sites do not link in terms of form and details of manufacture of their artifacts with the Samad characteristic assemblage. For example, the weapons are differently fashioned, as in one grave at Bawshar. Curiously, some of the monuments previously described as megalithic, are now described as 'small stone monuments'. The term megalith has been used and misused in a wide variety of meanings; triliths found in Oman differ from ones in Europe in size and shape. The most important example are triliths (Arab. ʿathfiya/ʿathāfy) - rowed groups of three stones perched together to form a steep pyramid. A fourth stone may lie horizontally on top. Triliths usually lie in wadis, the main habitation area of nomads. Scholars have suggested a connection between the speakers of the Modern South Arabian Language, Mahra, and the triliths. To judge from Mehra place-names and the triliths, Mahri speakers lived further to the north until Bedouin tribes pushed them into the south. The triliths are the only find-category that central and southern Oman hold in common. A connection with Ṧḥahrī/Ǧibbāli is also plausible since triliths lie in areas in which today this language group still is actively spoken.

The Pre-Islamic recent period is known from different sites in the Sultanate, for example probably ʿAmlāʾ/Amlah, al-Fuwaydah. Such sites are largely contemporary with Late Iron Age of Samad in Central Oman, especially in the Sharqiyah. In the U.A.E. such show evidence of writing such as on coins. Regarding the relative chronology of the two there is considerable consensus. However, a difficulty in order to build a chronology lies in the lack of clear artefactual parallels between the Samad assemblage and that of these sites. At the partially excavated cemetery site of al-Fuwaydah the artifacts, especially pottery and metalwork, are more similar to contemporary ones from the U.A.E. than to those of Samad.

==== Iron Age in Dhofar ====
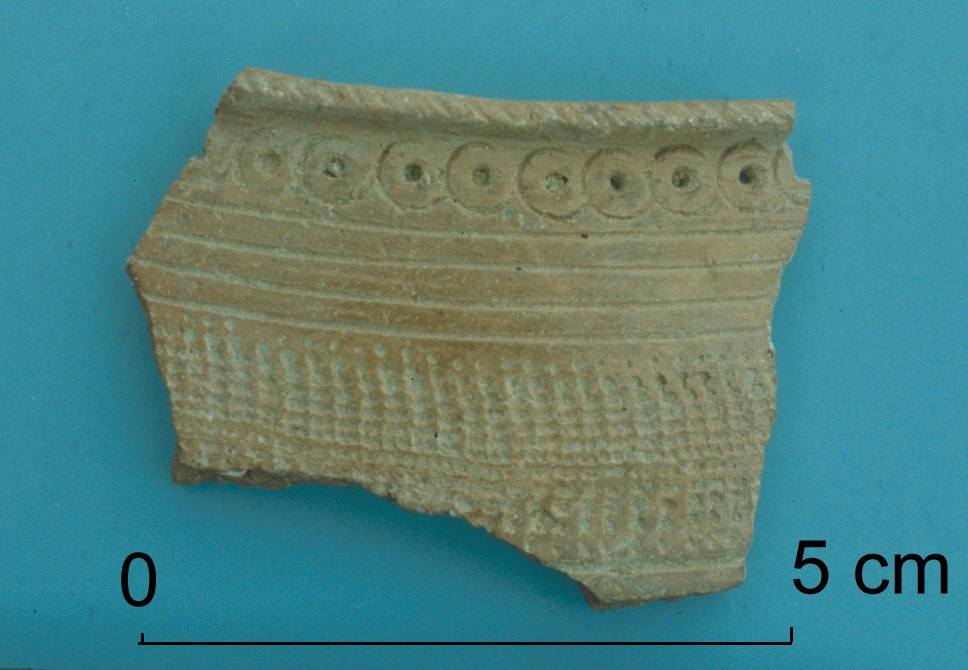
Sherd of medieval pottery from Khor Rori in southern Oman

Various survey and a few excavations have shed light on the archaeology of the South Province of the Sultanate; the largest and best-known site is Khor Rori, a trading fort established by the Hadhramite kingdom in the 3rd century BCE. While this site shows a mixture of artifacts, many of which are of Old South Arabian type, the surrounding countryside reveals a mélange of different kinds of artifacts. Khor Rori owes its existence to the trading of aromatics, in particular frankincense. The type of sherd depicted was for many years considered to be Late Iron Age, but recent research re-dates it to the medieval period.

== Islamic Age ==
Very little archaeological evidence from the early Islamic Age exists; the earliest building structures which survive date to medieval times. With the coming of Islam and the diaspora of Arabian tribes, the Arabic language took hold in Oman.

Copper production reaches a record high to judge from the amount of slag which has survived from 150 known smelting sites. With 100,000 tons of slag, Lasail, or more properly, al-Azayl, in Wadi Jizzi is the largest smelting site in Oman. The slag showed that the hill was mined away and processed in nearby furnaces, with part of the work also being carried out underground. Wooden supports found 40 meters underground marked evidence of the underground work, with theories supposing that the tunnels caved in. A similar site, Semdah, was undermined and over-exploited, thus a cave in occurred.

== Sources ==
- Michel Mouton, La péninsule d'Oman de la fin de l'âge du fer au début de la période sasanide (250 av. – 350 ap. JC), 1992, BAR International Series 1776, (printed 2008).
- Daniel T. Potts, The Persian Gulf in Antiquity, 2 vols., Oxford 1992
- Paul A. Yule and Fausto Mauro At the dawn of history The late pre-Islamic age in south-eastern Arabia, Archaeopress: Ministry of Heritage and Tourism, vol. 14, Bichester: Archaeopress, and Ministry of Heritage & Tourism (2 editions) 2025, ISBN 978-1-80327-993-0, E-book ISBN 978-1-80327-994-7
- P. Yule & F. Mauro. Gazetteer ent slia_nlia_slia_pir_sas.xlsx, 2024

https://uni-heidelberg.academia.edu/paulyule/Drafts https://www.academia.edu/116164701/2024j_gazetteer_ent_slia_nlia_slia_pir_sas

== See also ==
- List of archaeological sites by country
- al-Akhdhar
- Amlah
- al-Amqat
- al-Bustan
- Mahri language
- al-Moyassar
- al-Nejd, Sultanate of Oman
- Izki
- Lizq
- Pre-Islamic recent period
- Qaryat al-Saih
- Samad al-Shan
- Tiwi, Oman
- ʿUmq al-Rabaḫ
- ʿUqdat al-Bakrah
