= Al-Akhdhar =

Omani archaeological site

Coordinates: 22°50′37″N 58°10′39″E

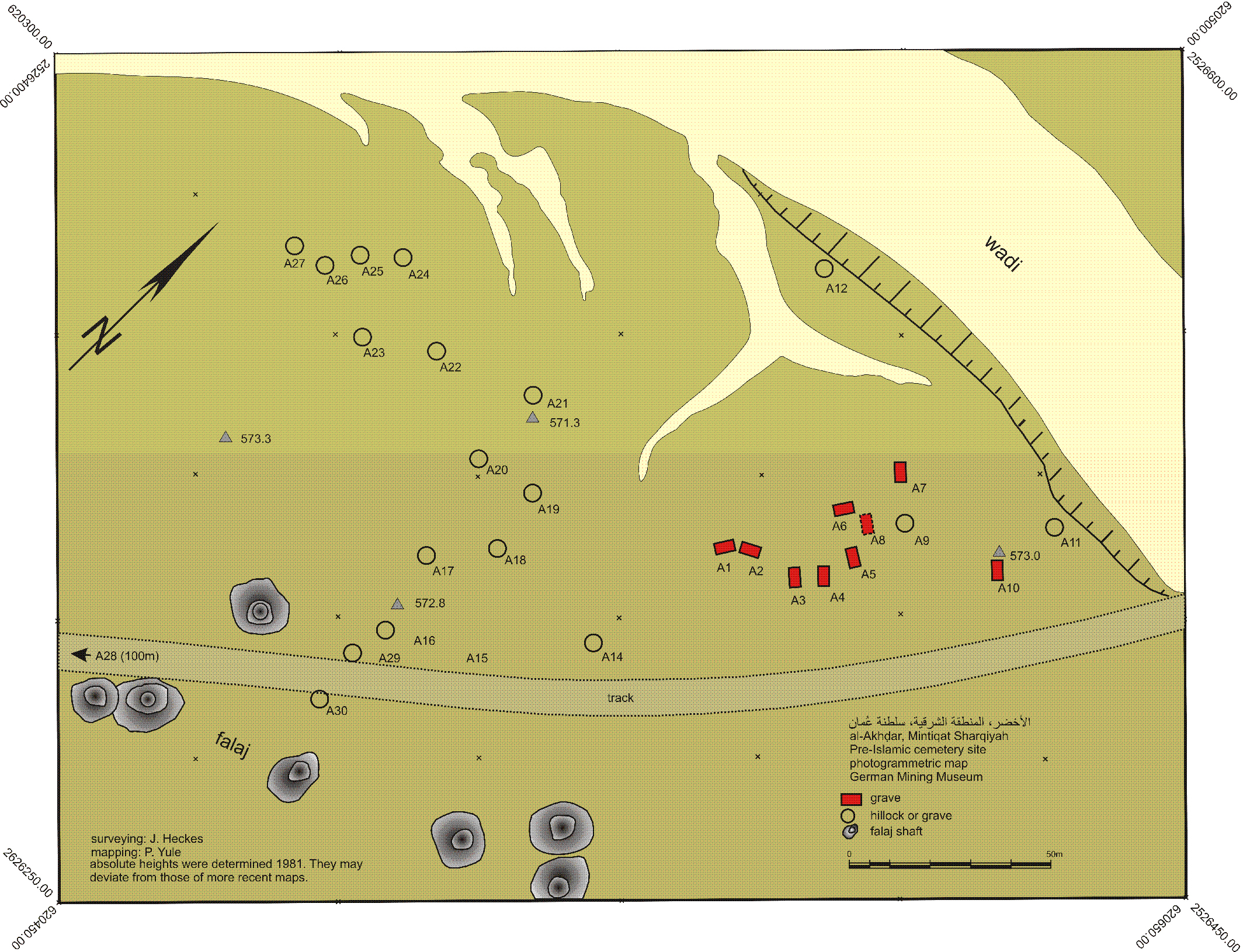
image description Map of the archaeological site of al-Akhdhar, al-Sharqiyah, Oman.

al-Akhḍar (literally, the green) in Wadi Samad (22°50'37"N, 58°10'39"E, 577 m altitude) is an archaeological site in Mudhaibi Wilayat Sharqiyah, in Central Oman. This cemetery was inhabited from the Umm an-Nar to the Samad Late Iron Age and during Islamic times.

== Sources ==
- Paul Yule, Die Gräberfelder in Samad al-Shan (Sultanat Oman): Materialien zu einer Kulturgeschichte (2001), ISBN 3-89646-634-8.
- Paul Yule, Cross-roads – Early and Late Iron Age South-eastern Arabia, Abhandlungen Deutsche Orient-Gesellschaft, vol. 30, Wiesbaden 2014, ISBN 978-3-447-10127-1
- Paul Yule, Valourising the Samad Late Iron Age, Arabian Archaeology and Epigraphy 27/1, 2016, 31‒71, ISSN 0905-7196
- Paul Yule–Gerd Weisgerber†, The Cemetery at al-Akhḍar near Samad al-Shān in the Sharqīya (Oman), Der Anschnitt, 2015, 111‒78,

== See also ==
- Archaeology of Oman
