= Al-Nejd, Sultanate of Oman =

Archaeological site in Oman

Coordinates: 23°23′34.16″N 58°31′7.70″E

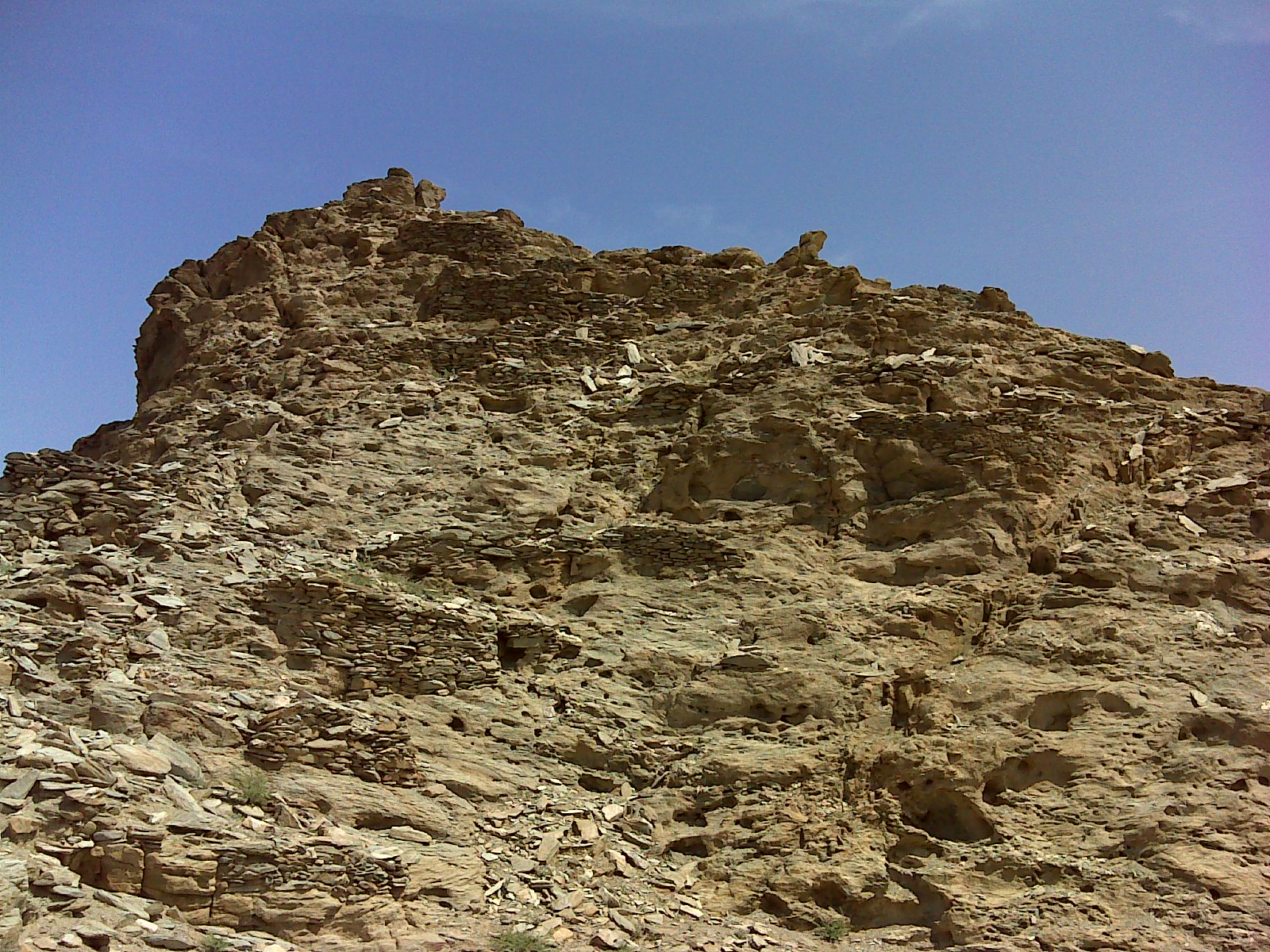
Photograph of the site

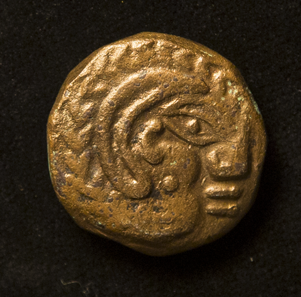
The imported tetradrachm confirmed as from the site

Al-Nejd is an archaeological site in Ash Sharqiyah, Oman. It was a fortified village inhabited during the Samad Late Iron Age and possibly during Islamic times. The site was discovered in 2014 following the chance find of a coin by a local resident, and was then confirmed and dated by a team from the Ministry of Heritage and Culture. The site yielded an Abiel tetradrachm, struck in what is now the United Arab Emirates. The coin is on display in the National Museum in Muscat.

Al-Nejd is fortified, has a garden and is directly near a water course (wadi), all characteristics of the Samad Late Iron Age.

== See also ==
- Archaeology of Oman
- Qaryat al-Saih
- Samad al-Shan
- ʿUmq al-Rabaḫ
