= Amlah =

Archaeological area in Oman

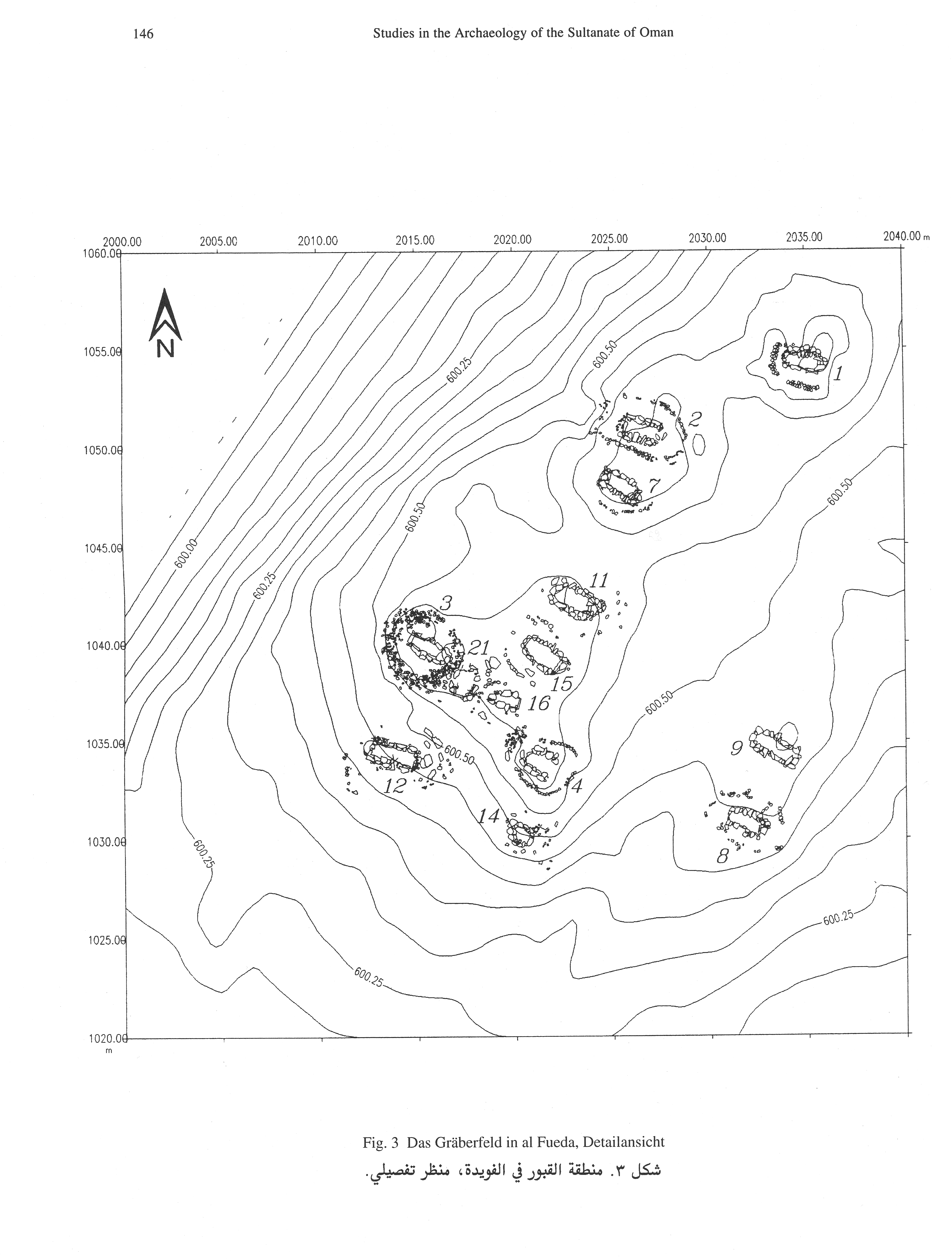
Plan of the cemetery at ʿAmlāʾ/al-Fuwaydah which is attributed to the 'Pre-Islamic Recent Period'.

Amlah or ʿAmlāʾ (23°07′52″N 56°54′07″E) is a location in al-Dhāhirah province (41 km ESE of ʿIbrī), Sultanate of Oman. The area around Amlah contains numerous archaeological sites which came to light during surveys in the mid 1970s. Those that are available to the public date from the Bronze Age Wadi Suq period to the late pre-Islamic period. 26 excavated graves provide evidence for a cemetery at al-Fuwaydah. The graves and grave goods are related most closely to those of the United Arab Emirates, Preislamique Récente, i.e. PIR, and not the Samad Late Iron Age. Among the most striking Late Iron Age finds are bronze phiales inscribed on the inside.

== Gallery ==
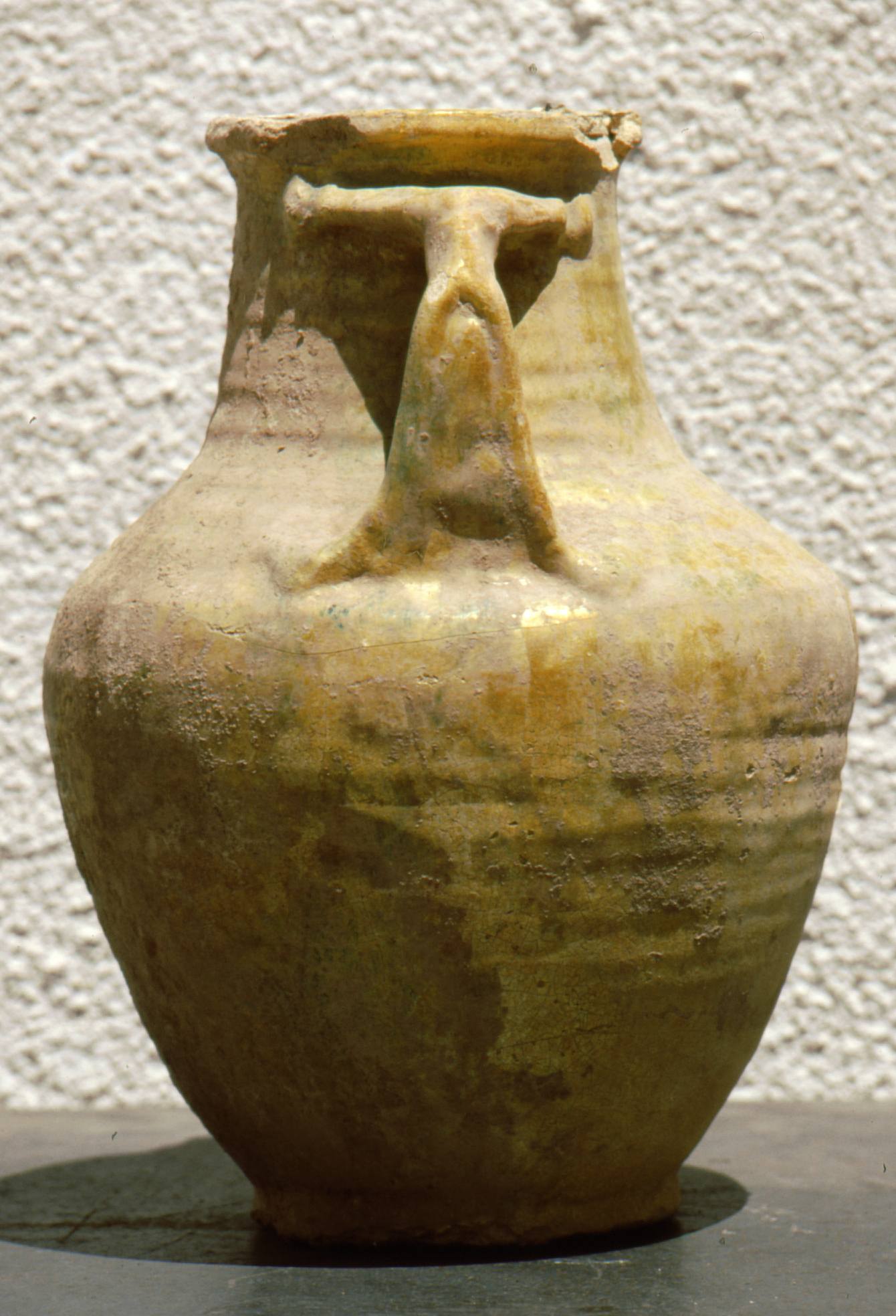
Storage jar with two handles and a gold-coloured glaze, excavated from grave Fu12 in ʿAmlāʾ/al-Fuwayda, attributable to the PIR.

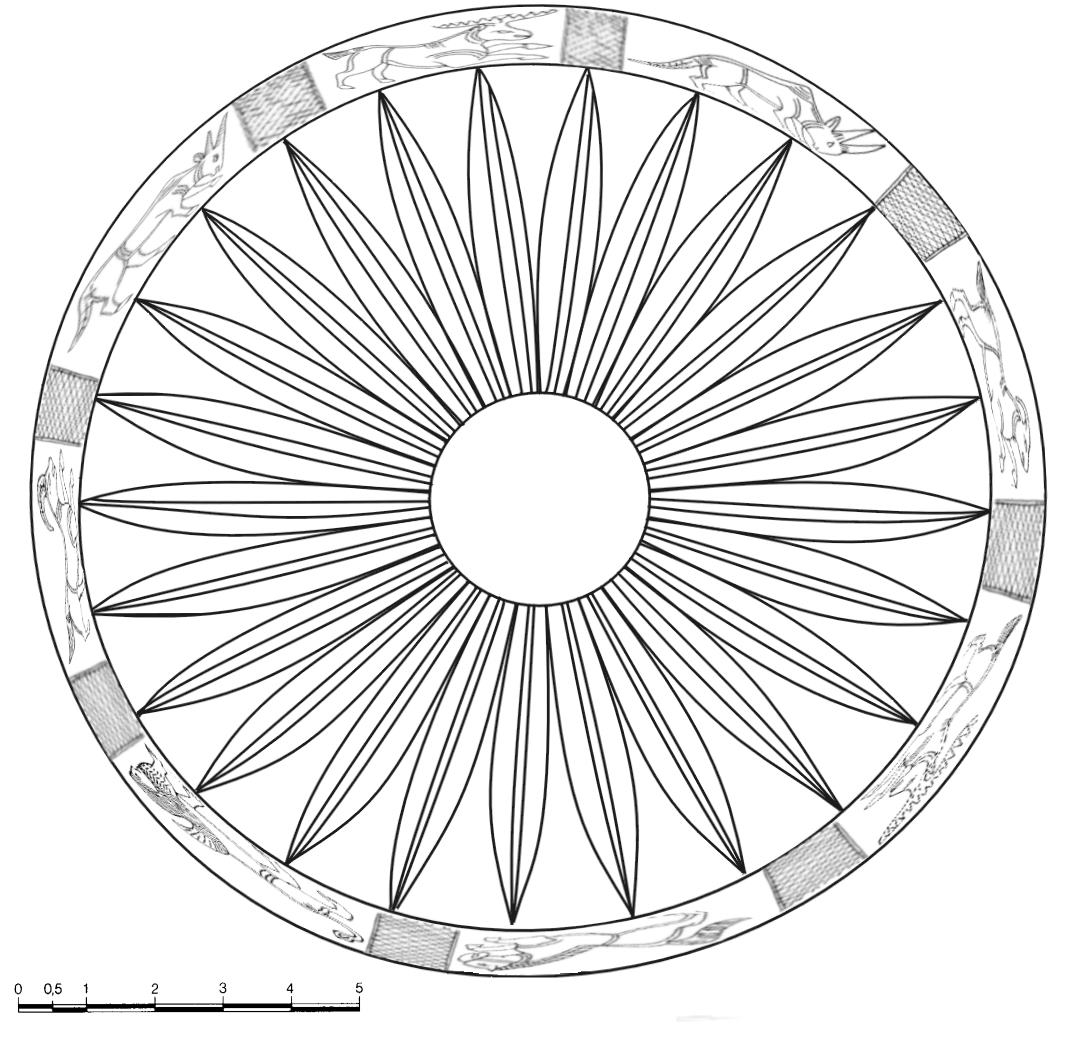
Drawing of a bronze bowl excavated from a late pre-Islamic cemetery in Amlah/al-Fuwaydah.
