= Rolf Hachmann =

German archaeologist (1917–2014)

- Born: 19 June 1917; Blankenese, German Empire
- Died: 5 June 2014 (aged 96); Saarbrücken, Germany

Academic background
- Education: University of Hamburg
- Thesis: Untersuchungen zur Eisenzeit in Mitteldeutschland (1949)
- Doctoral advisor: Hans Jürgen Eggers

Rolf Hachmann (19 June 1917 – 5 June 2014) was a German archaeologist who specialized in pre- and protohistory.

== Life ==
Hachmann was born in Blankenese, now part of Hamburg, Germany. He attended school at the Reformrealgymnasium in Blankenese, where he was instructed by Peter Zylmann, a Frisian prehistorian. He graduated there in 1937, receiving his Abitur. After work and military service and escape from imprisonment by English forces, in 1945 he began studies at the University of Hamburg, majoring in pre- and protohistory under Hans Jürgen Eggers with minor studies in classical antiquity, German medieval studies, folkloristics, ethnology and geography. After seven semesters in mid-1949 he received his doctoral degree with a thesis titled Untersuchungen zur Eisenzeit in Mitteldeutschland ('Investigations of the Iron Age in Central Germany'). From 1952 until 1953, he received a travel stipend from the German Archaeological Institute.

After habilitation in 1955, he was a Privatdozent for pre- and protohistory at the University of Hamburg. In 1959, he succeeded Vladimir Milojčić as professor of pre- and protohistory at Saarland University in Saarbrücken, where he directed the institute from 1959 until 1985. At his initiative, the institute was renamed the Institute for Pre- and Protohistory and Near Eastern Archaeology. He became a professor emeritus in 1986 and continued his scholarly work until his death in 2014.

== Work ==
He took part in various excavations in Turkey (Boğazkale) and Syria (Tell Chuera), and began work on the Tell Kamid al lawz in Lebanon in 1963 together with Arnulf Kuschke, professor for Old Testament studies at the University of Mainz. He directed this excavation from 1966 until 1981. In 1982, he initiated the excavations near the village of Drama in the Yambol Province of southeast Bulgaria together with Jan Lichardus and Alexander Fol, heading the efforts until his retirement.

His research covers a broad spectrum in both periods and geography. He authored important works on topics which included the Bronze Age in Central Europe and the archaeology and history of Germanic peoples. In 1962 together with Georg Kossack and philologist Hans Kuhn he published a study on the Nordwestblock (Völker zwischen Germanen und Kelten 'Peoples between Germanics and Celts').

In 1970, Hachmann published his study Die Goten und Skandinavien ('The Goths and Scandinavia'), which investigated the origins of the Goths and their presumed original homeland in Scandinavia. In this study, Hachmann concluded that it could neither be proven nor disproven that the Goths originated in Scandinavia. He nevertheless noted that the trail of human migration will not always be reflected in the archaeological record. Hachmann proposed that the Goths originated in the Przeworsk culture, but a later study by Herwig Wolfram has found this assumption to be incorrect.

Hachmann continued his work after becoming an emeritus professor at the university. In 1991, he published his studies on the origin and creation of the Gundestrup cauldron. The excavation results from Kamid al-Lawz were published in more than 20 volumes under his direction in the series Saarbrücker Beiträge zur Altertumskunde. Those whose doctorates he supervised include the former director of antiquities for the Saarland, Alfons Kolling, the mining archaeologist Gerd Weisgerber and François Bertemes, professor of prehistoric archaeology at Martin Luther University of Halle-Wittenberg.

Hachmann was a regular member of the German Archaeological Institute and was also an honorary member of the Romanian Academy from 1993. On June 30, 2007, the University of the Saarland held a colloquium on the occasion of his 90th birthday.

== Publications (selected) ==
- Die Goten und Skandinavien (= Quellen und Forschungen zur Sprach- und Kulturgeschichte der germanischen Völker. Vol. 158 = New Series Vol. 34, ISSN 0481-3596). de Gruyter, Berlin 1970.
- Die Germanen. Nagel, Munich 1971.
- as publisher: Ausgewählte Bibliographie zur Vorgeschichte von Mitteleuropa. Steiner-Verlag-Wiesbaden-GmbH, Stuttgart 1984, ISBN 3-515-04088-9.
- as publisher: Frühe Phöniker im Libanon. 20 Jahre deutsche Ausgrabungen in Kāmid el-Lōz. von Zabern, Mainz 1983, ISBN 3-8053-0771-3.
- as publisher: Studien zum Kulturbegriff in der Vor- und Frühgeschichtsforschung (= Saarbrücker Beiträge zur Altertumskunde. Vol. 48). Habelt, Bonn 1987, ISBN 3-7749-2263-2.
- Gundestrup-Studien. Untersuchungen zu den spätkeltischen Grundlagen der frühgermanischen Kunst. In: Bericht der Römisch-Germanischen Kommission. Vol. 71, 1991, ISSN 0341-9312, pp. 568–903.

== Bibliography ==
- Jan Filip: Enzyklopädisches Handbuch der Ur- und Frühgeschichte Europas. Volume 1: A – K. Academia - Verlag der Tschechoslowakischen Akademie, Prague 1966, p. 448.
- Hachmann, Rolf (1970). Die Goten und Skandinavien [The Goths and Scandinavia]. Walter de Gruyter. ISBN 3110842882.
- Georg Kossack: Rolf Hachmann zum 80. Geburtstag (19.6.1997). Prähistorische Zeitschrift 72, 1, 1997, p. 1–5.
- Liebeschuetz, J. H. W. F. (2015). East and West in Late Antiquity: Invasion, Settlement, Ethnogenesis and Conflicts of Religion. BRILL. ISBN 9789004289529.
- London, Jack (1917). The Human Drift. Macmillan Company.
- Wolfram, Herwig (1990). History of the Goths. Translated by Dunlap, Thomas J. University of California Press. ISBN 0520069838.
