= Qaryat al-Saih =

Archaeological site in Samaʾīl Wilayat Sharqiyah, Oman

Coordinates: 23°01′03″N 58°00′58″E

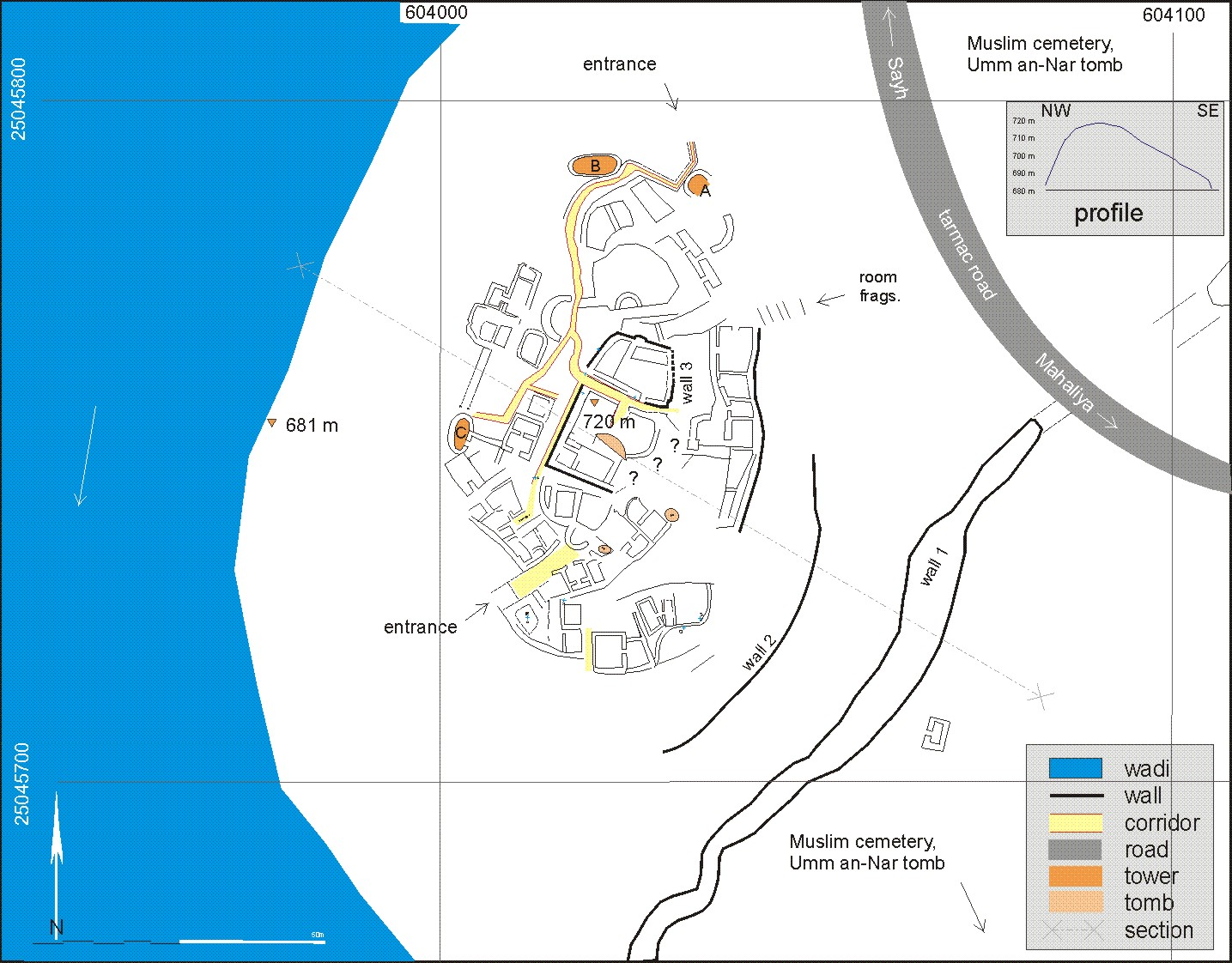
Sketch plan of the site

Qaryat al-Saiḥ (literally, village of the flowing) in Wadi Maḥram (23°01'N; 58°00'E, 712 m altitude) is an archaeological site in Samaʾīl Wilayat Sharqiyah, in Central Oman. This fortified village was inhabited in the Samad Late Iron Age and during the Islamic Ages.

== Overview ==
In the 1990s, Gerd Weisgerber first noticed this Samad Late Iron Age settlement yet gave no specifics about it: its exact location, size, site plan and dating were all unknown. Three antiquities signs stand to the east and north-east of the site near the road.

The preservation condition and recording methods used created the resulting sketch. The main structure measures some 50m x 90m, i.e. is c. 4000 metres squared in surface area. It lies as much as high as 50m above the surrounding wadi. 100m to the south-west lies a garden (Fig. 1), which supported the population in antiquity. The site is built adjacent to a low area. The west and south flanks are protected by the wadi and its steep slope (see the section in Fig. 1). Walls range up to 2m in height. Upslope, the houses have walls up to 80 cm in thickness. At key points, there are irregularly shaped towers which a thicker wall diameter. The gate construction is not preserved. It leads visitors into the village via its corridors. In the south-east the irregular second wall is preserved up to 1m in height. Further uphill, the heavier third wall encloses the core. In its midst lies a ruined Umm an-Nar tomb of some 7m diameter. A large wall (the first wall) thwarts the site from the mountain to the north-east to the wadi in the south-west. This has been seen in recent date. The building of the road and the water in the wadi transect this wall. It ranges from 60 cm to 2m in height.

Amid the rubble, rooms and walls are challenging to reconstruct. The preservation is variable. Entrances are difficult to recognise. Of the eleven Google Earth images, the one with the highest definition is the one taken on 24 December 2011. The white patches especially on the southern and south-eastern perimeter of wall are visible in the satellite image are rooms often of the casemate fortification. Walls are preserved maximally to 2m. Although the rooms appear to be ovoid, they are in fact rectangular. This results from the collapse of the superstructure into the corners. Characteristic are casemate walls. This is typical of the Samad LIA defensive architecture, as opposed to that of the preceding period.

The sketch shows fortification walls maximally 1.0m in thickness and corridors inside the fortification. There were many changes during the course of the building visible in the context. The building material was mainly unmortared stone. Abundant disintegrated mud brick and perhaps saruj wall fragments lie amid the stones. Samad LIA (50%) and Muslim Period glazed sgraffito pottery litter the site. South-west of the site (603830 m E, 2545442 m N, alt. 733m) a 30x30 m area shows small terrace-like structures which may be LIA graves, about 450m from the site.

== Sources ==
- Jürgen Schreiber, Transformationsprozesse in Oasensiedlungen Omans. Die vorislamische Zeit am Beispiel von Izki, Nizwa und dem Jebel Akhdar. Dissertation, Munich, 2007. URL http://edoc.ub.uni-muenchen.de/7548/1/Schreiber_Juergen.pdf
- Paul Yule, Die Gräberfelder in Samad al-Shan (Sultanat Oman): Materialien zu einer Kulturgeschichte (2001), ISBN 3-89646-634-8.
- Paul Yule, Cross-roads – Early and Late Iron Age South-eastern Arabia, Abhandlungen Deutsche Orient-Gesellschaft, vol. 30, Wiesbaden 2014, ISBN 978-3-447-10127-1
- Paul A. Yule, Valourising the Samad Late Iron Age, Arabian Archaeology and Epigraphy 27/1, 2016, 31‒71 ISSN 1600-0471.
