= Samet, Buriram =

Samet เสม็ด
- Subdistrict administrative organization
- Location in Thailand
- Coordinates: 14°59′39″N 103°06′08″E
- Country: Thailand
- Province: Buriram
- District: Mueang Buriram
- Tambon: Tambon Samet
- Founded: ?
- Incorporated (tambon): 1996

Government
  - Type: Local government
  - Mayor: Nij Kaewsisai
- Elevation: 535 ft (163 m)
- Time zone: UTC+7 (Thailand Standard Time)
- Postal code: 31000
- Area code: 044
- Website: www.tambonsamed.go.th

Samet (Thai: เสม็ด, pronounced [sā.mèt]) is a subdistrict administrative organization (TAO) in Thailand, about 413 km north-east of Bangkok. The local government covers the whole tambon Samet in the Mueang Buriram district.

== See also ==
- Buriram
- Buriram Province
- Amphoe Mueang Buriram
- Khao Kradong Forest Park
