= ʿUqdat al-Bakrah =

Archaeological site in Wadi Ḍank, Ad Dhahirah, Oman

Coordinates: 23°19′11″N 55°51′03″E

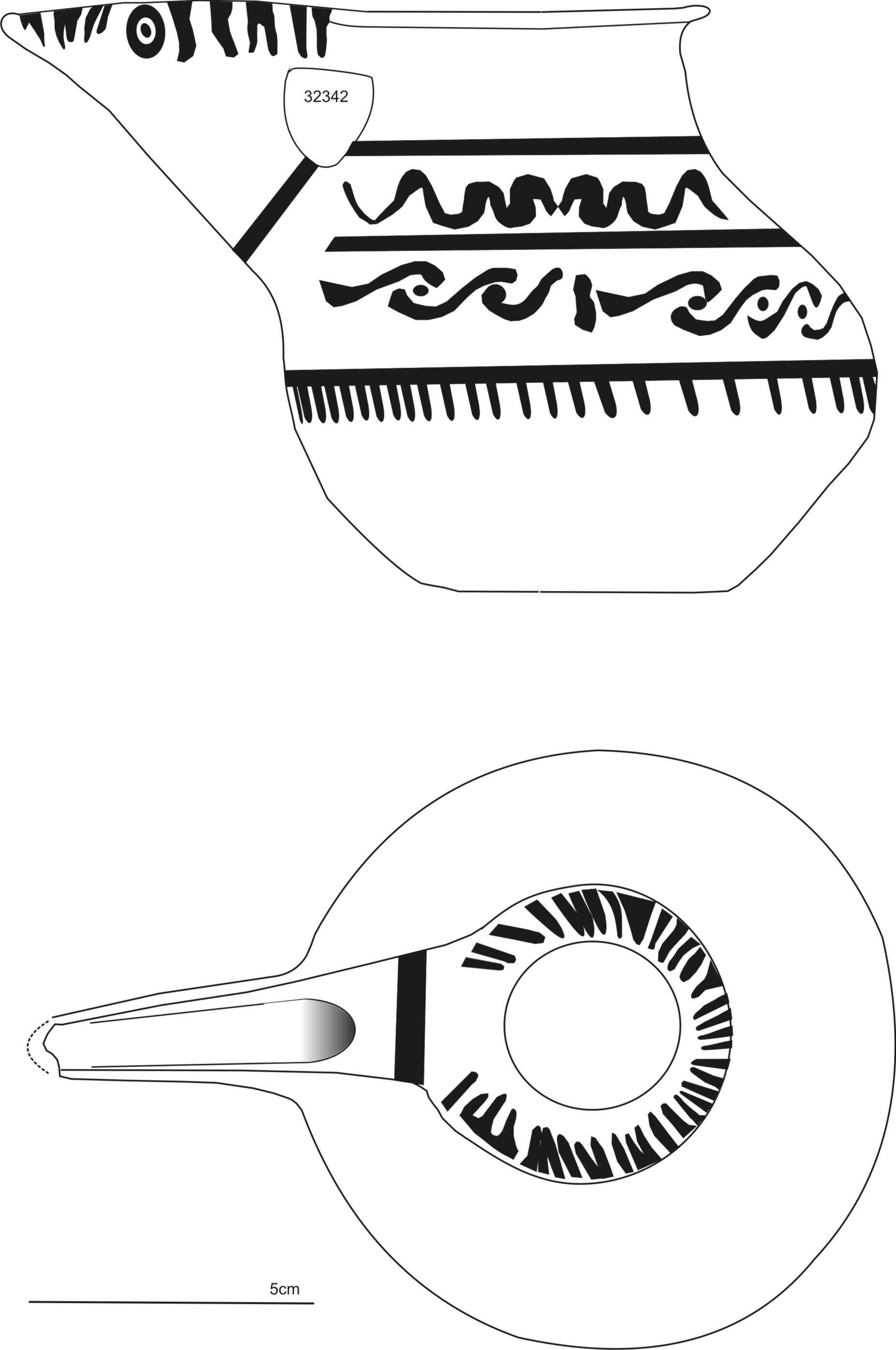
Early Iron Age bridge-spouted jar excavated from the site of ʿUqdat al-Bakrah, Sultanate of Oman.

ʿUqdat al-Bakrah (Arabic: عقدة البكرة, lit. 'knot of the young she-camel'), also known incorrectly as Al-Saffah, is an archaeological site in Wadi Ḍank, in the Ad Dhahirah Governorate of northwestern Oman. It is a metal-working site dating to the Early Iron Age.

== See also ==
- Archaeology of Oman
