= Al-Amqat =

Coordinates: 23°26′42″N 58°07′50″E

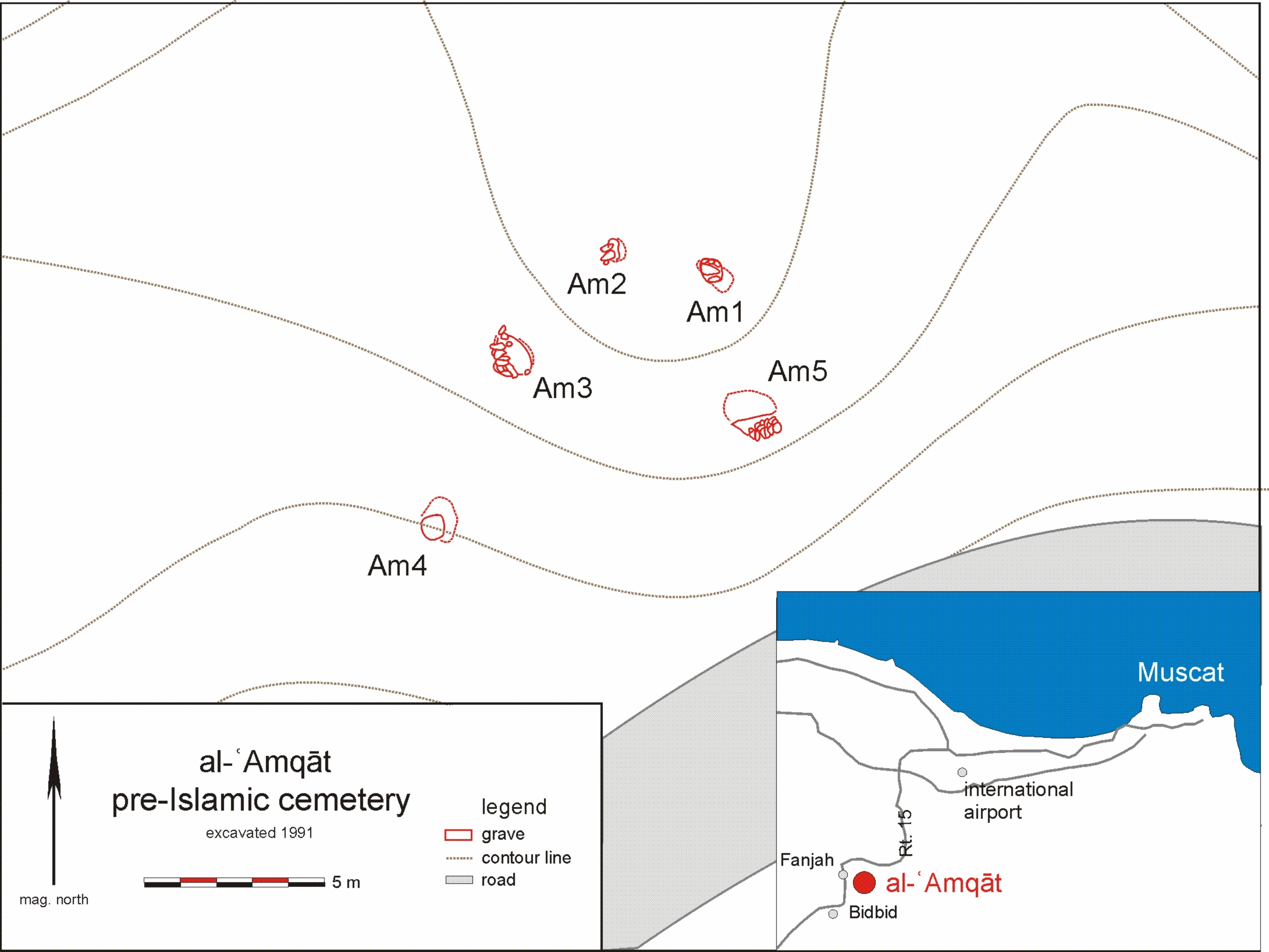
plan of the archaeological site al-Amqat in the Sultanate of Oman.

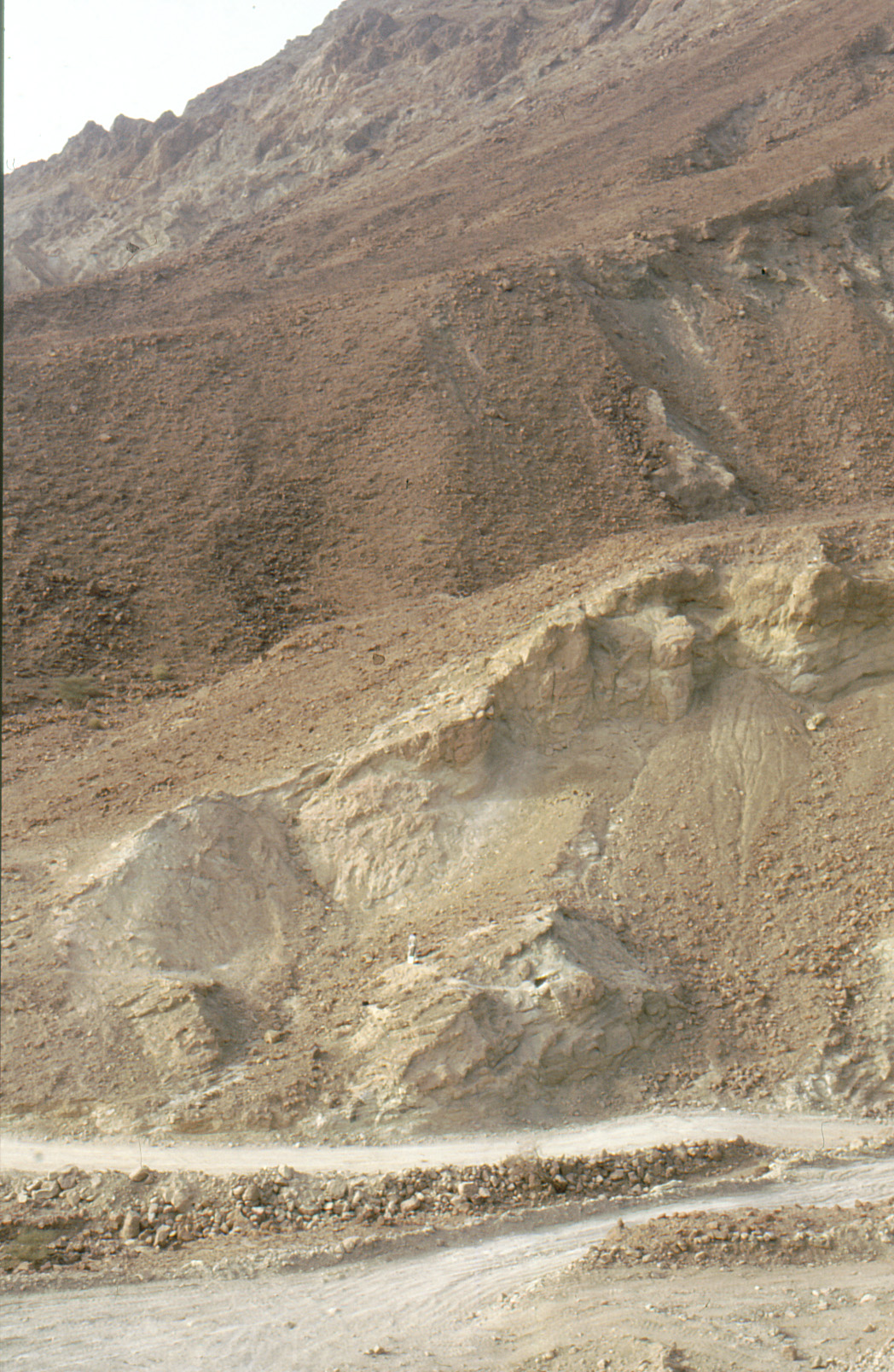
the Late Iron Age cemetery north of the oasis of al-Amqat, Sultanate of Oman, 1991.

Al-Amqat is an archaeological site in al-Dakhaliyah, Oman. Located on a slope to the north of the oasis, the cemetery dates to the Samad Late Iron Age.

== Description ==
The site was discovered in 1991, during road-building operations. German archaeologists Paul Yule, Gerd and Angelica Weisgerber and Manfred Kunter conducted a rescue excavation in response.

The preservation of the graves was excellent and they were not robbed. Five graves were salvaged. Particularly interesting was the intact grave of a warrior and another of a woman with numerous beads. A few years thereafter the cemetery was largely destroyed by road builders.

== See also ==
- Archaeology of Oman
