= Donald Brian Doe =

British archaeologist and architect

Donald Brian Doe MBE FRIBA FSA (19 June 1920 – 5 May 2005) was a British archaeologist and architect. Originally trained as an architect, Doe acquired an interest in archaeology whilst serving with the Royal Engineers in North Africa in the Second World War. After the war, he was appointed the Chief Government Architect of the British Colony of Aden (part of modern-day Yemen), and later served as the first Director of its Department of Antiquities. Upon the British withdrawal from Yemen in 1967, he enrolled at the University of Cambridge, where he worked on publishing the results of his studies of the archaeology and architectural history of Southern Arabia. He also conducted archaeological surveys in Oman in the 1970s.
