= Samet (name) =

Samet is both a surname and a given name. The name is German and Jewish (Ashkenazic): metonymic occupational name for a maker or seller of velvet, from Yiddish samet 'velvet' (German Samt, ultimately from Greek hexamiton, a compound of hex 'six' + mitos 'thread').

Notable people with the name include:

== Given name ==
- Samet Ağaoğlu (1909–1982), Turkish politician
- Samet Ak (born 2001), Turkish archer
- Samet Akaydın (born 1994), Turkish football player
- Samet Ashimov (born 1979), Bulgarian football player
- Samet Aybaba (born 1955), Turkish football player
- Samet Bülbül (born 1991), Turkish football player
- Samet Bulut (born 1996), Dutch football player
- Samet Geyik (born 1987), Turkish basketball player
- Samet Gündüz (born 1987), Swiss football player
- Samet Hasan Yıldıran (born 1992), Turkish football player

== Middle name ==
- Faik Samet Güneş (born 1993), Turkish volleyball player.

== Surname ==
- Elizabeth Samet (born 1969), American author
- Hanan Samet, computer scientist
- Jonathan Samet (born 1946), physician and epidemiologist
- Judah Samet (1938–2022), American businessman
- Kayna Samet (born 1980), French singer
- Zevi Samet (born 2003), American college basketball player
