= Samad =

- Gender: Male

Origin
- Origin: Arabic
- Region of origin: Middle East

Other names
- Related names: Samet

Samad or Samed (Arabic: صمد, Ṣamad) is an Arabic male given name.

== Given name ==
- Abd al-Samad ibn Ali, Abbasid governor of Jazira in 780s.
- Samed Abdul Awudu (born 1984), Ghanaian football player
- Samad Nikkhah Bahrami (born 1983), Iranian basketball player
- Samad Behrangi (1939–1967), Iranian teacher, folklorist and writer
- Samad Marfavi (born 1965), Iranian football player
- Samad bey Mehmandarov (1855–1931), Azerbaijani-Russian general
- Samad Rustamov, Uzbek Sambo player
- Samad Khan Momtaz os-Saltaneh (1869–1955), Iranian diplomat
- Samad Shohzukhurov (born 1990), Tajik football player
- Samad Taylor (born 1998), American baseball player
- Samad Vurgun (1906–1956), Azerbaijani-Soviet poet
- Samed Yeşil (born 1994), Turkish-German football player

== Middle name ==
- Abdul Samad Ismail (1924–2008), Malaysian journalist
- Abdul Samad Rabiu (born 1960), Nigerian businessman
- Abdul Samad of Selangor (1804–1898), Sultan of Selangor
- Abdul Samad Abdulla (1946–2013), Maldivian foreign affairs minister

== Surname ==
- Abdul Basit 'Abd us-Samad (1927–1988), Egyptian Quran reciter
- Abdus Samad Azad (1922–2005), Bangladeshi diplomat and politician
- Hamed Abdel-Samad (born 1972), German-Egyptian writer
- Mohammad Samad (born 2000), Indian actor
- Mohammad Ridzwan bin Samad, a convicted rioter and gang member of Salakau in Singapore
- Nabil Samad (born 1986), Bangladeshi cricketer
- Omar Samad, Afghan diplomat
- Sahal Abdul Samad (born 1997), Indian football player
- Saleh Ali al-Sammad (1979–2018), Yemeni politician
  - Samad (UAV), an Iranian suicide drone named after Saleh Ali al-Sammad
- Ziad Al-Samad (born 1978), Lebanese football player

== In fiction ==
- Samad (fictional character), played by Iranian actor Parviz Sayyad
- Samad Iqbal, a main character in the novel White Teeth by Zadie Smith
