= Gerd Weisgerber =

Gerd Weisgerber (January 24, 1938 in Saarwellingen – June 22, 2010 in Recklinghausen) was an eminent German professor of mining archaeology. He was one of the first mining archaeologists of the world, who set standards in this scientific discipline. As a scientist from the German Mining Museum, he focused his research mainly on Western Asia, especially on Oman, Jordan, Palestine, and Iran.

== Education and career ==
From 1957 to 1959, Gerd Weisgerber studied at the teacher training college of Saarbrücken and began his career as a secondary school teacher. Later on, he found a passion on archaeology and finished his doctorate in 1970 at Saarland University over "Römische Quellheiligtum von Hochscheid im Hunsrück". He started his archaeological career as professor Rolf Hachmann's assistant at the same university. In April 1973 he started his work at the German Mining Museum as a mining archaeologist, where he was active until the very end of his life. Since 1984 he was the assistant director of the museum.

== Works ==
- Beobachtungen zum alten Kupferbergbau im Sultanat Oman, in: Der Anschnitt 29, H. 5–6, 1977, 190–211.
- A New Kind of Copper Slag from Tawi 'Arja, Oman, in: Journal of the Historical Metallurgy Society 12/1, 1978, 40–43.
- Evidence of Ancient Mining Sites in Oman: a Preliminary Report, in: The Journal of Oman Studies 4, 1978, 15–28.
- Muscat in 1688: Engelbert Kaempferls Report and Engravings, in: The Journal of Oman Studies 5, 1979 (1982), 95–100.
- Das römische Wasserheberad ais Rio Tinto in Spanien im British Museum London, Der Anschnitt, 1979, 62–79.
- " ... und Kupfer in Oman" - Das Oman-Projekt des Deutschen Bergbau-Museums, in: Der Anschnitt 32, H. 2–3, 1980, 62–110.
- Patterns of Early Islamic Metallurgy in Oman, in: Proc. of the Seminar for Arabian Studies 10, 1980, 115–126.
- Archäologische und archäometallurgische Untersuchungen in Oman, in: Allgemeine und Vergleichende Archäologie - Beiträge 2, 1980, 67–90.
- GW/Hauptmann, Andreas: Third Millennium BC. Copper Production in Oman, in: Revue d'Arch6ometrie 3, 1980, 131–138
- Mehr als Kupfer in Oman - Ergebnisse der Expedition 1981, in: Der Anschnitt 33, H. 5–6, 1981, 174–263
- Makan and Meluhha - Third Millennium BC Copper Production in: Oman and the Evidence of Contact with the Indus Valley, in: Proc. of the 6th International Conference of the Association of South Asian Archaeologists in Western Europe, South Asian Archaeology 1981, 196–201
- Istiflal al-nahas fi Uman fi 1-alf al-talit qabl al-milad, Hasad 7, 1400 H./1980 AD., 181–227, Nadwat al-dirasat al-unaniyya (Kairo 1981)
- Aspects of Late Iron Age Archaeology in Oman: The Samad-Civilization, in: Proc. of the Seminar of Arabian Studies 12, 1982, 81–94
- Kupferbergbau schon vor 4000 Jahren, in: WBK-Journal 4, 1982, 8
- Copper Production during the Third Millennium BC in Oman and the Question of Makan, in: The Journal of Oman Studies 6/2, 1983, 269–276
- GW/Roden, Christoph: Römische Schmiedeszenen und ihre Gebläse, Der Anschnitt 37, 1985, 2-21.
- GW/Yule, Paul: The First Metal Hoard in Oman, in: South Asian Archaeology, 1985, 60 f., ISBN 0913215503
- Griechische Metallhandwerker und ihre Gebläse, Der Anschnitt, 1986, 2-26.
- GW/al-Shanfari, Ali A. B.: Nineteenth Century British Lead Pigs in Oman, in: Journal of the Historical Metallurgy Society 20/1, 1986, 46–48
- Archaeological Evidence of Copper Exploitation at 'Arja, in: The Journal of Oman Studies 9, 1987, 145–172
- Hauptmann, Andreas/GW/Bachmann, Hans-Gert: Early Copper Metallurgy in Oman, in: BUMA (R. Madding, ed.), 1988, 34–51
- Oman: A Bronze-producing Centre during the 1st Half of the 1st Millennium BC, in: Bronze-working Centres of Western Asia c. 1000539 B.C. (J. Curtis, ed.), 1988, 285–295
- Yule, Paul, GW: Tales from Mazoon, in: PDO News, No. 2, 1989, 9-13 (englisch); 913 (arabisch), no ISBN
- Al-Shanfari, Ali Bakhit/GW: A Late Bronze Age Warrior Burial from Nizwa (Oman), in: Oman Studies, 17–30. Rome 1989 (= Serie Orientale Roma 63)
- A Gift from Bismarck to the Sultan of Zanzibar, in: Journal of Oman Studies, 10, 1989, 61–67
- Altägyptischer Hornsteinbergbau im Wadi el-Sheikh, Der Anschnitt, 1989, 186–210.
- Montanarchäeologie, Archäeometallurgie der Alten Welt (Old World Archaeometallurgy), Der Anschnitt, Beiheft 7. 1989, 79–98.
- Yule, Paul/GW: Samad Ash Shan, Sultanate of Oman, 1989, in: Proceedings of the Seminar for Arabian Studies 20, 1990, 141–144, ISSN 0308-8421
- Montanarchäeologische Forschungen in Nordwest-Iran 1978, Archäeologische Mitteilungen aus Iran, Band 23, 1990, 73–84.
- GW/ Kroll, Stephan, Gropp, Gerd, Hauptmann, Andreas, Das Bergbaurevier von Sungun bei Kighal in Azarbaidjan (Iran), Archäeologische Mitteilungen aus Iran, Band 23, 1990, 85–103.
- Bergbau im Alten Ägypten, Das Altertum 37. Heft 3. 1991, 140–154.
- Archäologisches Fundgut des 2. Jahrtausends v.Chr. in Oman Möglichkeiten zur chronologischen Gliederung, in: K. Schippmann/A. Herling/J.-F. Salles (eds.), Golf-Archäologie (= Internationale Archäologie 6), Buch am Erlbach 1991, 321–330, ISBN 3-924734-24-0
- GW/Yule, Paul: Excavation on the Late Iron Age cemeteries in the Wadi Samad, Sultanate of Oman, 1987, in: ebd., 331–335
- Die Suche nach dem altsumerischen Kupferland Makan, in: Das Altertum 37, H. 2, 1991, 76–90
- Slag heap search for Magan, in: PDO News, 2, 1992, 16–23; dgl. in arabisch, 16–23
- GW/ Seifert, Martina: Mittelalterliche Schmiede und ihre Gebläse, Der Anschnitt 44, 1992, 1–17.
- Dokumentation montanarchäologischer Plätze am Beispiel von Hara Kilab in Oman - Probleme und Lösungsansätze, in: Studies in Oriental Culture and History, ed. Andreas Gingrich/Sylvia Haas/Gabriele Paleczek/Thomas Fillitz (Festschrift Walter Dostal), Frankfurt/Berlin/New York/Paris/Wien 1993, 49–67
- Yule, Paul/GW: Die 14. Deutsche Archäologische Oman-Expedition 1995, in: Mitteilungen der Deutschen Orient-Gesellschaft zu Berlin, 128, Berlin 1996, 135–155, ISSN 0342-118X
- GW/ Pernicka, Ernst: Ore mining in prehistoric Europe: An overview, in G. Morteani and J. Northover (eds.), Prehistoric Gold in Europe, 1995, 159–182.
- Magan's Copper, in: PDO News, 1, 1997, 7–11; dgl. in arabisch, 7–11
- A new type of flint exploitation in Oman (Arabia), in: Schild, Romuald/Sulgostowska, Zofia (eds.): Man and flint. Proceedings of the VIIth International Flint Symposium, Warzawa-Ostrowiec Swietokrzyski. September 1995, Warzawa 1997, 153–157
- Speleology and archaeology of mining-a comparison, Proceedings of the 12th International Congress of Speleology, 1997, Switzerland, Volume 6. 1997, 96–98.
- P. Yule–G. Weisgerber, The Metal Hoard from ʿIbrī/Selme, Sultanate of Oman. Präh. Bronzefunde XX.7, Stuttgart 2001, ISBN 3-515-07153-9

Zur Geschichte der Bergbauarchäeologie, Nachrichten aus Niedersachsen Urgeschichte 66, 1997, 7–19.

- GW/ Cierny, Jan: Tin for Ancient Anatolia? Dr Anschnitt, Beiheft 15, Anatolian Metal II, 2002, 179–186.
- Boroffka, Nikolaus, Cierny, Jan, Lutz Joachim, Parzinger, Hermann, Pernicka, Ernst, Weisgerber, Gerd, 2002, Bronze Age tin from central Asia: Preliminary Notes, in Katie Boyle, Colin Renfrew, Marsha Levine (eds.) Ancient interactions: east and west in Eurasia, 135–159.
- The impact of the dynamics of qanats and aflaj on oases in Oman: Comparison with Iran and Bahrain, Internationales Frontinus-Symposium: Wasserversorgung aus Qanaten-Qanate als Vorbilder im Tunnelbau, 2.-5. Oktober 2003, Luxemburg, Heft 26, 2003, 61–97.
- Cierny, Jan/GW: Bronze Age tin mines in central Asia, in Alessandra Giumlia-Mair and Fulvia Lo Schiavo (eds.) The problem of early tin, BAR International Series, 2003, 23–31.
- Stöllner, Thomas, Weisgerber, Gerd, Momenzadeh, Morteza, Pernicka, Ernst, Shirazi, Shahrzad, 2004, Die Blei-/Silbergruben von Nakhlak und ihre Bedeutung im Altertum, Der Anschnit 56, 76–96.
- Prähistorischer Zinnbergbau in Mittelasien, Tüba-Ar, Turkish Academy of Sciences, Journal of Archaeology, 2010, 237–258.
- Yule, Paul (2011). "In memoriam Dr Gerd Weisgerber" (PDF). Proceedings of the Seminar for Arabian Studies. 41: 1–2., ISSN 0308-8421
