= German Mining Museum =

Museum in Germany

German Mining Museum (Deutsches Bergbau-Museum Bochum)
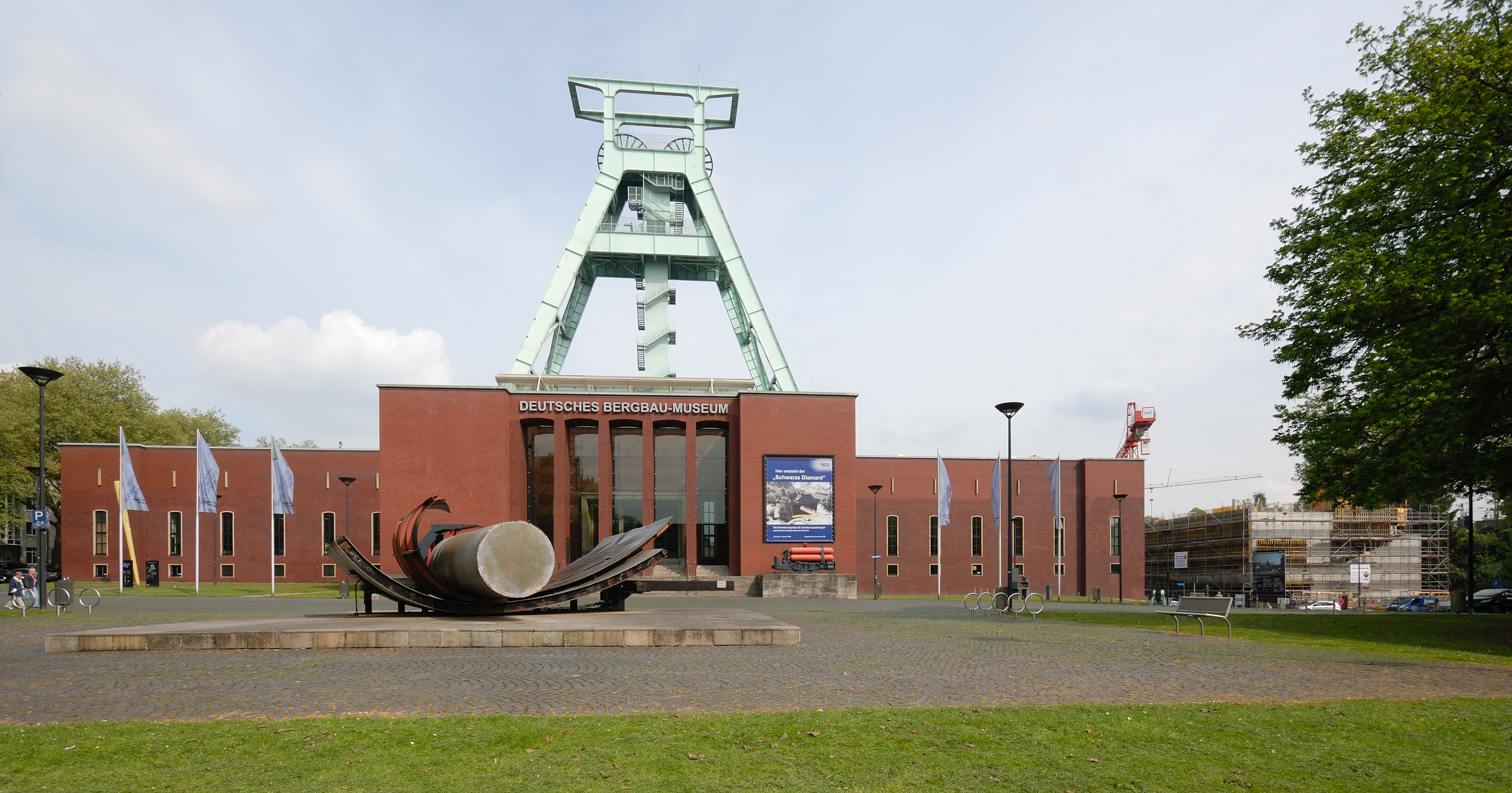
- The German Mining Museum in Bochum
- Established: 1930
- Location: Am Bergbaumuseum 28, 44791 Bochum, North Rhine-Westphalia
- Coordinates: 51°29′21″N 7°13′2″E
- Type: Museum, research establishment Humanities, Natural Sciences, History, Engineering
- Accreditation: Leibniz-Gemeinschaft
- Curator: Prof. Dr. Sunhild Kleingärtner
- Owners: DMT-Gesellschaft für Lehre und Bildung mbH, and the city of Bochum
- Employees: ca. 140
- Website: www.BergbauMuseum.de

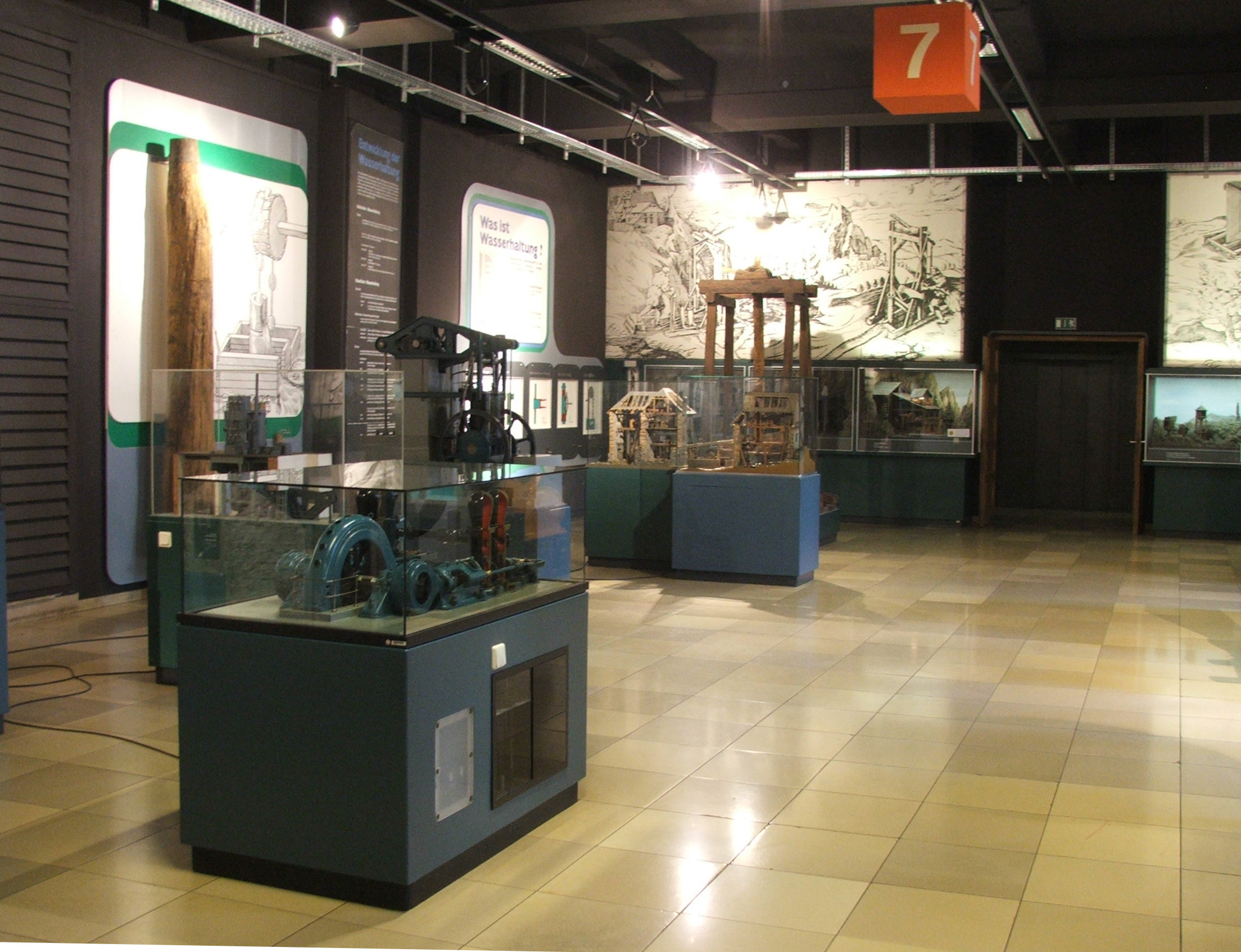

The German Mining Museum in Bochum (German: Deutsches Bergbau-Museum Bochum) or DBM is one of the most visited museums in Germany with around 365,700 visitors per year (2012). It is the largest mining museum in the world, and a renowned research establishment for mining history.

Above-ground exhibitions, and a faithfully reconstructed show mine below the museum terrain give visitors insights into the world of mining. The main areas of research by the scientists are the History and Technology of Mining (Geschichte und Technik des Montanwesens), and the Documentation and Conservation of Cultural Artefacts (Dokumentation und Schutz von Kulturgut). As a research institute, the museum is a member of the Gottfried Wilhelm Leibniz Scientific Community.

== Literature ==
- Olaf Hartung: Museen des Industrialismus: Formen bürgerlicher Geschichtskultur am Beispiel des Bayerischen Verkehrsmuseums und des Deutschen Bergbaumuseums. Cologne [et al.] 2007 (Beiträge zur Geschichtskultur; Bd. 32), Also: Kiel, Univ., Diss., 2007, ISBN 978-3-412-13506-5.
- Rainer Slotta (ed.): 75 Jahre Deutsches Bergbau-Museum Bochum (1930 bis 2005). Vom Wachsen und Werden eines Museums. 2 vols., Bochum, 2005, ISBN 3-937203-15-X
- Evelyn Kroker: Das Bergbau-Archiv Bochum und seine Bestände. Bochum, 2001.

== See also ==
- History of the Ruhr
