= Tiwi, Oman =

Archaeological site in Oman

Coordinates: 22°49′15″N 59°15′34″E

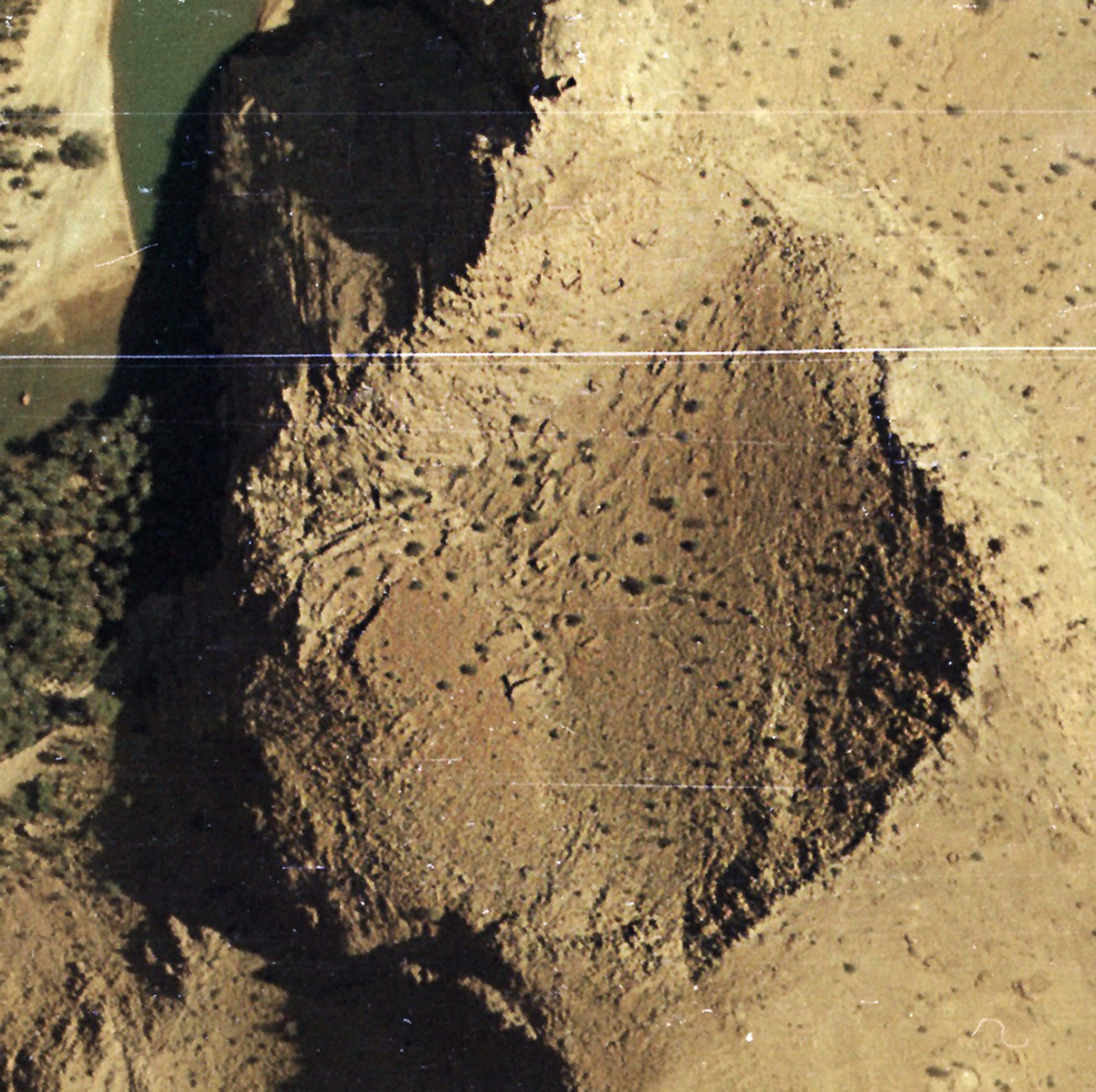
The site Tiwi T2 made in 1981 prior to the building of the motorway. Up is north.

Ṭīwī (Arabic: طيوي) is a town in Oman. It is known for an archaeological site in the area known as al-Jurayf, in Ṣūr Wilayat Sharqiyah. The town and the site are located between Wadi Shab and Wadi Tiwi on the Gulf of Oman.

== Archaeological site ==
This fortified village was inhabited in the Samad Late Iron Age and during Islamic times. It is known as Tiwi site TW2 (22°49'14.38"N, 59°15'34.00"E, 75 m altitude).

The archaeological site lies inside the cusp of a mountain and contains surface finds attributable to the Samad Late Iron Age It lies 700 m west of the coast. Hidden behind the easternmost cusp of a volcanic wall, this settlement is little visible from the sea or the nearby coastal road. It was mapped and surveyed in 2002.

To the north-west, north and east of the settlement extensive Late Iron Age settlements occurred. The preservation condition and our recording methods condition the appearance of the resulting sketch. It was re-mapped in 2014. The site seems to have been in sporadic use into the recent period. Shortly after investigation the site was badly bull-dozed in order to build the coastal motorway and to develop the area commercially.

== See also ==
- Archaeology of Oman
- Samad al-Shan

== Sources ==
- Jürgen Schreiber, Transformationsprozesse in Oasensiedlungen Omans. Die vorislamische Zeit am Beispiel von Izki, Nizwa und dem Jebel Akhdar. Dissertation, Munich, 2007. URL http://edoc.ub.uni-muenchen.de/7548/1/Schreiber_Juergen.pdf
- Paul Yule, Die Gräberfelder in Samad al-Shan (Sultanat Oman): Materialien zu einer Kulturgeschichte (Rahden 2001), ISBN 3-89646-634-8.
- Paul Yule, Cross-roads – Early and Late Iron Age South-eastern Arabia, Abhandlungen Deutsche Orient-Gesellschaft, vol. 30, Wiesbaden 2014, ISBN 978-3-447-10127-1
- Paul Yule, Valourising the Samad Late Iron Age, Arabian Archaeology and Epigraphy 27/1, 2016, 31‒71, ISSN 0905-7196.
