= Al-Khawdh =

Archaeological site of Oman

Coordinates: 25°35′30″N 58°10′46″E

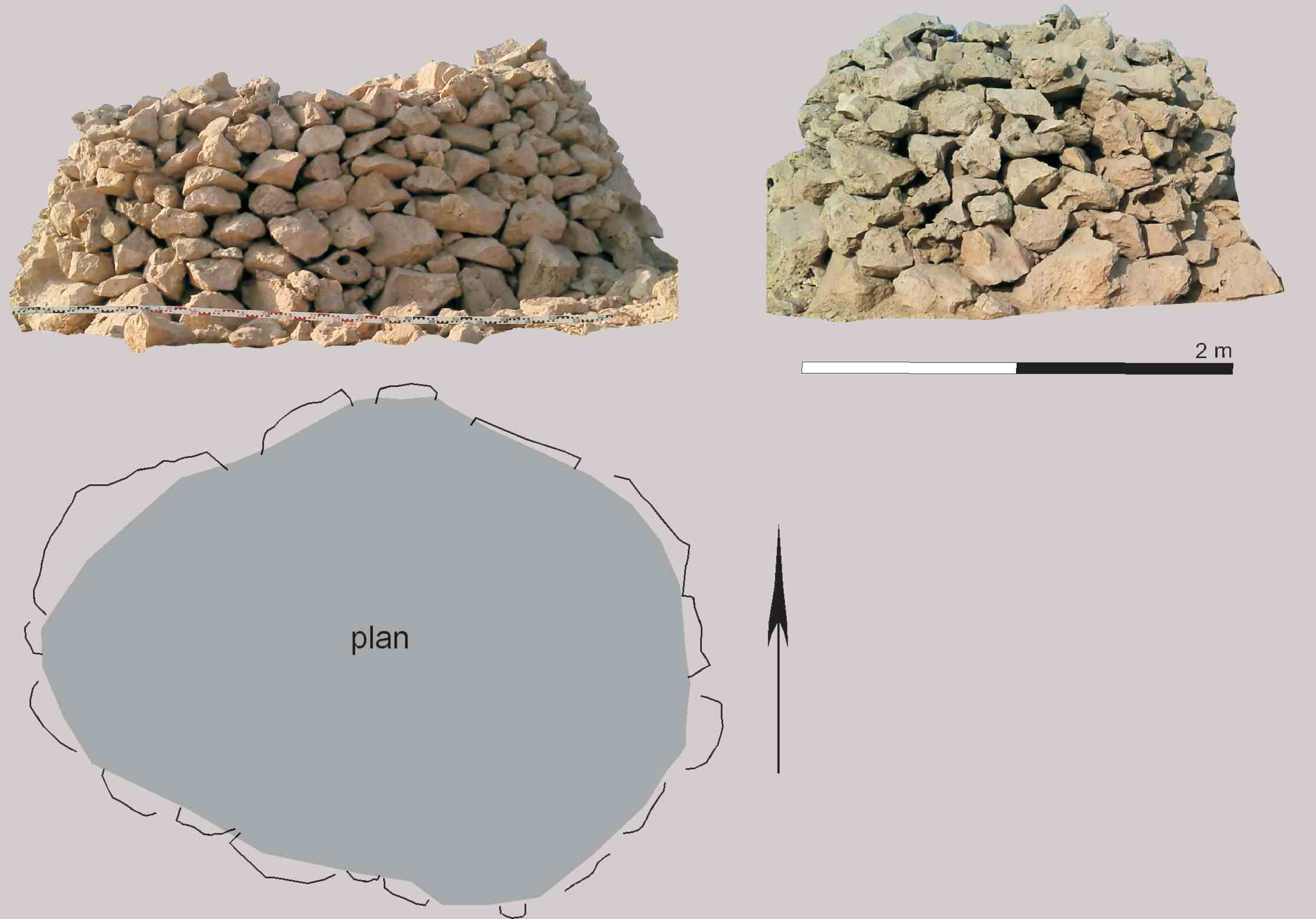
This hut tomb dates to the Early Iron Age in south-eastern Arabia

Al-Khawdh (الخوض) (25°35'N; 58°10'E, altitude 40–50 m) contains several archaeological sites and lies in the Muscat Governorate, Oman, where Early Iron Age and Late Iron Age sites have been under study in recent years.

Major finds include a large cemetery of the Early Iron Age i.e. the Lizq-Rumaylah period. and a hoard of over 300 implements made of copper alloy This cemetery lies 2.5 kilometres (1.6 mi) south-east of the hoard site.

== See also ==
- Archaeology of Oman
- Oman
- Pre-Islamic recent period
- List of archaeological sites by country

== Sources ==
- Paul Yule, Cross-roads – Early and Late Iron Age South-eastern Arabia, Abhandlungen Deutsche Orient-Gesellschaft, vol. 30, Wiesbaden, 2014, ISBN 978-3-447-10127-1; E-Book: ISBN 978-3-447-19287-3.
