= Jebel al-Salayli (archaeological site) =

Coordinates: 22°55′47″N 58°17′11″E

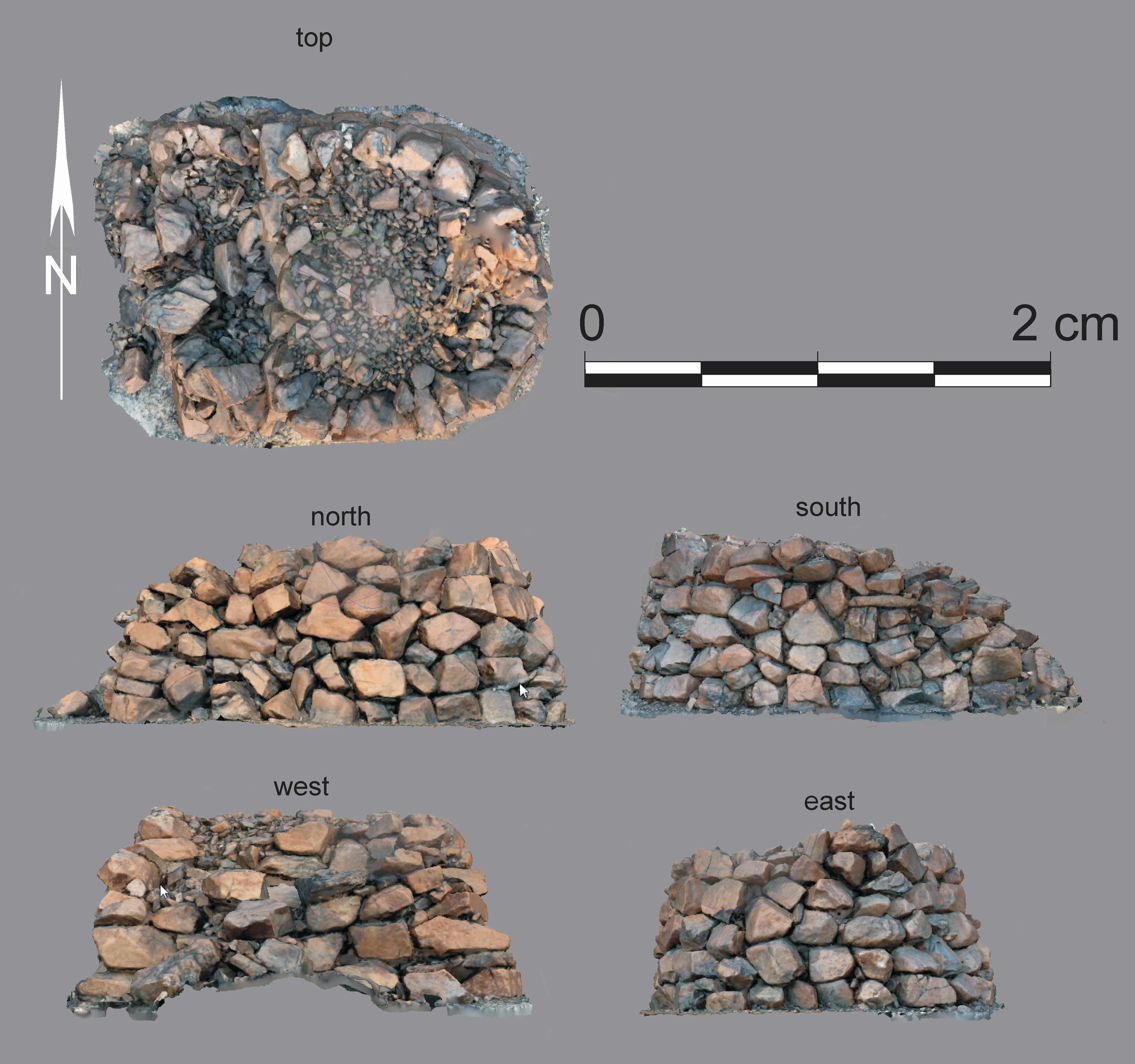

Jebel al-Salayli (Ǧebel al-Ṣalāylī, الصايلي), (22°55'46.64"N, 58°17'10.80"E, alt. 704 m) is an archaeological site in the Northern Sharqiyah province of the Sultanate of Oman, where a large number of Early Iron Age so-called hut tombs found first public mention. The first citation mistakenly refers to this site as 'Musfa', a site which actually lies a few kilometres to the north. The Jebel is the adjacent mountain to the immediate north. The al-Salayli site (also termed al-Wuqbah or al-Wuqayb) attracted the attention of archaeologists because of an abandoned copper mine, extensive slag fields, ruined settlements and numerous Early Iron Age tombs. Nestled between the mountains, this site is still relatively well preserved. The settlement ruins date to the Early Iron Age and the Muslim Period. At the lower end of a wadi, the hut tombs, designated stie 1, lie 400 m west of an abandoned copper mine, to which they probably originally owed their existence.

== See also ==
- Archaeology of Oman
- List of archaeological sites by country
- Pre-Islamic recent period

== Sources ==
- G. Goettler, N. Firth, C. Huston, A preliminary discussion of ancient mining in the Sultanate of Oman, Journal of Oman studies 2, 1976: 54 plate 10, prospection site 45, ISSN 0378-8180.
- Paul Yule, Die Gräberfelder in Samad al-Shan (Sultanat Oman): Materialien zu einer Kulturgeschichte, Rahden, 2001, ISBN 3-89646-634-8..
- Paul Yule, Cross-roads – Early and Late Iron Age South-eastern Arabia, Abhandlungen Deutsche Orient-Gesellschaft, vol. 30, Wiesbaden, 2014, ISBN 978-3-447-10127-1; E-Book: ISBN 978-3-447-19287-3.
- Paul Yule, Michela Gaudiello, Photogrammetric recording of an Early Iron Age hut tomb in central Oman, Kermes, 107, 2017 (appeared 2018), 50–4; ISSN 1122-3197.
