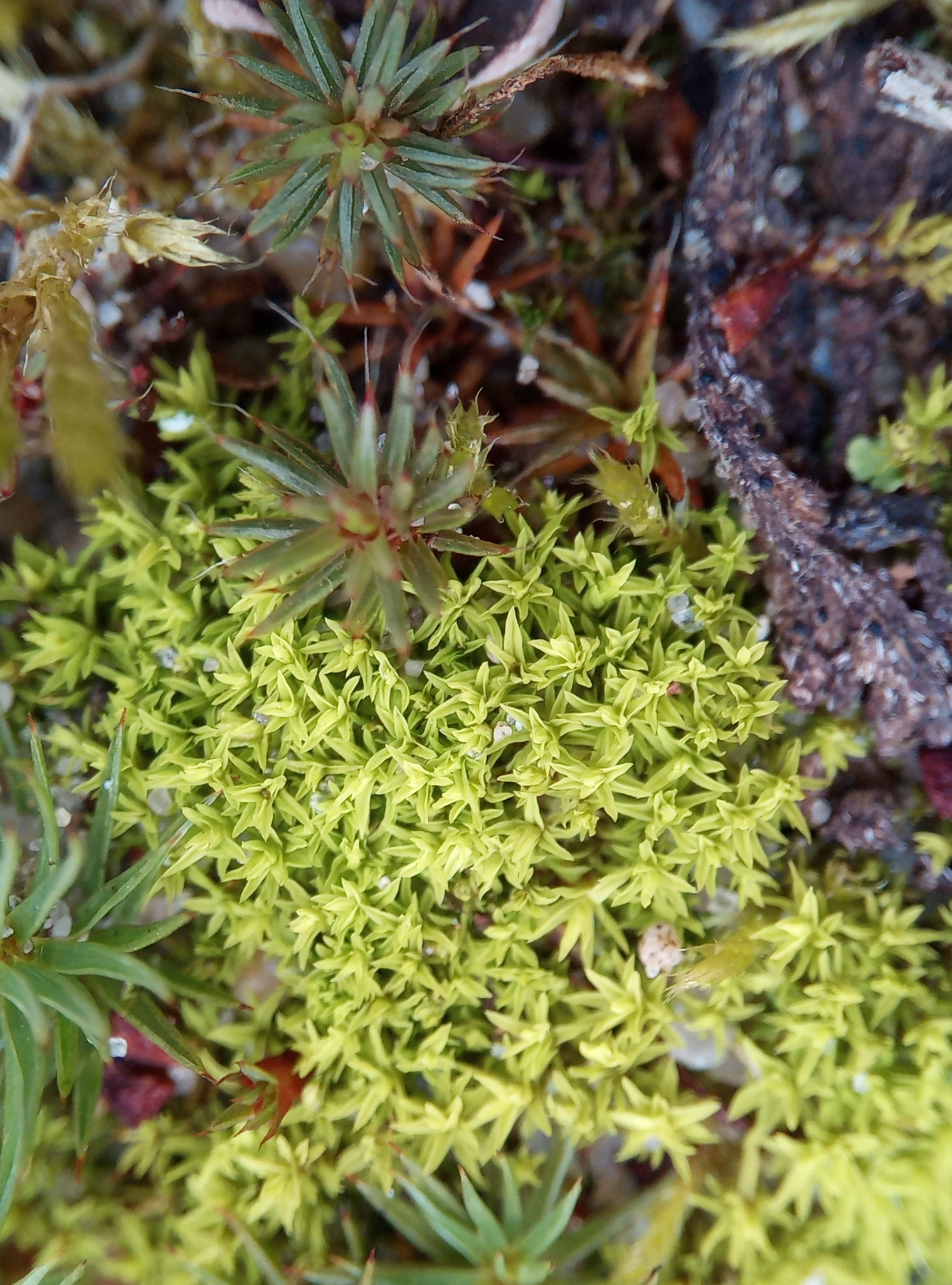

Scientific classification
- Kingdom: Plantae
- Clade: Embryophytes
- Division: Bryophyta
- Class: Bryopsida
- Subclass: Dicranidae
- Order: Pottiales
- Family: Pottiaceae
- Genus: Barbula
- Species: B. convoluta

Binomial name
- Barbula convoluta Hedw.

Synonyms
- List: Tortula convoluta; Barbula chrysopoda; Barbula convoluta Hedw.; Barbula convoluta var. obtusata; Barbula convoluta var. stockumii; Barbula deusta; Barbula girodii; Barbula perannulata; Barbula subconvoluta; Barbula sulcata; Barbula whitehouseae; Tortula setosa; Bryum convolutum; Trichostomum flavisetum; Bryum tenuissimum; Streblotrichum convolutum var. stockumii; Streblotrichum tenuissimum; Barbula eustegia; Barbula convoluta var. convoluta; Barbula convoluta var. eustegia; Streblotrichum convolutum var. convolutum; Barbula convoluta var. angustifolia; Barbula convoluta f. brevifolia; Barbula convoluta f. brunnescens; Barbula convoluta var. filiformis; Barbula convoluta f. insolata; Barbula convoluta f. macrophylla; Barbula convoluta f. rufescens; Barbula convoluta f. rufipes; Barbula convoluta var. turfacea; Barbula convoluta f. uliginosa; Streblotrichum convolutum var. filiforme; Streblotrichum convolutum var. girodii; Streblotrichum convolutum; Streblotrichum convolutum var. uligonosum; Tortula convoluta var. major; Barbula convoluta var. obtusata; Barbula convoluta var. uliginosa

= Barbula convoluta =

Species of moss

Barbula convoluta, also called Streblotrichum convolutum, less commonly known as lesser bird's-claw beard-moss and Convoluted Beard Moss is a species of moss belonging the family Pottiaceae. The leaves are between 0.5 millimetres (0.020 in) and 1.5 millimetres (0.059 in) in length and are broadly lanceolate or more parallel-sided. The leaves become firm when wet. The stems are 1 to 1.5 centimetres (0.39 to 0.59 in). The seta is slender and yellow, and measured about 1 to 1.8 centimetres (0.39 to 0.71 in), the theca is 0.8 to 1.2 millimetres (0.031 to 0.047 in), and the spores are smooth and measured about 10 to 12 micrometers. Capsules are not common, but it can fruit abundantly with yellow setae and sheathing.

== Distribution ==
Barbula convoluta is very common and sometimes grows in great abundance. It is found in exposed sites, mainly in urban settings, on soil, sand, gravel, granite, bricks, walls, sandstone, limestone, dunes, paths and boulders. Associated mosses include Barbula unguiculata, Bryum argenteum, Ceratodon purpureus, and Tortula muralis.

== See also ==
- Barbula unguiculata
