= Wadi Tiwi =

Canyon in the Ash Sharqiyah Region of Oman

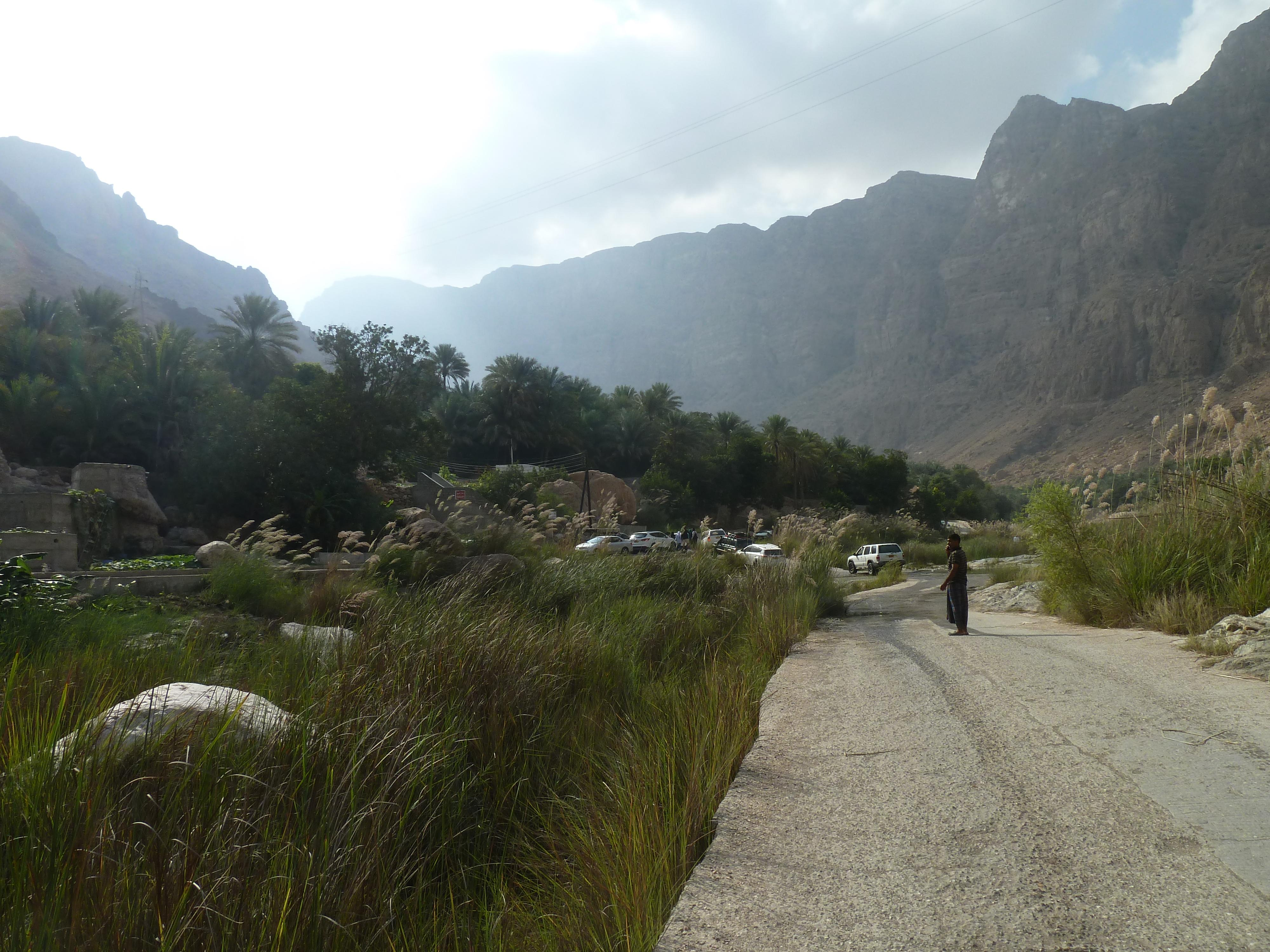
- Harat Bidah (حارة بده) village in Wadi Tiwi

- Location within Oman

Geography
- Coordinates: 22°48′3″N 59°14′40″E
- Interactive map of Wadi Tiwi

Wadi Tiwi is a canyon, 40km north of Sur in the Ash Sharqiyah Region of Oman. Dramatically situated where the Hajar Mountains reach the sea at Tiwi and enclosed by steep canyon walls, Wadi Tiwi has been continuously inhabited for at least a thousand years. Although the region is desert, water drains from the mountain plateau to the north-west and flows in the upper part of the wadi throughout the year, even in times of drought and there are many small pools. Falaj irrigation channels have been skilfully constructed throughout the canyon resulting in lush green vegetation, date palms, terraced farms and tall grasses in the wadi stream.

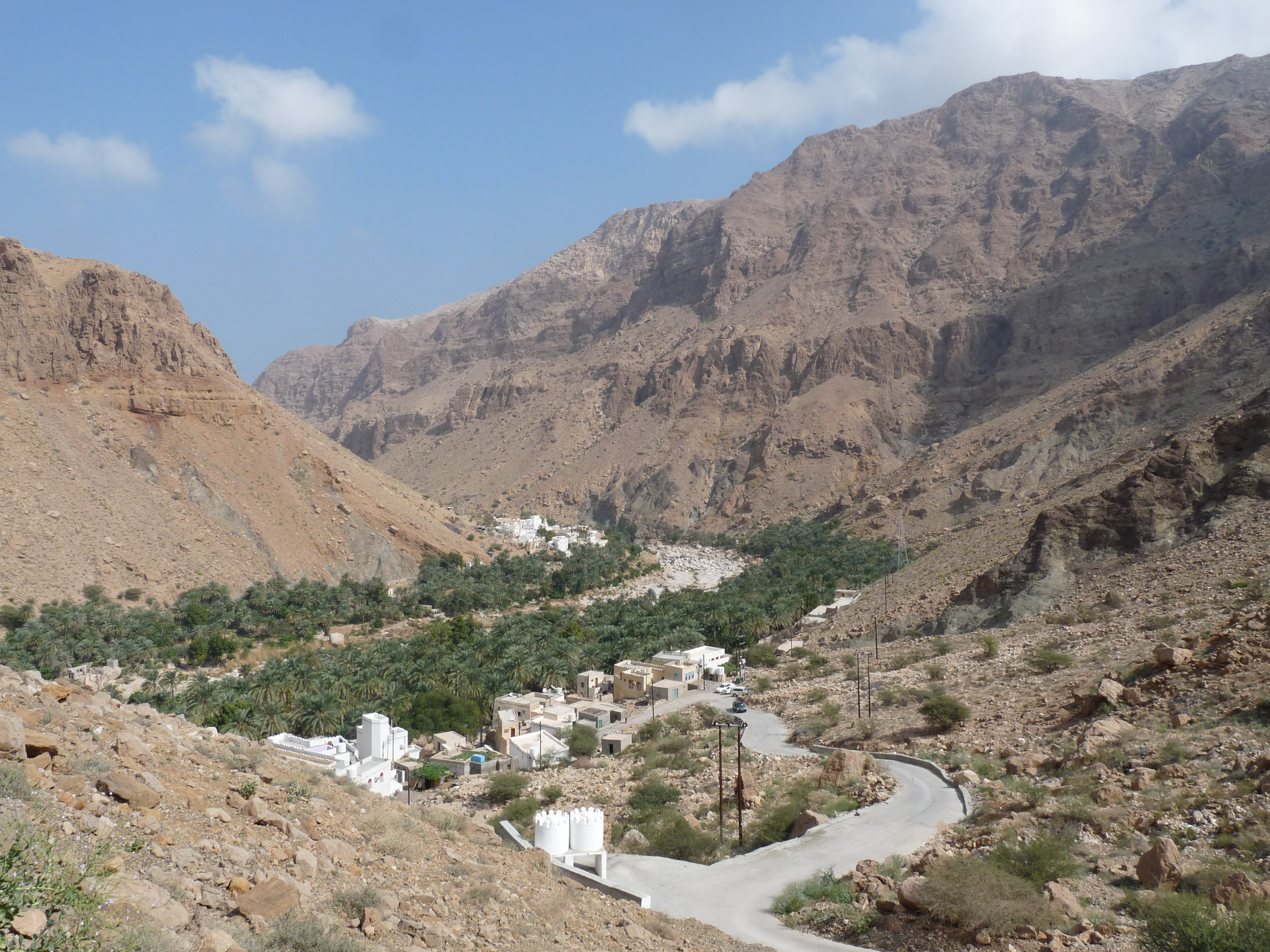
Village in Wadi Tiwi with date palm groves

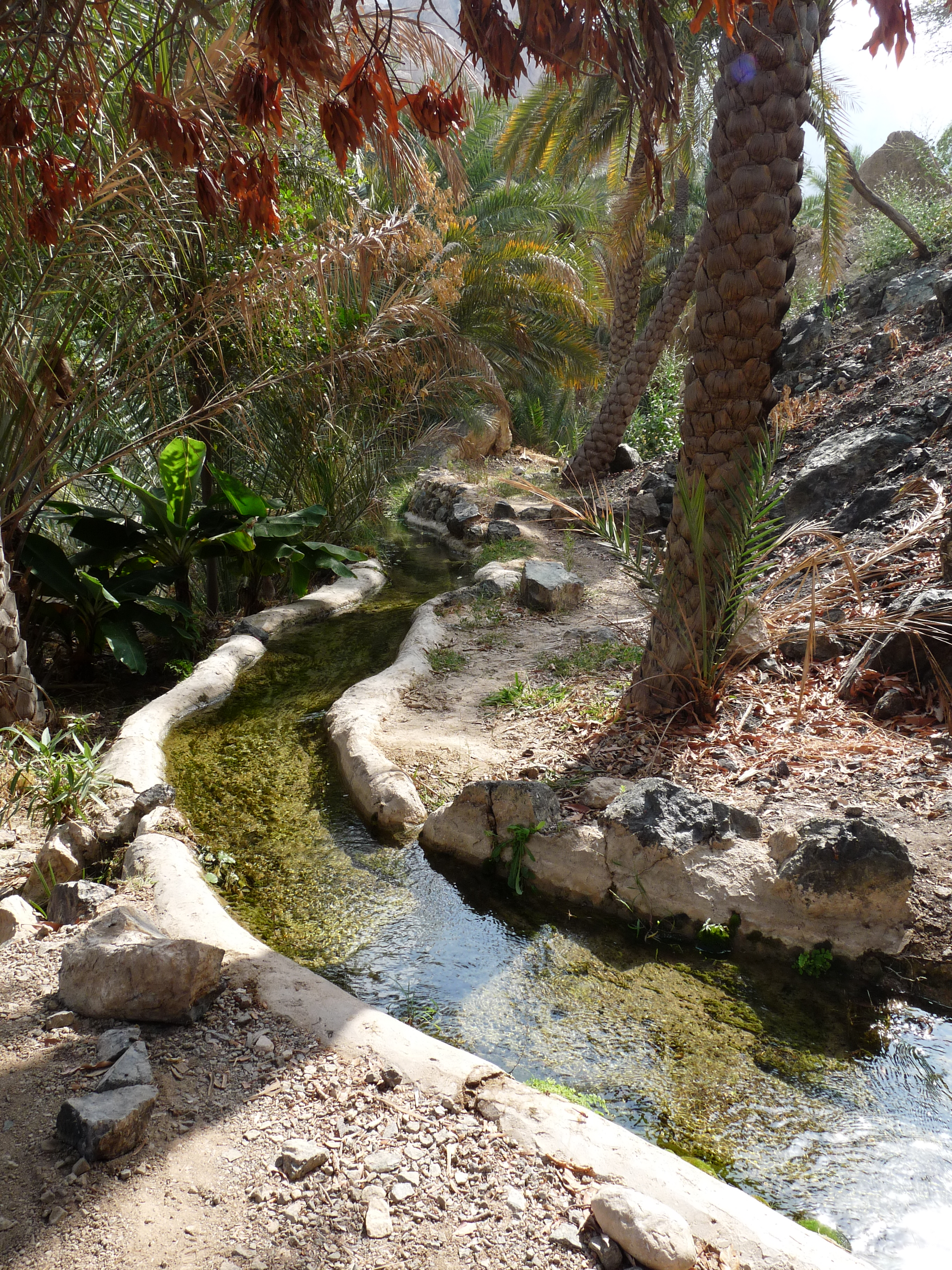
Falaj irrigation channel in Wadi Tiwi

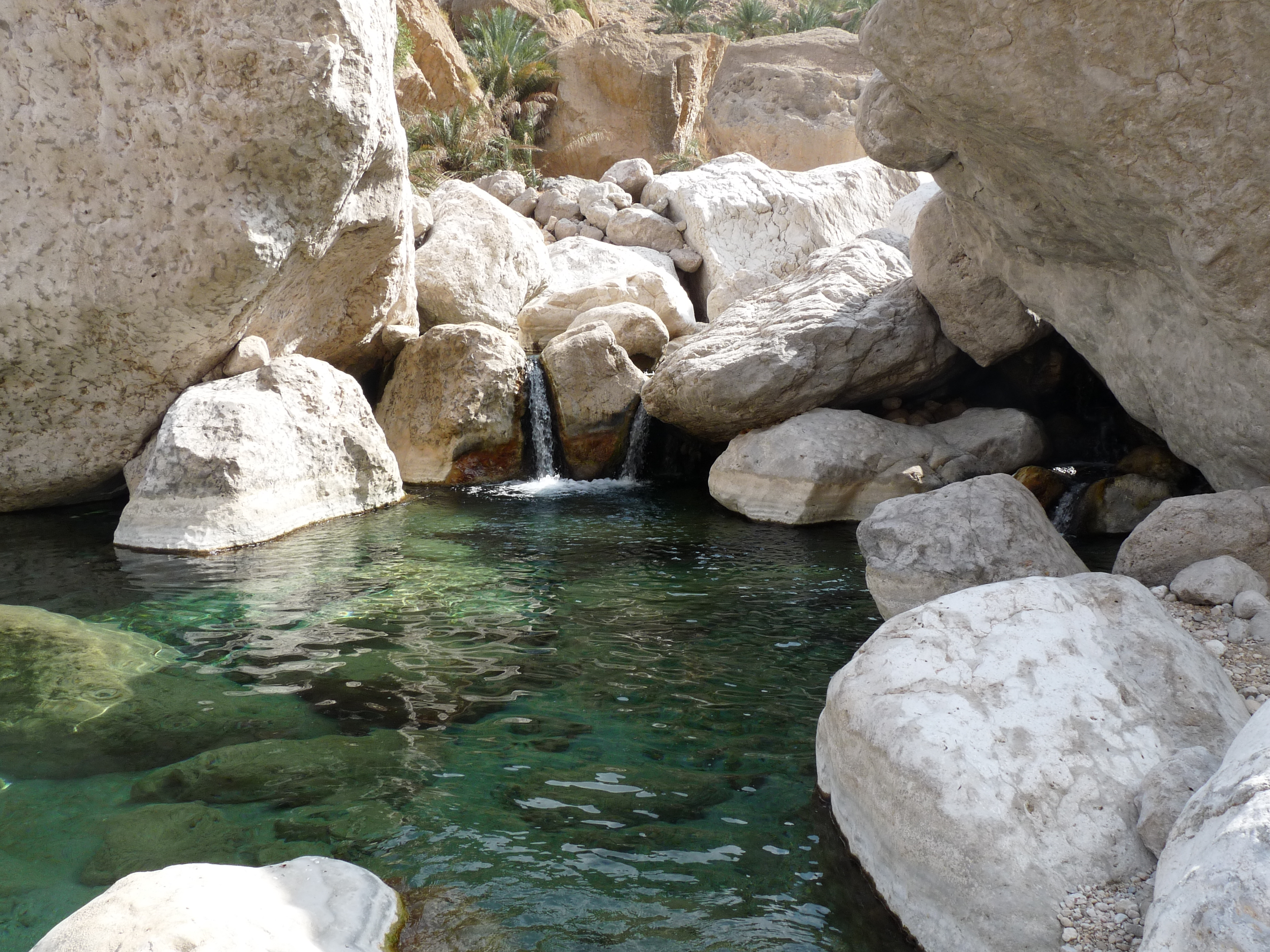
One of many small pools

== Flora and Fauna ==
Most of the agricultural land in Wadi Tiwi is used for date palms which require a lot of water. Other plants, including bananas, lime, papaya and mango, are cultivated by farmers. Dwarf Cavendish and Bluggoe make up over 90% of the banana plants, but in total 7 different cultivars of bananas are found in the canyon. The diversity of banana plants is due to trade with India since the 1400s and speaks to a depth of agricultural knowledge over generations. The Oman Botanic Garden successfully cultivated a Musa banana plant that came from Wadi Tiwi which is estimated to have been grown in the canyon for 500 years. Before modernization (circa 1970) wheat, sorghum and alfalfa were grown on the terraces in Wadi Tiwi.

The tall grass which grows in the wadi stream is Pennisetum setaceum which is common on both sides of the Hajar mountains. Growing beside the road is a buckthorn tree which takes its name from the mountain range, Ziziphus harjarensis, which is endemic to Northern Oman. Amongst other unexpected flora found in the canyon are ferns (including Pteris vittata) and mosses (including Barbula indica and Orthotrichum cupulatum)

Many birds can be seen around the two large pools at the mouth of the canyon, including Grey heron, Great cormorant, Grey Wagtail, Temminck's stint. Near the villages in the mid-canyon, Rose-ringed parakeets dart around the tree-tops. Indian silverbills and Palm doves are often seen amongst the tall grasses. Other species can be identified in the List of birds of Oman. In the pools near Harat Bidah (حارة بده) village are Red garra fish (or "Doctor fish" famous for nibbling on the skin of bathers) and Arabian toads are vocal at dusk.

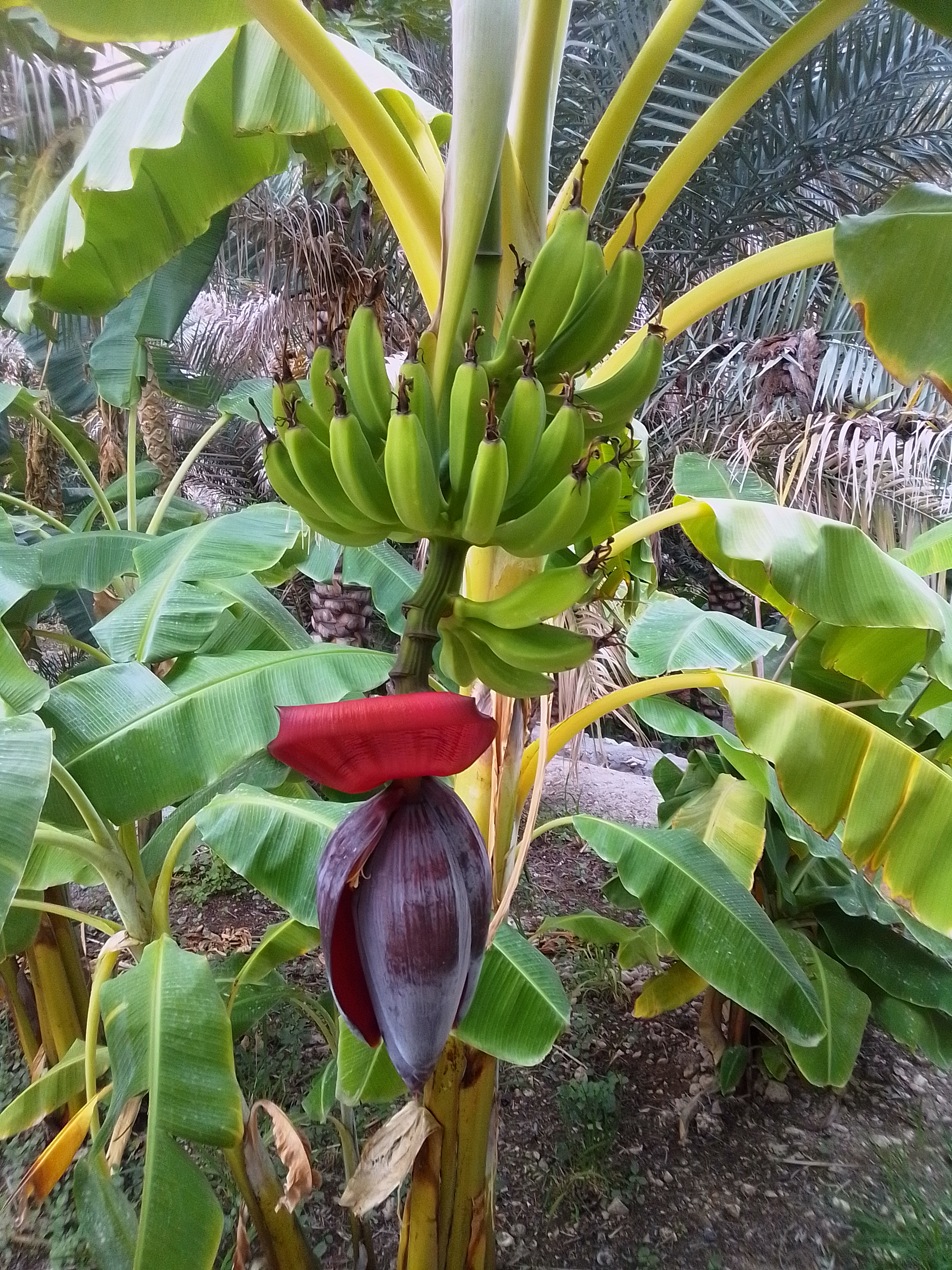
Bananas in Wadi Tiwi

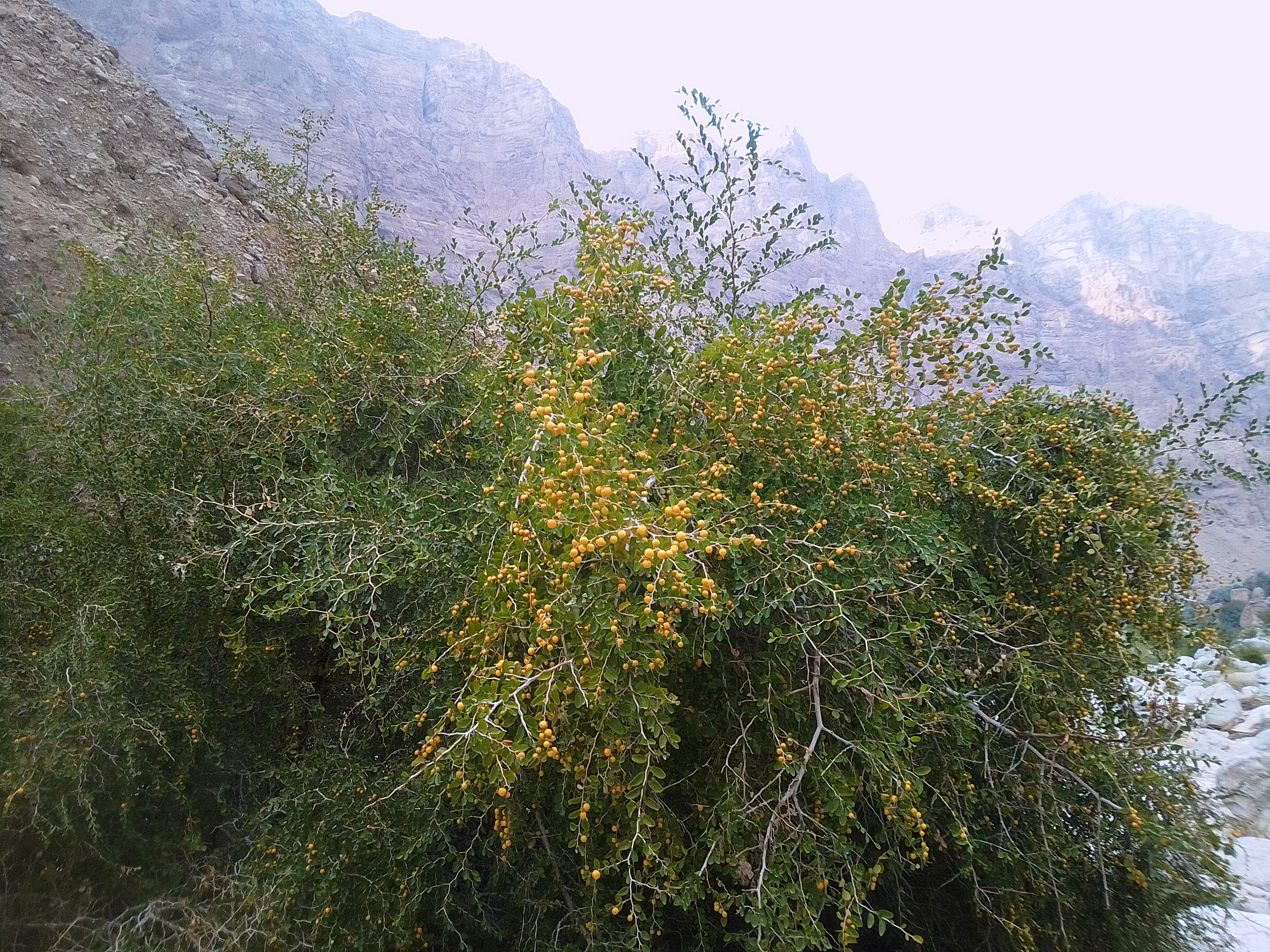
Ziziphus hajarensis in Wadi Tiwi

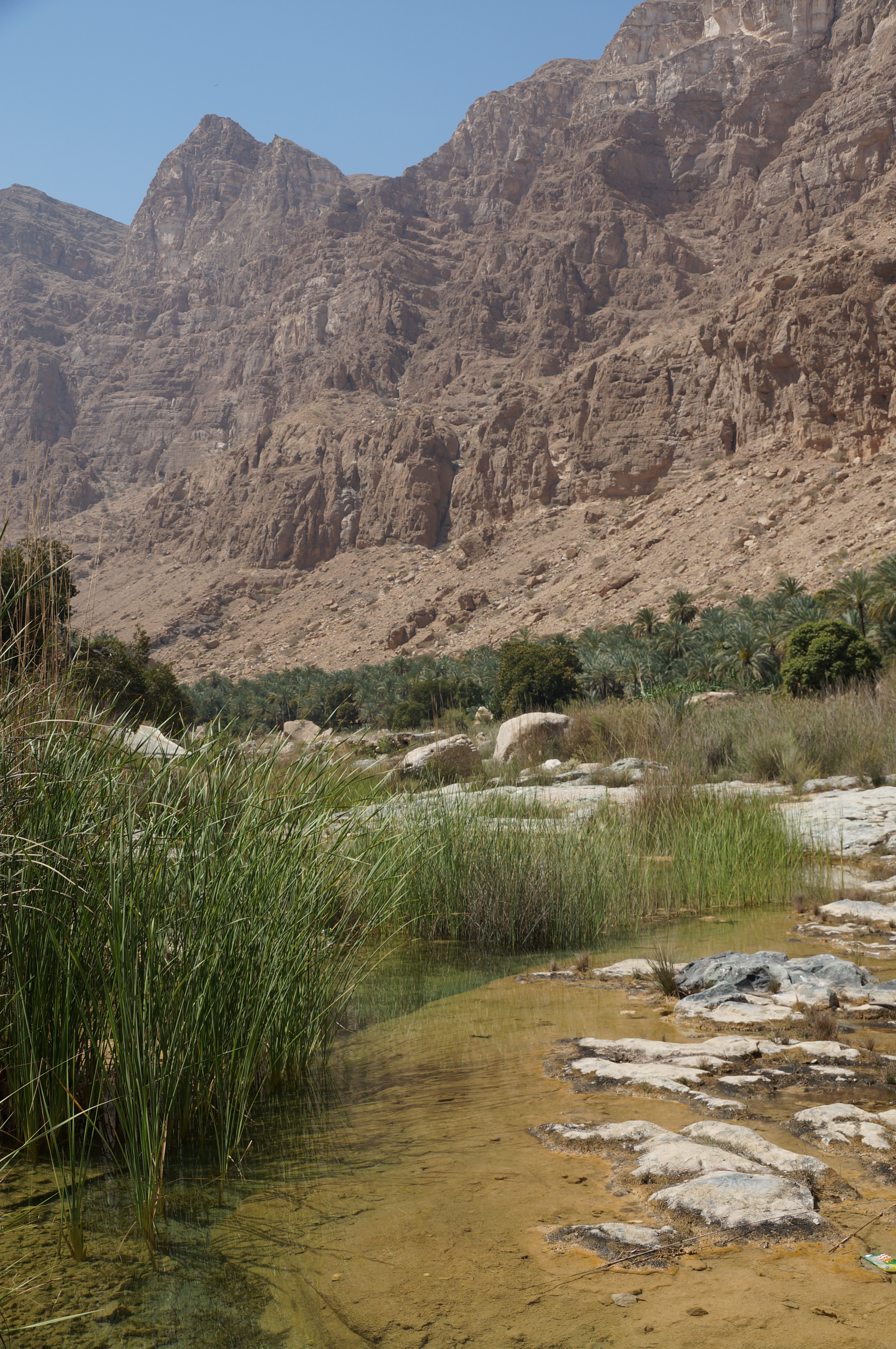
Pennisetum setaceum grass in Wadi Tiwi

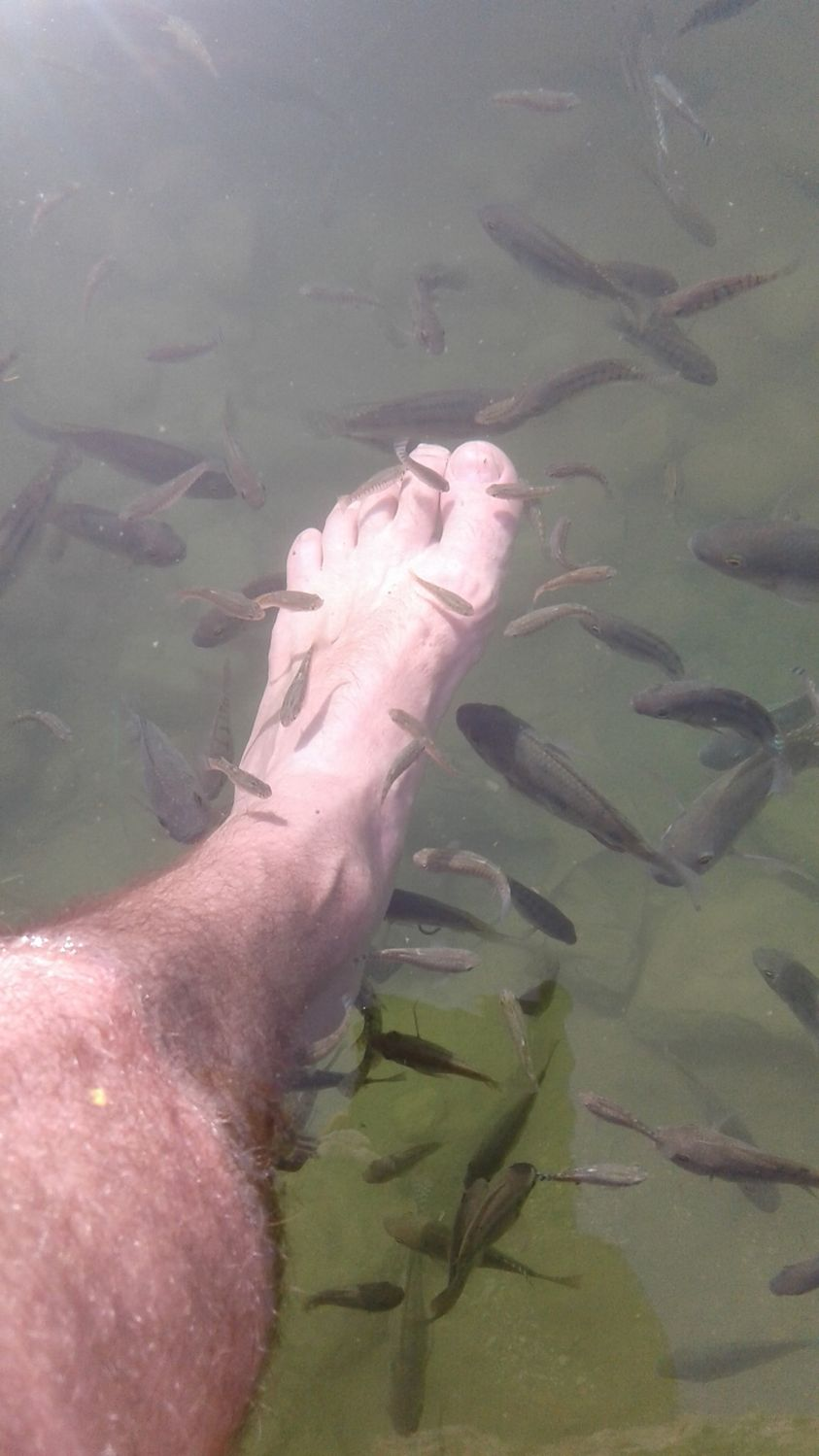
Red garra fish in Wadi Tiwi

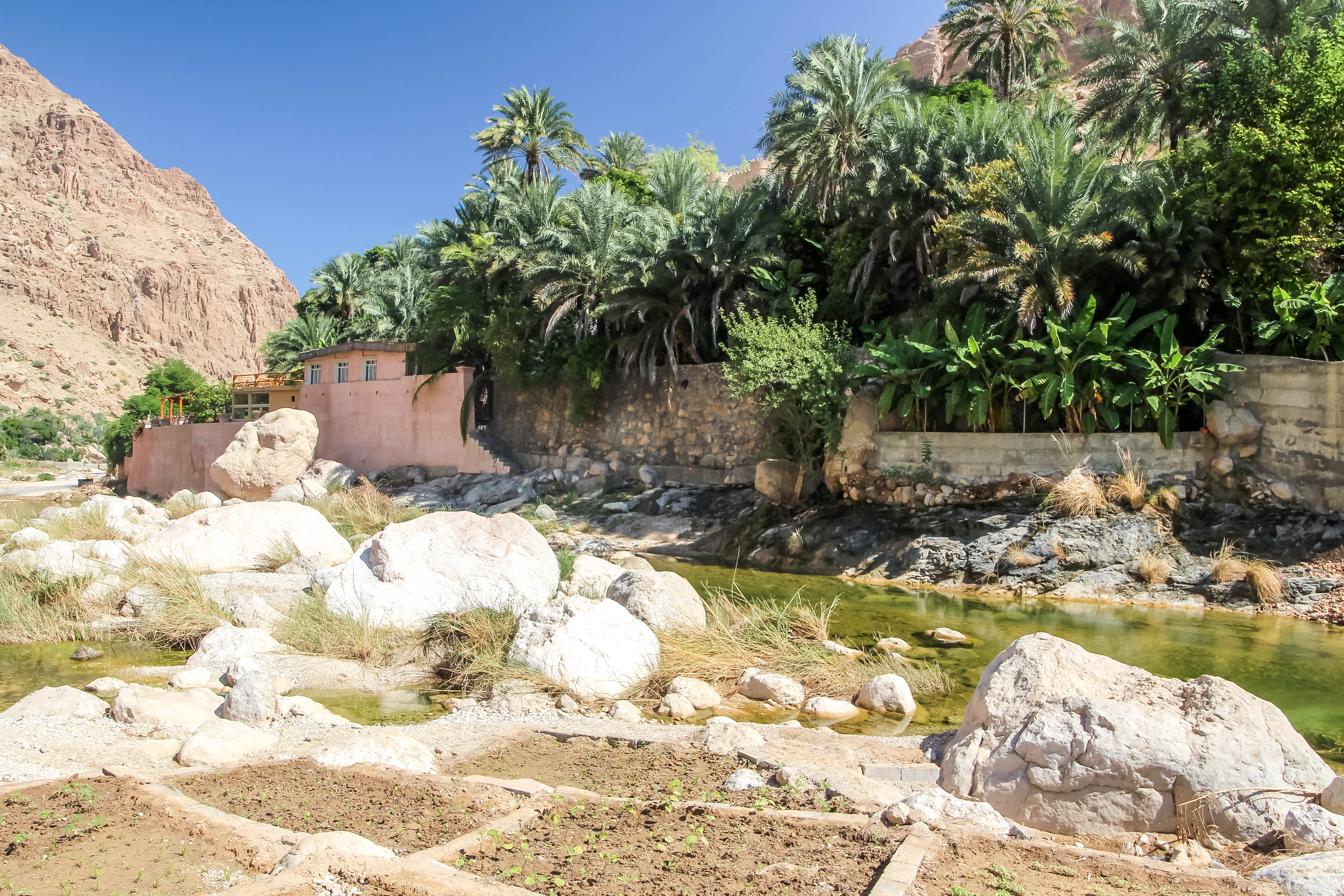
agriculture in Wadi Tiwi
