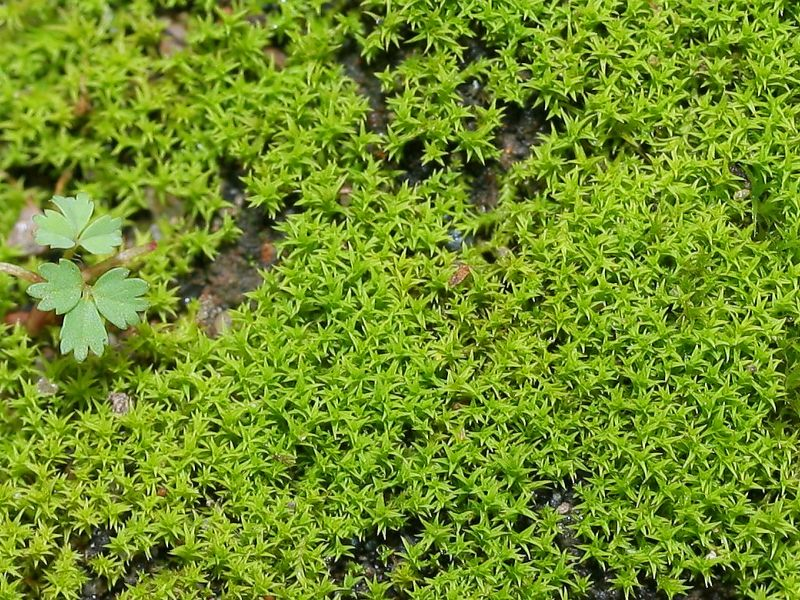

Scientific classification
- Kingdom: Plantae
- Division: Bryophyta
- Class: Bryopsida
- Subclass: Dicranidae
- Order: Pottiales
- Family: Pottiaceae
- Genus: Barbula
- Species: B. unguiculata

Binomial name
- Barbula unguiculata Hedw.

Synonyms
- List: Barbula amoena Schumach.; Barbula apiculata Hedw.; Barbula aristata (Dicks.) Brid.; Barbula dubia Schumach.; Barbula ericetorum (Dicks. ex With.) P. Beauv.; Barbula fastigiata Schultz; Barbula gattefossei P. de la Varde; Barbula himantina Besch.; Barbula incerta Schumach.; Barbula indigens (Renauld & Cardot) Renauld & Cardot; Barbula linoides (Hedw.) Brid.; Barbula mucronulata Hoffm. ex F. Weber & D. Mohr; Barbula nervosa Crome; Barbula ochracea Broth.; Barbula saundersii Cardot & Thér.; Barbula stricta Hedw.; Barbula subunguiculata Schimp. ex Besch.; Barbula tokyensis Besch.; Barbula trichostomifolia Müll. Hal.; Barbula unguiculata var. apiculata (Hedw.) Bruch & Schimp.; Bryum aristatum Dicks.; Bryum ericetorum Dicks. ex With.; Bryum linoides Hedw.; Bryum mucronulatum Dicks. ex With.; Dialytrichia canariensis Bryhn; Dicranum laxum Brid.; Didymodon mildei Schimp.; Orthopyxis aristata (Dicks.) P. Beauv.; Orthopyxis barbata P. Beauv.; Tortula dubia (Schumach.) P. Beauv.; Tortula linoides (Hedw.) P. Beauv.; Tortula tenuis P. Beauv.; Trichostomum indigens Renauld & Cardot; Trichostomum pensylvanicum Spreng.

= Barbula unguiculata =

Species of moss

Barbula unguiculata, also called as Bird's-claw Beard-moss is a species of moss belonging to the family Pottiaceae. Its color is usually distinctive, a kind of bright yellow-green shared by few similar acrocarps such as Trichostomum species. Its leaves always look opaque, thanks to its densely papillose leaf cells. In dry conditions, the leaves frequently twist or curl around the stem, whereas they spread outward when moist. Each leaf is parallel-sided for most of its lengths.

The stems of Barbula unguiculata typically reach lengths of approximately 1 to 2 millimetres (0.039 to 0.079 in), while the leaves generally measure between 1 and 2.5 millimetres (0.039 and 0.098 in) in length. The seta of Barbula unguiculata is 1 to 2.5 centimetres (0.39 to 0.98 in), and the spores are 8 to 11 μm. Capsules mature in winter and early spring, occasionally summer or fall.

== Distribution ==
Barbula unguiculata typically colonizes open, exposed and disturbed sites, on soil, sand, gravel, sandstone, granite, limestone, walls, roadcuts, paths, lawns, ditches, boulders, and cliff crevices, and low to high elevations (50-2700 m). It is frequently found on eutrophic grounds, such as sidewalks and arable fields.

== Habitat ==
Barbula unguiculata is known to be able to use artificial light to grow in places which are otherwise devoid of natural light, such as Niagara Cave and Crystal Cave in Wisconsin. Barbula unguiculata is common in eastern North America, Asia, and Europe, and elsewhere in the North and South Temperate zones. It is rare in the tropics.

== See also ==
- Barbula convoluta
