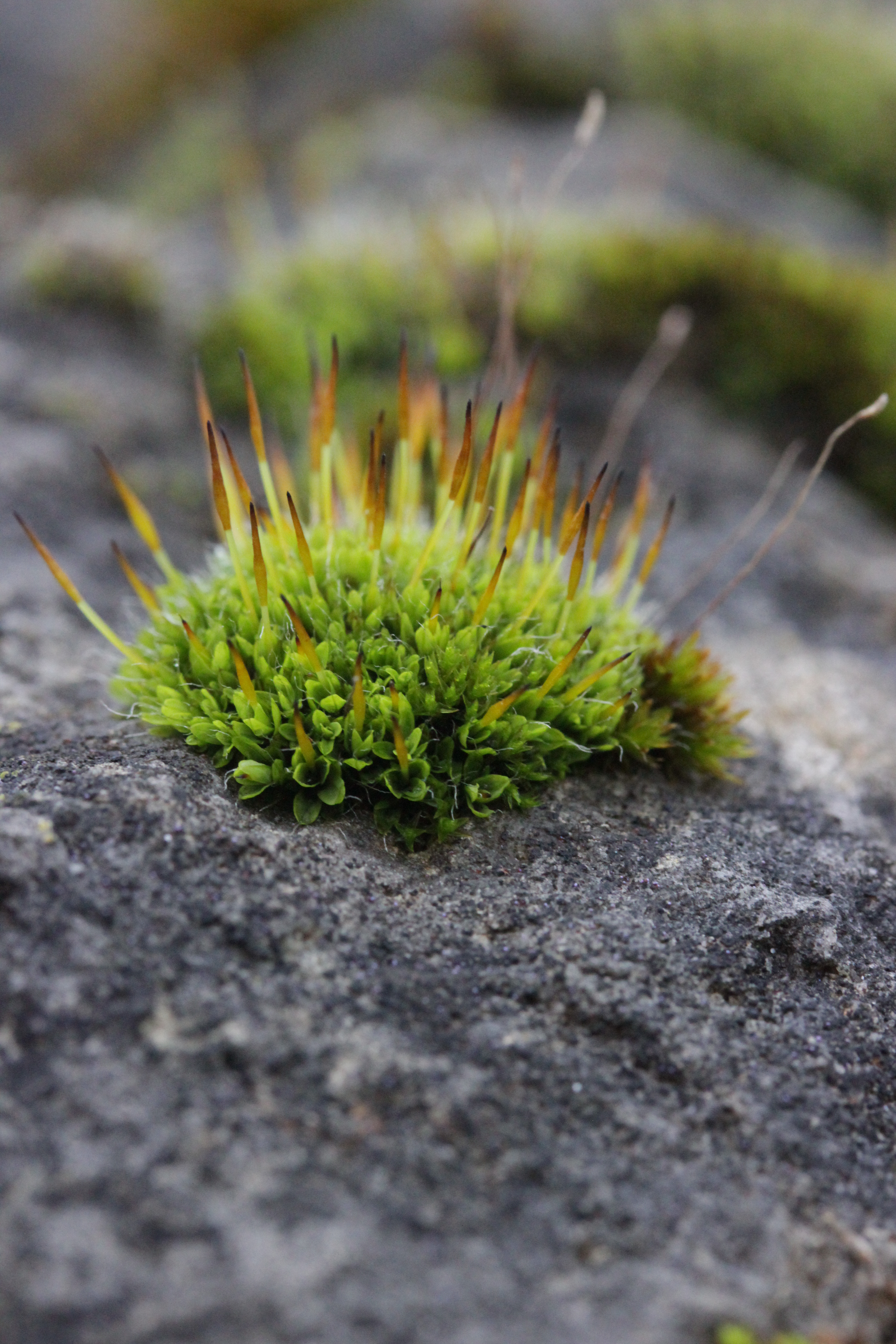

Conservation status
- Secure (NatureServe)

Scientific classification
- Kingdom: Plantae
- Division: Bryophyta
- Class: Bryopsida
- Subclass: Dicranidae
- Order: Pottiales
- Family: Pottiaceae
- Genus: Tortula
- Species: T. muralis

Binomial name
- Tortula muralis Hedw.

= Tortula muralis =

Species of moss

Tortula muralis, commonly known as wall screw-moss, is a species of moss in the family Pottiaceae. T. muralis is found throughout the world.

== Taxonomy ==
Due to the diversity of the genus Tortula, there are groups of taxa within the genus that are more closely related than others. The genus Tortula and the genus Barbula were previously used interchangeably, and some species have since been reclassified.

The T. muralis complex consists of four taxa (T. lingulate, T. obtusifolia, T. muralis var. aestiva, T. muralis var. muralis), two of which are T. muralis varieties. They are similar in appearance and are commonly mistaken for each other.

- T. lingulate have a relatively large spore size (10 – 18.5 μm) compared to the other three (7.5 – 13.5 μm).
- T. obtusifolia and T. muralis var. aestiva both have short hairpoints and difficult to distinguish.
- T. muralis var. muralis are very similar to T. muralis var. aestiva but have longer hairpoints and grows in high sun-exposure and dry conditions.

== Description ==
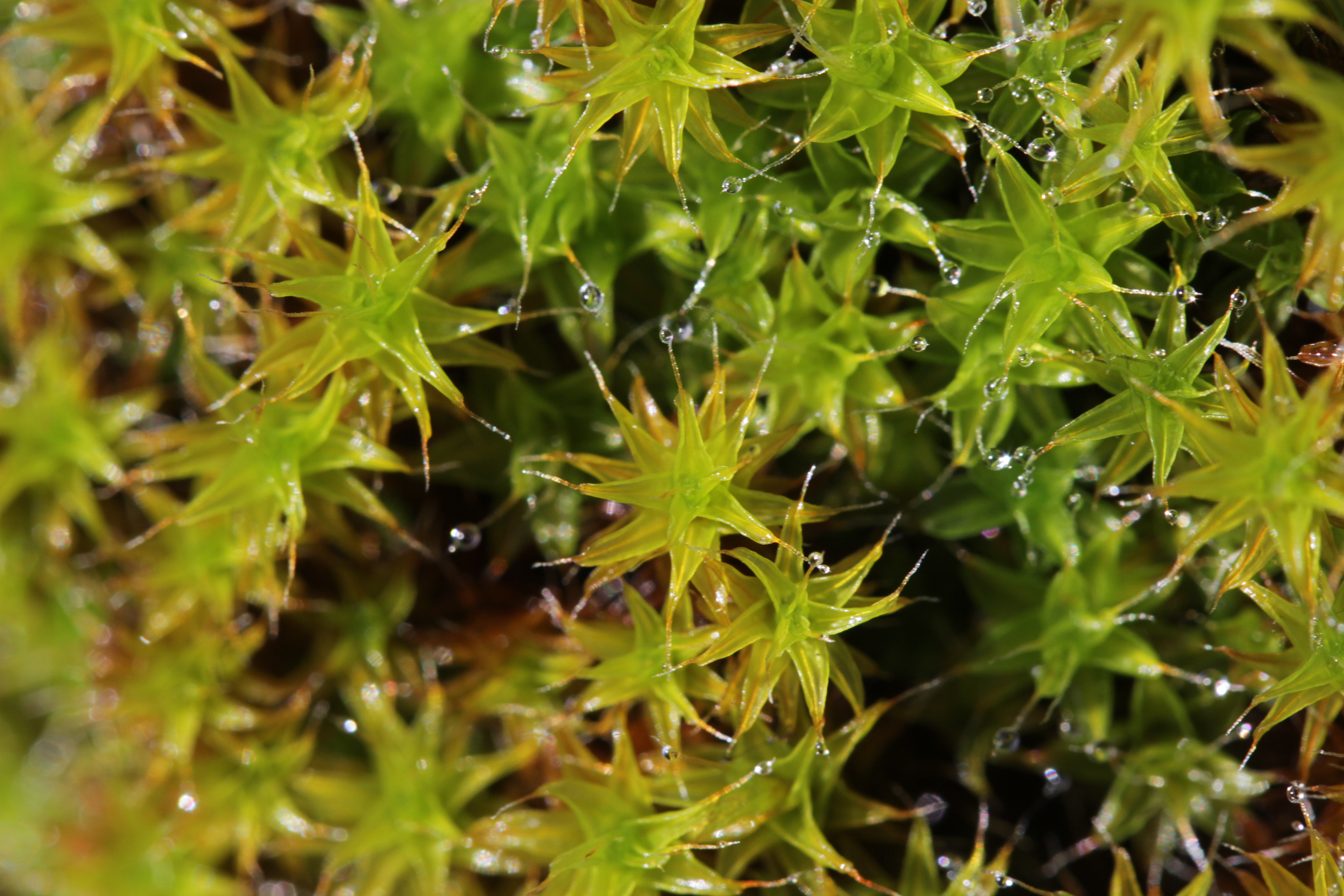
T. muralis gametophyte

Tortula muralis forms greyish-green cushions no more than 1 cm (0.39 in) tall, with tongue-shaped leaves possessing acute to rounded leaf apices that approach a point. The leaf margins are narrowly recurved near their apex, and are distally bordered with two to four thicker rows of cells that bear or lack papillae. The costa are long, sometimes excurrent, and lack an adaxial pad of cells. They are narrow distally, with hexagonal distal laminal cells measuring 10–15 μm wide. These cells bear many papillae. The moss is autoicous, and its sporophytes are exerted. Its seta measure 0.6–1.5 cm (0.24–0.59 in). Its erect and cylindrical capsules are stegocarpic, not systylius. Its urn measures 1.5–2.7 mm and its peristome 300 μm. Its spherical spores are either very finely papillose or border on smooth, measuring 8–12 μm.

The moss can be distinguished from similar mosses by its erect and cylindrical capsule and its "hair-pointed" leaves. Neighboring Barbula species are distinguished primarily by its lack of hair-pointed leaves and Grimmia species, which possess the hair-apices, have short and ovoid capsules. Other Tortula species are similar morphologically to T. muralis, but none are as abundant as the species. Microscopically, T. moralis differs from other Tortula species in its recurved leaf margins and smooth hair-apex.

== Habitat and distribution ==
T. muralis is most commonly found at moderate elevations in urban areas on concrete, brick walls, soil, rocks, or trees. Distribution of T. muralis is said to be cosmopolitan, meaning that it is widely distributed across the globe and can be found in a variety of conditions. It is found in North America, South America, Europe, Asia, Africa, Atlantic islands, New Zealand, and Australia.

== Life cycle ==
Just as in all other byophytes, T. muralis undergoes an alternation of heteromorphic generations, meaning that it alternates between two generations: gametophyte and sporophyte.

=== Gametophyte generation (haploid) ===
The haploid gametophyte generation is the dominant state. Begins with the haploid spores that gives rise to protonema, and eventually producing the gametophyte. The gametophyte then develops the reproductive structures: archegonium, the female reproductive structure that produces eggs, and antheridium, the male reproductive structure that produces sperms. The egg and the sperm fuse together to form a diploid zygote.

=== Sporophyte generation (diploid) ===
The diploid sporophyte generation begins when the zygote is formed. The zygote eventually becomes an embryo and gives rise to the sporophyte which produces spores through meiosis and are released when conditions are optimal.

Bryophyte Life cycle

== Air quality indicator ==
Mosses have been used to monitor long-term air pollution such as trace metal depositions. Mosses are used as air quality trackers because the elements are drawn into the moss through air absorption as well as water absorption in which the rain carries the elements into the tissues. Ultimately, the absorbed element concentration in the moss precisely measures the air pollution in the atmosphere. In most cases, mosses with a pleurocarpous growth habit are used because they are more sensitive to dryness and pollution. However, not many are found in urban areas and thus, T. muralis, an acrocarpous moss, are used to monitor long-term air pollution in urban areas.

== Conservation ==
T. muralis is recognized as a G5 status indicating that the species is "globally secure, abundant, and demonstrably widespread".
