= Samad al-Shan =

Archaeological site on Oman

Coordinates: 22°48′40″N 58°9′0″E

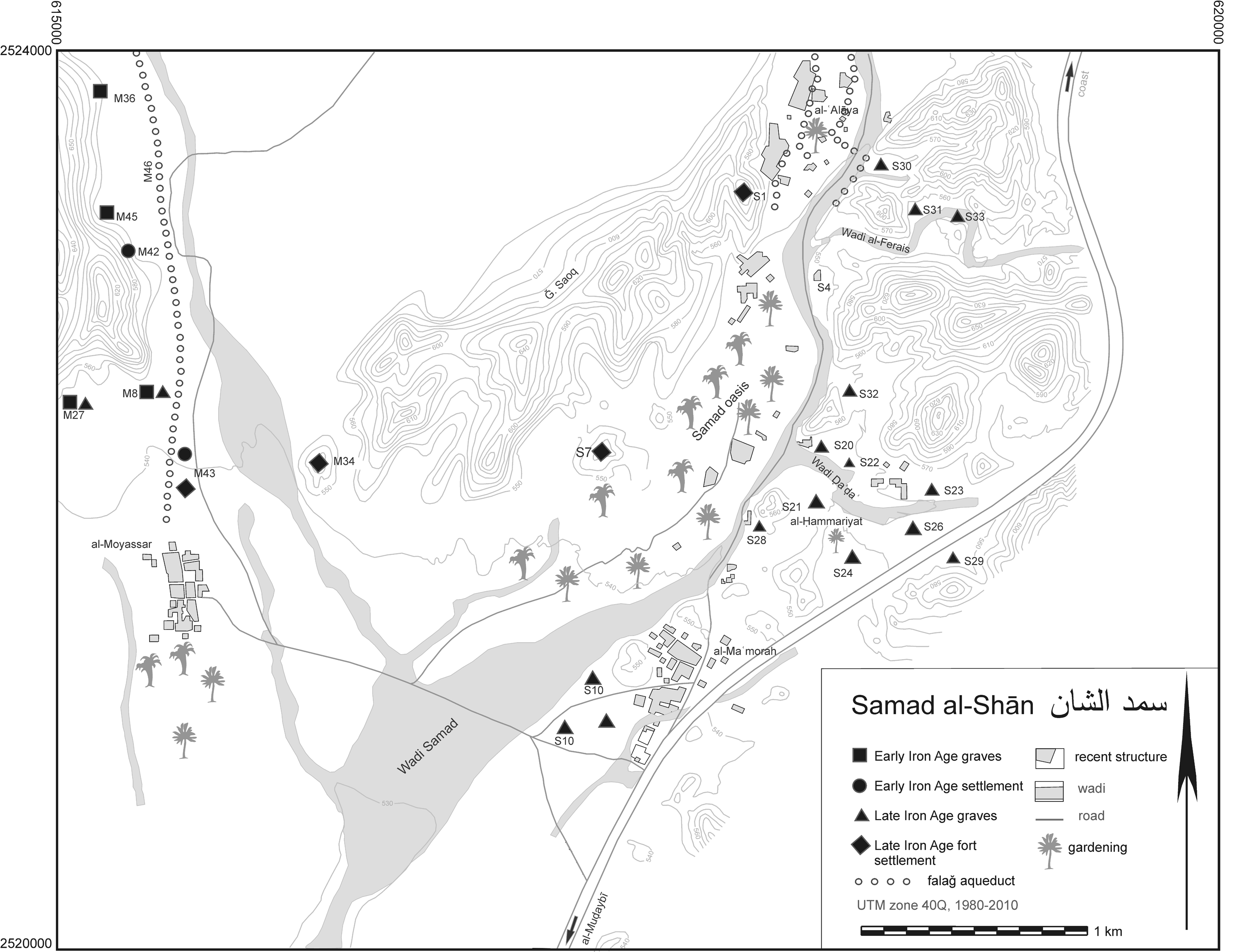
Plan of the archaeological sites in Wadi Samad, near Samad al-Shan and al-Moyassar, al-Sharqiyah province

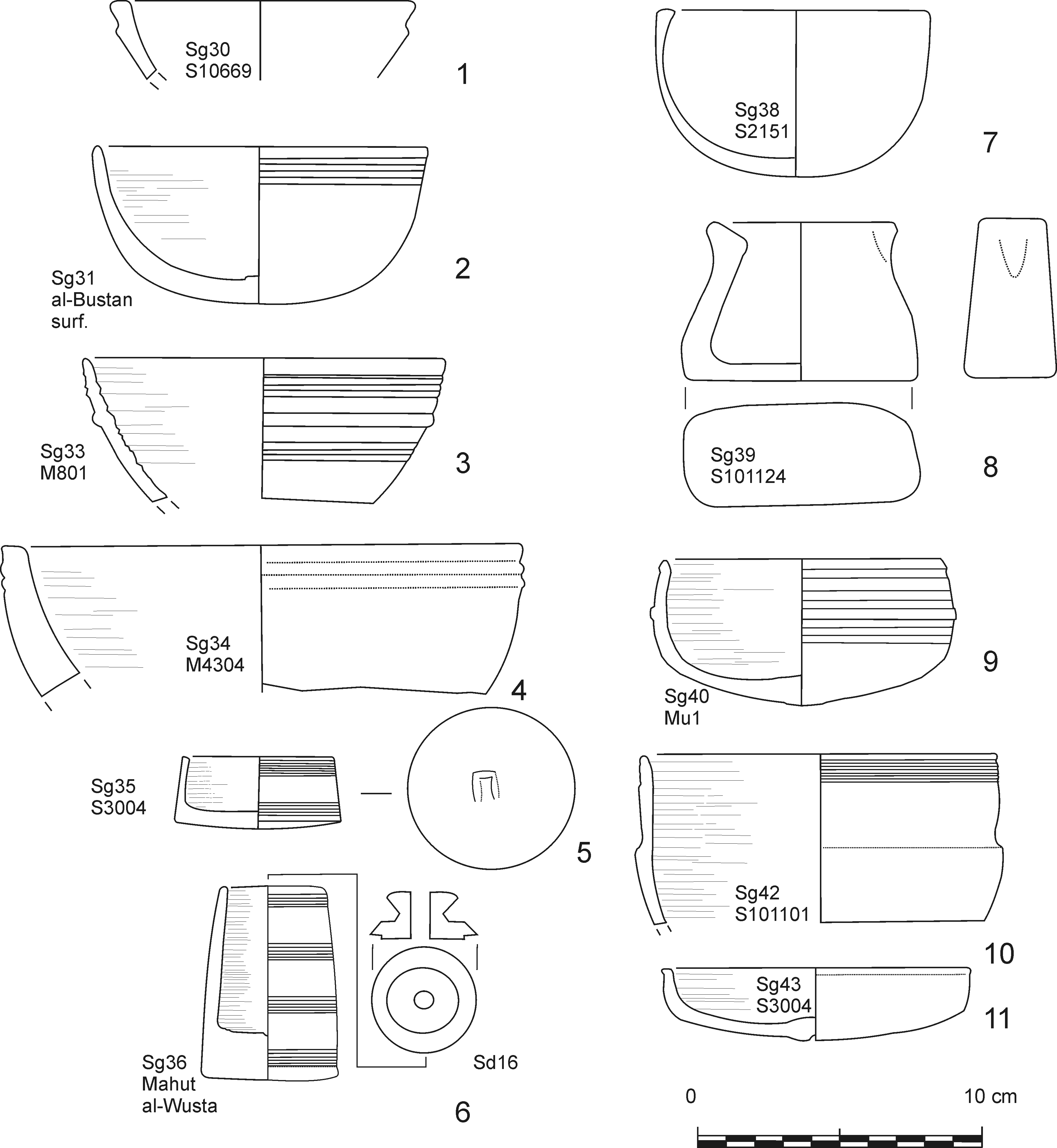
Stone vessels from Samad Late Iron Age contexts. Several are lathe-turned.

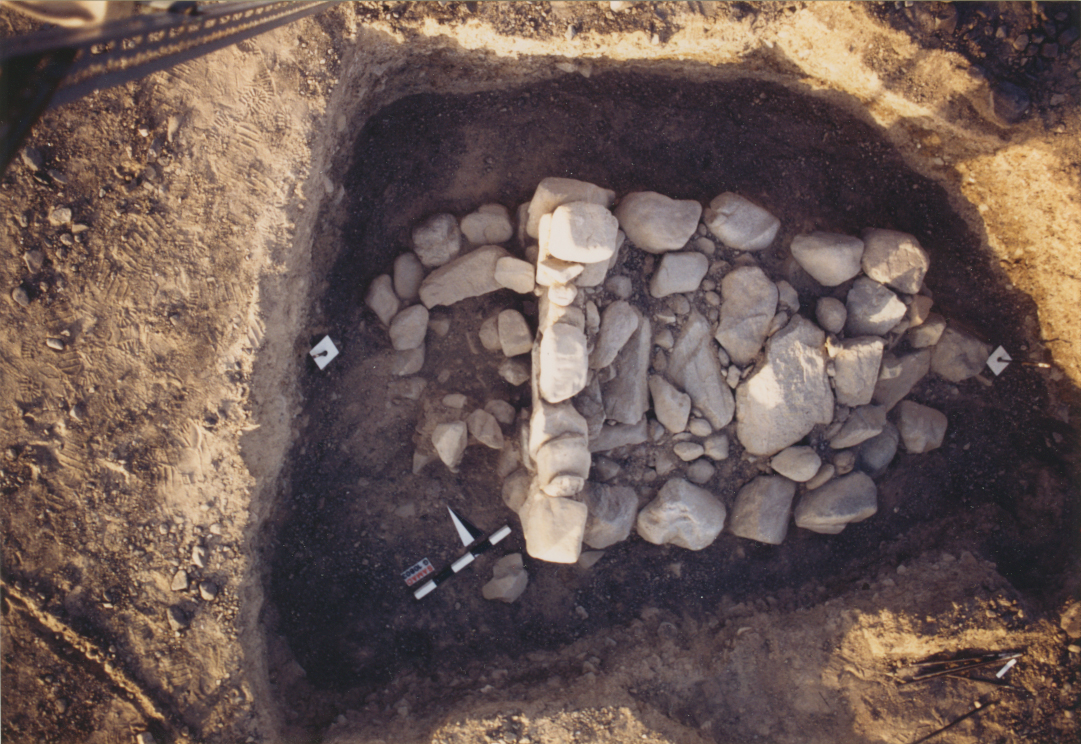
This Samad Late Iron Age grave is viewed vertically. At the north-west end (left) the body was inserted head first.

Samad al-Shan (22°48'N; 58°09'E, altitude 565 m) is an archaeological site in the Sharqiyah province, Oman where Late Iron Age remains were first identified, hence the Samad Period or assemblage.

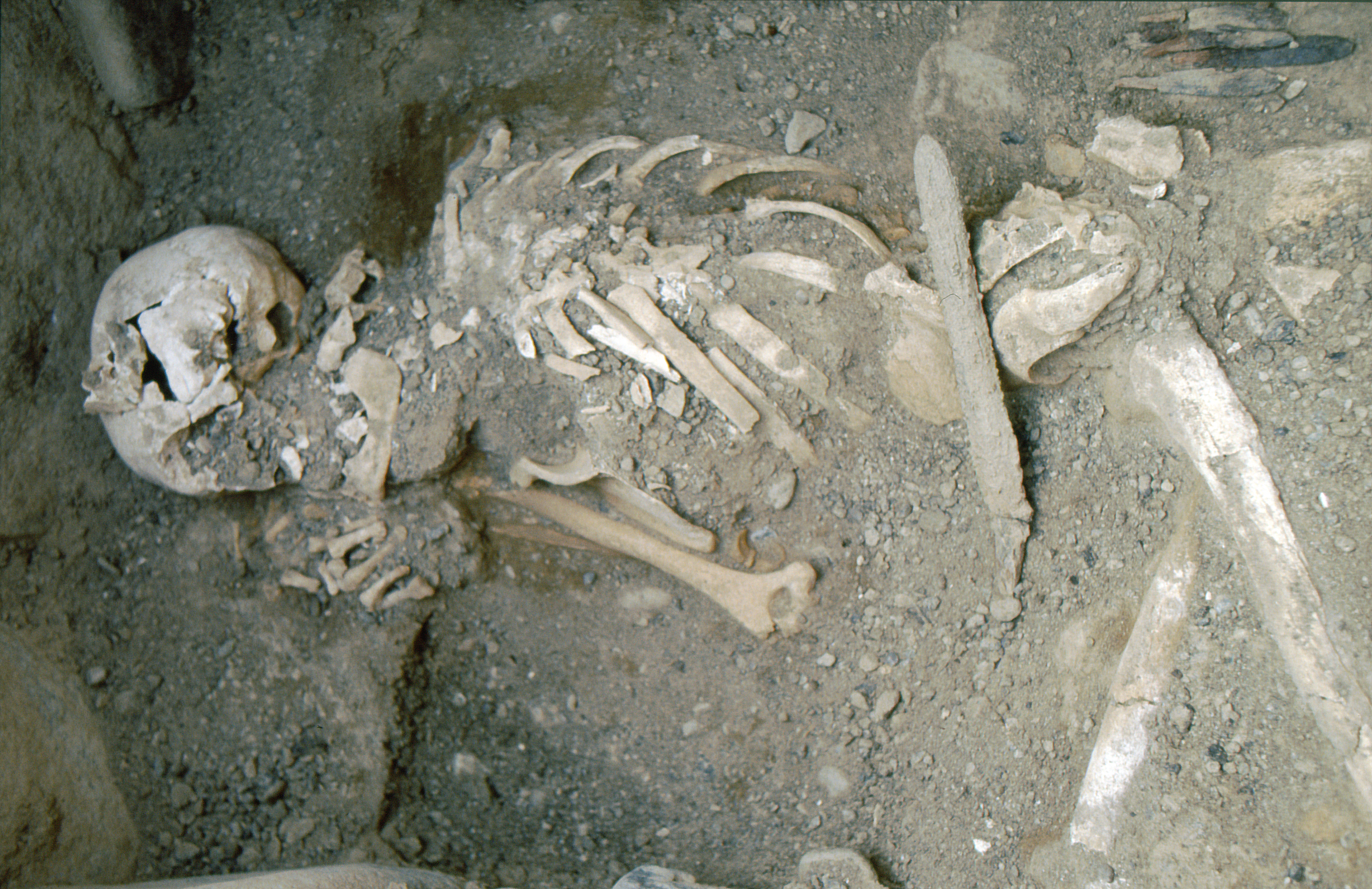
Skeleton of a man with a sword and arrow-heads, Samad al-Shan, Sultanate of Oman, Samad Late Iron Age.

This oasis is located 2 km east of the village of "al-Maysar" (since c. 1995 al-Moyassar). In 1976 a small part of site was discovered by British archaeological surveyors. The archaeologist Gerd Weisgerber began mapping in 1981. The excavation of this site (1981–82) by Burkhard Vogt, Gerd Weisgerber and Paul Yule, 1987–98, of the German Mining Museum, Bochum and later University of Heidelberg documented some 260 graves which span the Bronze Age to Late Iron Age, which are particular to the Sultanate of Oman. Samad is the type-site for the non-writing Late Iron Age of Central Oman in south-eastern Arabia. Known from 126 sites, this cultural assemblage evidences occasional examples of protoscript in the form of characters scratched onto pottery vessels. In 2016 and subsequently by virtue of 126 sites, Yule re-focussed the characterisation of the Samad assemblage and the ethno-linguistic identity of its population.

The subterranean stone graves in Central Oman range from fairly simple to elaborate and up to 9 m in length (at Feg). Manfred Kunter first determined that biologically defined mature males usually are placed the right side and mature females on the left. The graves and grave goods of the deceased of both sexes range from low to high status (grave size, number and kind of grave equipment). Individuals with more robust skeletons (heavier bones and heavier muscle attachment marks) tend to have better graves and grave goods. More than twice as many men have graves than women, still fewer children's graves came to light. However, the children may have been buried in separate unexcavated parts of the cemeteries. If more men had better graves, then men probably also had during their lives, more property rights than did women. The graves of men contain weapons, especially arrow-heads, quiver remains and daggers, as opposed to women's grave in which weapons never occur. Both men and women wore beads. The local pottery is hand-made and imported glazed 'perfume bottles' and balsamaria are wheel-turned. Several soft stone bowls are lathe-turned. Some finds have not survived, especially organic ones and most objects in precious metal. Missing, but expected, are clothing, leather articles such as shoes, liquid containers and shields, arrow shafts, bows and woven basketry. In the after-life one would have need to draw water, but nothing of the sort has survived. A few of the grave goods are damaged, for whatever reason. Neither body painting nor tattooing survived. Who the person was affected how they were buried and the individual bits that made up their identity were represented in various ways.

Regardless of their origin, as they are known today the Samad Late Iron Age population are date farmers and not herders, who migrate between winter and summer pasturage. However, there are several stages of transition from herders to settlers, from pastoralists to nomads and pastoral life is an essential part of farming. Aside from the catastrophic dentitions, the result of their diet, nothing in the graves reveals the economy either as farmers or as herdsmen. In the late 1st millennium BCE, the reference to this population as Bedouins is questionable. Disparate social ranks in the population contradict the usual lack of ranking within Bedouin tribal groups. Such accumulations of wealth arise more readily in a sedentary than pastoral environment. Not copies of tents, but rather of houses, the heavy stone graves show their makers' value for a sedentary kind of dwelling in the afterlife. Aside from males being supplied with weapons, the grave goods say little about the occupations of the two sexes. Evidently, both men and women spun thread.

This population may be understood as migrants from South Arabia to Oman on the strength of an oral historical account (the Arabic Kashf al-Ghumma), written down centuries after the fact. However, the Kashf contains no real information, aside from a vague plot of Persian dominance and 'Omani Azd' independence. Another reason to believe in a newly arrived population is the contrast of the Late Iron Age material culture with that of the indigenous Early Iron Age population. The Late Iron Age differs in terms of pottery from that distributed in central Oman and in the neighbouring present-day United Arab Emirates. Significantly, razors occur in the Early Iron Age contexts, but not in the succeeding ones. The traditional explanation of a diaspora '2000 years before the coming of Islam ‒ after God had Sabʿāʾ flooded', is apocryphal.

Evidence appears in absolute terms from c. 300 BCE to c. 300 CE to date the relative chronological Samad Late Iron Age. Given the relative small amount of research, it is not possible to prove the transition from the Early Iron Age in absolute terms, which may end as late as 300 BCE. Based on several defective radiocarbon assays, in 2009 Yule rejected his low chronology published in the final report of 2001. Little evidence exists for a social or artefactual chronological development within this period, aside from a seriation of the finds from men's graves. Other artefact assemblages exist parallel to it both in Oman and the United Arab Emirates. The end of the Samad Period is even more obscure than its beginning. A series of megadroughts begin around 500 AD in Arabia, some 200 years after its disappearance.

The Samad Late Iron Age is little researched, based mainly on one excavation report of over 250 graves at the type-site, notwithstanding later re-interpretations. Criticisms of the Samad Late Iron Age are notoriously unreliable, and show a disinterest in find-quantification. New research may easily change the chronology, area of distribution and other basic aspects. On present knowledge, it is easy to question the integrity of the definition of the Samad artefactual assemblage. In 2016, the definition of this assemblage was re-focussed on the finds from Samd and al-Maysar which reduced to area of distribution to some 14.000 km2, north to Muscat, south to Muḍmar East near Adam, east to Ṭīwī, west to Muḍmar.

The Samad Late Iron Age is rarely commented on. Several mentions regarding the archaeology of Central Oman depart from the vantage point of the archaeology of the neighbouring United Arab Emirates. D. Kennet simply links his excavation at Kush (U.A.E.) with sites on Baḥrain and Période préislamique recent sites, to represent all of eastern Arabia from the 3rd cent. BCE to the 8th cent. CE, despite the lack of similarity to Central Oman's LIA characteristics. The increase in the documentation of the Samad assemblage makes this view obsolete.

Decades after several European historians declared Oman to be a colony of Persia, perhaps during the 6th century BCE, the appearance of the Samad Late Iron Age assemblage and the so-called pre-Islamic recent period now are proven at over 80 sites, in contrast to a lack of sites with Persian finds in south-eastern Arabia. Today we have more sophisticated historical models for south-eastern Arabia than simply as an ancient Persian colony over the centuries, which in light of archaeological finds is implausible. In this issue, in the later 1st millennium BCE the ancient weak economic base and small population in Central Oman would have made Central Oman unattractive for an ancient colonial power. Central Oman's main importance seems to have been a strategic one for foreign powers interested in securing their own sea trade and interdicting that of competitors.

By means of the use of linguistics it is possible to get past the limits of the archaeological record and learn something about who the people are who used the artefacts. The Samad sites lie outside the sphere of Arabic language subsequently at the time of the Prophet, but inside the areas where so-called Modern South Arabian languages are spoken. Recently, however, several Hasaitic inscriptions of north Arabian type have come to light in the United Arab Emirates and at other sites further north. The Samad graves and grave goods do not relate to those from contemporary central or south-western Arabia, from whence this population usually is considered to derive. To explain this, we must assume a change from the original material culture of the immigrants to the Samad assemblage as we know it, which perhaps took a couple of generations. The graves and grave goods relate poorly with those of the PIR, with the exception of the shared balsamaria vessels.

The burial custom shows weak evidence in the graves for a monogamous core family structure, perhaps like that of the Mahra tribes. In one grave an older couple are buried. There are no burials with one male and more than one female.

== See also ==
- Archaeology of Oman
- Oman
- Pre-Islamic recent period
- List of archaeological sites by country

== Sources ==
- Paul Yule, Die Gräberfelder in Samad al-Shan (Sultanat Oman): Materialien zu einer Kulturgeschichte, Rahden, 2001, ISBN 3-89646-634-8..
- Paul Yule, Late Pre-Islamic Oman: The Inner Evidence – The Outside View, Hoffmann-Ruf, M.–al-Salami, A. (eds.), Studies on Ibadism and Oman, Oman and Overseas, vol. 2, Hildesheim, 2013, 13–33, ISBN 978-3-487-14798-7.
- Paul Yule, Cross-roads – Early and Late Iron Age South-eastern Arabia, Abhandlungen Deutsche Orient-Gesellschaft, vol. 30, Wiesbaden, 2014, ISBN 978-3-447-10127-1; E-Book: ISBN 978-3-447-19287-3.
- Paul Yule, Valorising the Samad Late Iron Age, Arabian Archaeol. Epigraphy 27, 2016, 31–71, ISSN 0905-7196.
- Paul Yule & Christine Pariselle, Silver phiale said to be from al-Juba (al-Wusṭa governorate) ‒ an archaeological puzzle, Arabian Archaeol. Epigraphy 27, 2016, 153‒65, ISSN 0905-7196
- Paul Yule, Toward an identity of the Samad period population (Sultanate of Oman), Zeitschrift für Orient-Archäologie 11, 2018, 438–86, ISBN 978-3-7861-2829-8, ISSN 1868-9078.
- Paul Yule & Fausto Mauro, At the dawn of history The late pre-Islamic age in south-eastern Arabia, Ministry of Heritage and Tourism, 14, 2025, ISBN 978-1-80327-993-0 10.32028/9781803279930
