= Pre-Islamic recent period =

The Recent Pre-Islamic Period (PIR) in southeastern Arabia refers to the period between 300 BCE, the end of the Iron Age III period, through to the Islamic era which effectively commenced with the culmination of the 7th-century Ridda Wars.

Previously referred to as the Mleiha or Hellenistic era, the period was dominated in the region by the rise of the cities of Ed-Dur, currently located in Umm Al Quwain, UAE and Mleiha in Sharjah. It follows on from the dissolution of Darius III's Persian empire. Although the era has been called Hellenistic, Alexander the Great's conquests went no further than Persia and he left Arabia untouched.

== Archaeology ==
Mleiha attests to two distinctive cultures in the PIR - along with domestic production of ceramics, Greek amphorae have been found dating to between 100 and 300 BCE, but there are also finds of engraved bronze bowls and alabaster-ware, distinctively south-Arabian, and marked both in Aramaic and Hasaitic. Inscriptions mention the ‘King of Oman’, one particularly rich find dated between 214 222 BCE reads, in Aramaic, ‘This is the memorial of Amud, son of Gurr, which built over him his son Amud, son of Amud, year 90 (or 97)’ and then, in Hasaitic, ‘Memorial and tomb of Amud, son of Gurr, son of Ali, inspector of the King of Oman, which built over him his son Amud, son of Amud, son of Gurr, inspector of the King of Oman.’

Mleiha at this time has been linked to Seleucid Persia, the Parthians, Sasanians and the peoples of southern Arabia. It also yields rare evidence of iron production, something almost entirely lacking during the Emirates' three Iron Ages, and there have been finds of nails through to weapons that are clearly of a local origin.

Mleiha is strongly linked to the Ancient Near Eastern city of Ed Dur on the UAE's west coast. Macedonian-style coinage unearthed at Ed-Dur dates back to Alexander the Great. Hundreds of coins were found both there and at Mleiha featuring a head of Heracles and a seated Zeus on the obverse, and bearing the name of Abi'el in Aramaic. These coins match moulds found at Mleiha which, together with finds of slag at the site, suggests the existence of a metallurgical centre. Contemporary Greek manuscripts have given the exports from Ed-Dur as 'pearls, purple dye, clothing, wine, gold and slaves, and a great quantity of dates' and there is a strong history of trade between the coast and the interior. Similarities in burial rituals — of laying animals to rest with their owners — and vessels, decorations and small bronze snake figures have also been unearthed. Camels buried with their heads reversed are a common feature of both the animal burials at Ed-Dur and inland Mleiha.

A trove of some 409 Hellenistic era coins was unearthed, stored in a clay pot, at Mleiha in February 2021. The nine-kilo find was described as 'hugely significant'.

Mleiha represents the most complete evidence of human settlement and community from the post-Iron Age era in the UAE. A thriving agrarian community benefited from the protection of the Mleiha Fort. It was here, and during this period, that the most complete evidence of early iron usage in the UAE has been found, including nails, long swords and arrowheads as well as evidence of slag from smelting.

== The fall of Mleiha ==
There is evidence in the archaeological record of Mleiha that the city and area underwent a great sack at a time contiguous to the rule of the first Sasanian king, Ardashir I, who reigned from 224–240 CE. Pillaged graves and firelines attest to a conflict, but Mleiha had already undergone a period of decline. While both Mleiha and Ed Dur were, in their eflorescence, major centres of regional power and wealth, their decline meant that by 200 CE, both cities had shrunk and occupation appears to have been concentrated around central fortified areas, testament to a long series of conflicts.

Although the Sasanians recorded campaigns against Arabia, they were limited and there was no imposition of direct rule but, in northern Arabia at least, the Sasanians' Lakhmid clients held sway. Evidence of Sasanian artefacts is found at Kush, Khatt, Hulayla and Mleiha but there is scant evidence of any enduring Sasanian occupation of Southeastern Arabia.

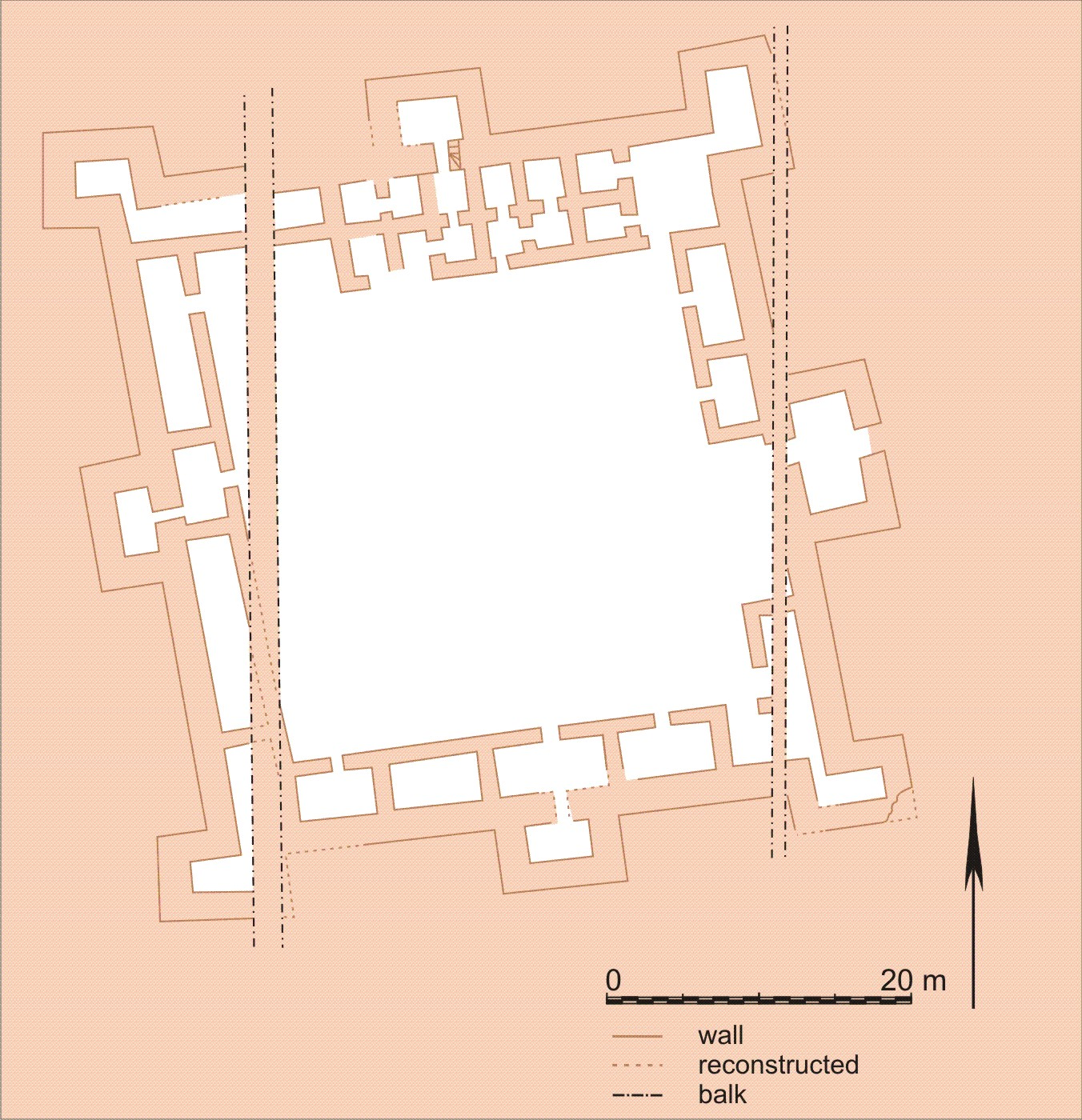
Mlaiha fort CW is important for it contains all of the strata which comprise the PIR chronological sequence.

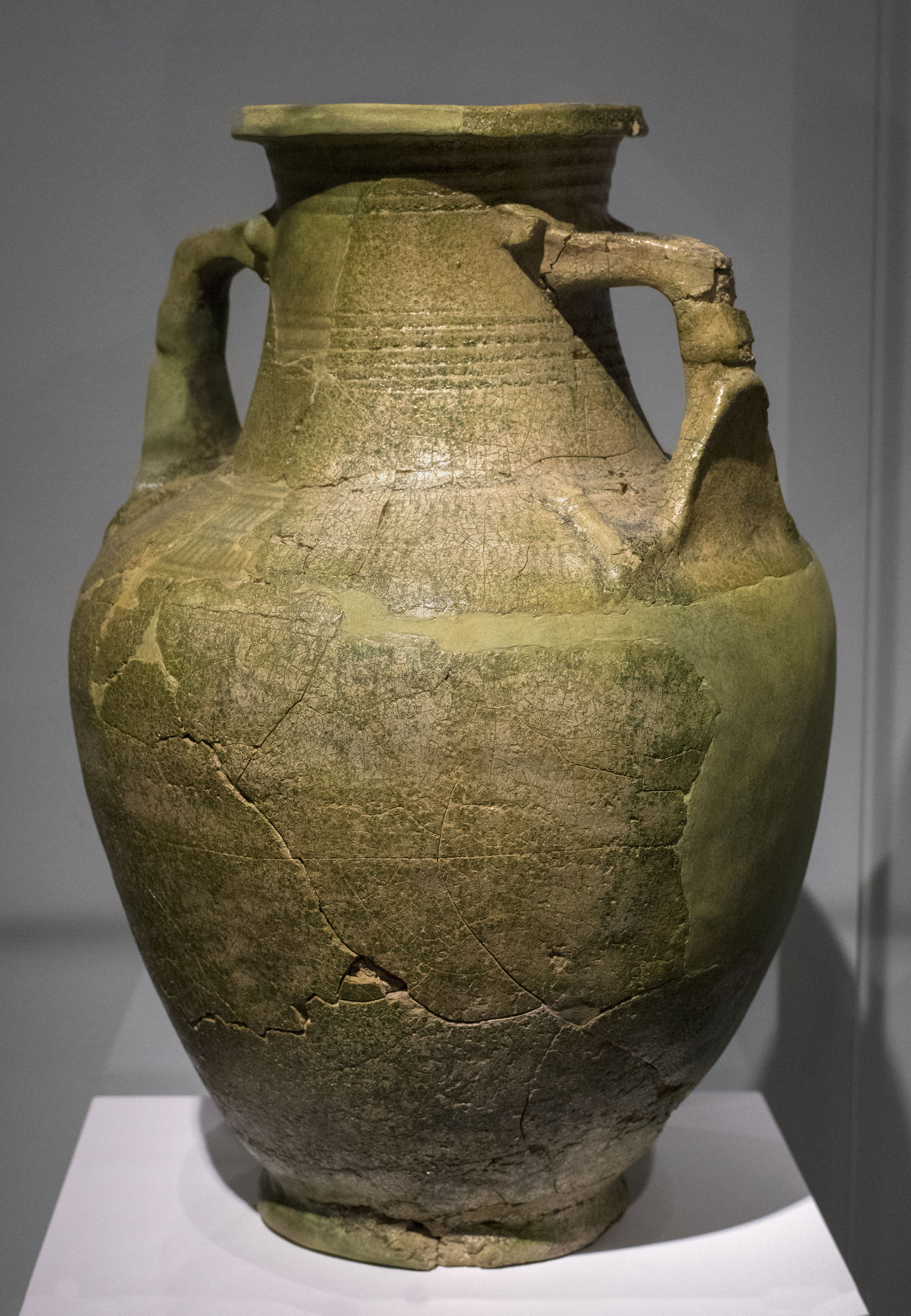
Handled jar excavated from Mlayha and exhibited in the Sharja Museum.

Aside from so-called balsamaria few pottery finds are held in common with the Late Iron Age known at Samad al-Shan in central Oman. While the two assemblages are contemporary, their connections are still little researched. The central Oman site Al Fuwayda, 1 km east of Amlah, resembles in its find spectrum more those of the PIR than the Samad assemblage of central Oman.

== Sources ==
- Michel Mouton, La péninsule d’Oman de la fin de l’âge du fer au début de la période sasanide (250 av. – 350 ap. JC), BAR International Series 1776, 1992 (printed 2008) ISBN 978 1 4073 0264 5.
- Ernie Haerinck, Excavations at ed-Dur (Umm al-Qaiwain, United Arab Emirates, vol. 2: the Tombs, Leuven, 2001, ISBN 90 429 0997 8.
- Paul Yule, Cross-roads – Early and Late Iron Age South-eastern Arabia, Abhandlungen Deutsche Orient-Gesellschaft, vol. 30, Wiesbaden 2014, ISBN 978-3-447-10127-1.
- Paul Yule, Valorising the Samad Late Iron Age, Arabian archaeology and epigraphy 27, 2016, 31‒71 doi:10.11588/propylaeumdok.00004759.
