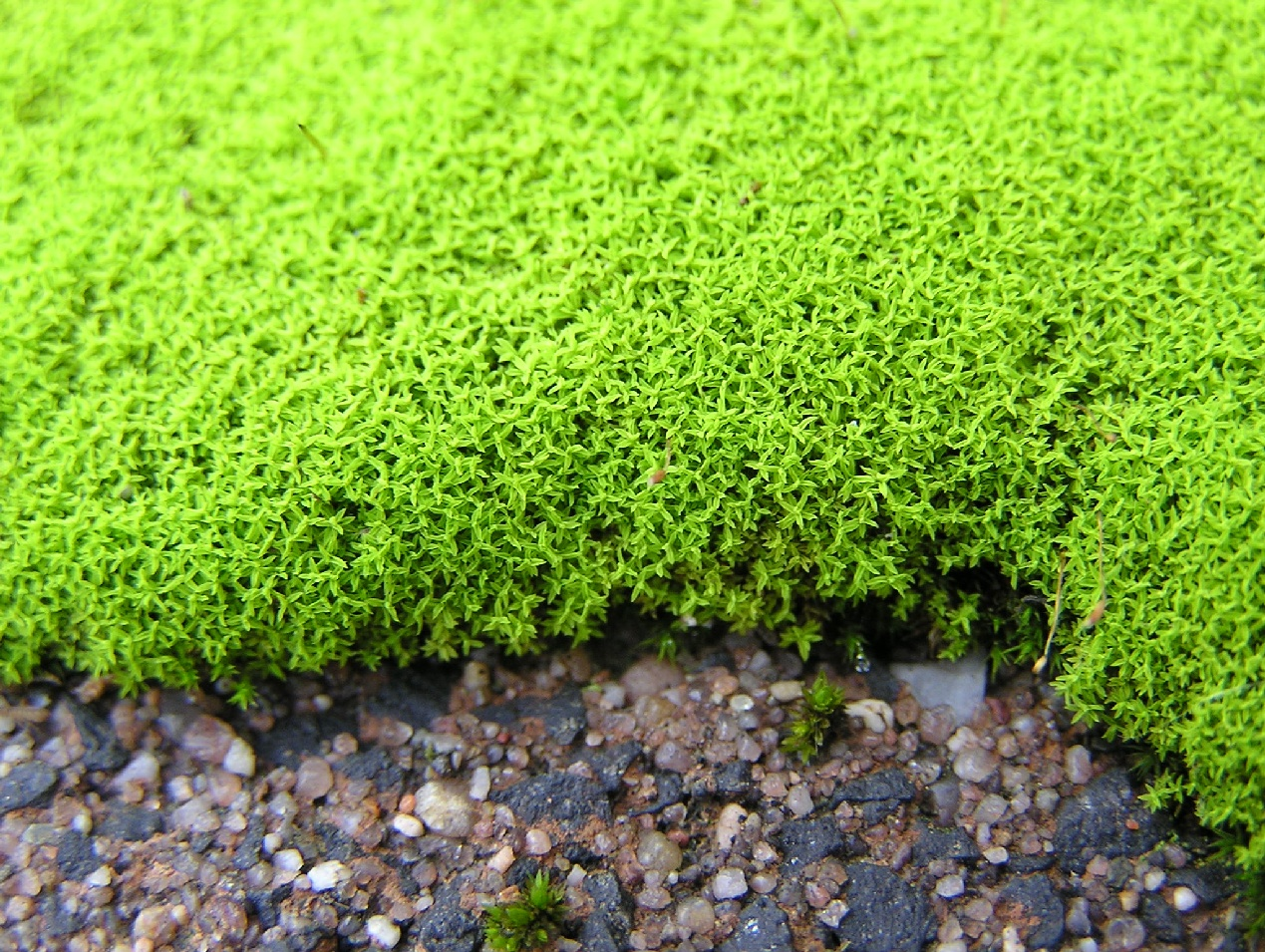
- Barbula convoluta

Scientific classification
- Kingdom: Plantae
- Division: Bryophyta
- Class: Bryopsida
- Subclass: Dicranidae
- Order: Pottiales
- Family: Pottiaceae
- Genus: Barbula; Hedw.

= Barbula =

Genus of mosses

Barbula is a genus of mosses in the family Pottiaceae.

== Species ==
The following species are recognised in the genus Barbula:

- Barbula afrofontana (Müll. Hal.) Broth.
- Barbula alpicola Müll. Hal.
- Barbula altipapillosa E.B. Bartram
- Barbula amplexifolia (Mitt.) A. Jaeger
- Barbula anastomosans Müll. Hal.
- Barbula anceps Cardot
- Barbula appressifolia (Mitt.) A. Jaeger
- Barbula aquatica Cardot & Thér.
- Barbula arctoamericana Müll. Hal.
- Barbula arcuata Griff.
- Barbula aureola Müll. Hal.
- Barbula austrogracilis Dusén
- Barbula bagelensis M. Fleisch.
- Barbula bicolor (Bruch & Schimp.) Lindb.
- Barbula bolleana (Müll. Hal.) Broth.
- Barbula brachymenia (Mitt.) A. Jaeger
- Barbula bulbiformis Brid.
- Barbula calycina Schwägr.
- Barbula calyculosa (Mitt.) A. Jaeger
- Barbula capillipes Broth.
- Barbula chenia Redf. & B.C. Tan
- Barbula chocayensis Broth. & Herzog
- Barbula clavicostata (Renauld & Cardot) R.H. Zander
- Barbula confertifolia Mitt.
- Barbula congoana Thér.
- Barbula consanguinea (Thwaites & Mitt.) A. Jaeger
- Barbula convoluta Hedw.
- Barbula coreensis (Cardot) K. Saito
- Barbula costata (Mitt.) A. Jaeger
- Barbula costesii Thér.
- Barbula crocea (Brid.) F. Weber & D. Mohr
- Barbula crozalsii (H. Philib.) Broth.
- Barbula cucullata J. Froehl.
- Barbula cylindrangia Müll. Hal.
- Barbula declivium Müll. Hal.
- Barbula dharwarensis Dixon
- Barbula dioritica Müll. Hal.
- Barbula dissita Müll. Hal.
- Barbula dixoniana (P.C. Chen) Redf. & B.C. Tan
- Barbula dorrii Renauld & Cardot
- Barbula dusenii Müll. Hal. ex Broth.
- Barbula ehrenbergii (Lorentz) M. Fleisch.
- Barbula enderesii Garov.
- Barbula eubryum Müll. Hal.
- Barbula farriae H.A. Crum & E.B. Bartram
- Barbula fendleri Müll. Hal.
- Barbula fidelis H.A. Crum & Steere
- Barbula flavicans D.G. Long
- Barbula francii Thér.
- Barbula frigida Müll. Hal.
- Barbula funalis Dixon & Badhw.
- Barbula furvofusca Müll. Hal.
- Barbula fuscoviridis Broth. ex Thér.
- Barbula geminata Müll. Hal.
- Barbula glaucescens Hampe
- Barbula glaucula Müll. Hal.
- Barbula gracilenta Mitt.
- Barbula gracillima (Herzog) Broth.
- Barbula grimmiacea Müll. Hal.
- Barbula gymnostoma Müll. Hal.
- Barbula hampeana Paris
- Barbula hiroshii K. Saito
- Barbula hispaniolensis W.R. Buck & Steere
- Barbula hosseusii Thér.
- Barbula hyalinobasis Broth.
- Barbula hymenostylioides Broth.
- Barbula inclinans Schimp. ex Besch.
- Barbula indica (Hook.) Spreng.
- Barbula integrifolia (R.S. Williams) R.H. Zander
- Barbula isoindica R.H. Zander
- Barbula jacutica Ignatova
- Barbula janjaninica O'Shea
- Barbula javanica Dozy & Molk.
- Barbula juniperoidea Müll. Hal.
- Barbula kiaeri Broth.
- Barbula lamprocalyx Müll. Hal.
- Barbula laureriana Lorentz
- Barbula lavardei (Thér.) R.H. Zander & S.P. Churchill
- Barbula leiophylla Tixier
- Barbula leucobasis Dixon
- Barbula leucodontoides (Gangulee) Gangulee
- Barbula lonchodonta Müll. Hal.
- Barbula lurida Hornsch.
- Barbula macassarensis M. Fleisch.
- Barbula majuscula Müll. Hal.
- Barbula malagana H.A. Crum
- Barbula marginans Müll. Hal.
- Barbula marginatula Gangulee
- Barbula meidensis Cufod.
- Barbula microcalycina Magill
- Barbula munyensis R.S. Williams
- Barbula novae-caledoniae Müll. Hal.
- Barbula novogranatensis Hampe
- Barbula novoguinensis Broth.
- Barbula occidentalis (Mitt.) Broth.
- Barbula orizabensis Müll. Hal.
- Barbula pachyloma Broth.
- Barbula perlinearis Müll. Hal.
- Barbula pernana Müll. Hal.
- Barbula pertorquescens Broth.
- Barbula peruviana (Mitt.) A. Jaeger
- Barbula pflanzii (Broth.) Herzog
- Barbula plebeja Müll. Hal.
- Barbula potaninii Broth. ex Müll. Hal.
- Barbula pseudoehrenbergii M. Fleisch.
- Barbula pseudonigrescens Tixier
- Barbula punae Herzog
- Barbula purpurascens Dusén
- Barbula pycnophylla Cardot
- Barbula pygmaea Müll. Hal.
- Barbula rechingeri Broth.
- Barbula riograndensis E.B. Bartram
- Barbula riparia Müll. Hal.
- Barbula robbinsii E.B. Bartram
- Barbula rothii Herzog
- Barbula rubriseta E.B. Bartram
- Barbula salisburiensis Dixon
- Barbula sambakiana Broth.
- Barbula satoi (Sakurai) S. He
- Barbula scleromitra Besch.
- Barbula semilimbata Dixon & Luisier
- Barbula semirosulata R.H. Zander
- Barbula seramensis H. Akiyama
- Barbula singkarakensis Baumgartner & J. Froehl.
- Barbula somaliae Müll. Hal.
- Barbula sordida Besch.
- Barbula spathulifolia (Dixon & P. de la Varde) R.H. Zander
- Barbula speirostega Müll. Hal.
- Barbula stenocarpa Hampe
- Barbula subcalycina Müll. Hal.
- Barbula subcernua Schimp.
- Barbula subcespitosa (Hampe) Broth.
- Barbula subcomosa Broth.
- Barbula subdenticulata Dixon.
- Barbula subglaucescens Müll. Hal.
- Barbula subgrimmiacea Thér.
- Barbula subobtusa Thér.
- Barbula subpellucida Mitt.
- Barbula subreflexifolia Müll. Hal.
- Barbula subreplicata Broth.
- Barbula subrufa Broth. ex Müll. Hal.
- Barbula subruncinata Müll. Hal.
- Barbula sumatrana Baumgartner & Dixon
- Barbula swartziana Müll. Hal.
- Barbula tenuicoma Müll. Hal. ex Broth.
- Barbula tenuirostris Brid.
- Barbula thelimitria Müll. Hal.
- Barbula tisserantii (P. de la Varde) P. de la Varde
- Barbula tortelloides Müll. Hal.
- Barbula translucens Salzm. ex Bruch
- Barbula trichomanoides Broth. ex Ihsiba
- Barbula tuberculosa (Renauld & Paris) Cardot
- Barbula umtaliensis Magill
- Barbula uncinicoma Müll. Hal.
- Barbula unguiculata Hedw.
- Barbula unguiculatula Müll. Hal.
- Barbula vaginata Warnst.
- Barbula vardei R.S. Chopra
- Barbula ventanica Müll. Hal.
- Barbula vulcanica Lorentz
- Barbula williamsii (P.C. Chen) Z. Iwats. & B.C. Tan
- Barbula zambesiaca Magill
- Barbula zennoskeana B.C. Tan
