= Paul Alan Yule =

German anthropologist

- Occupations: Archaeologist, academic
- Known for: Excavations at Zafar, capital of the Himyarite Kingdom (1998–2010); Research on Samad al-Shan and the late pre-Islamic Iron Age of south-eastern Arabia; Study of the Copper Hoard Culture of India; Excavation at Mifsas Bahri, Tigray (2013–2016)

Academic background
- Education: University of Minnesota (BA, 1969); New York University (MA, 1974; PhD, 1979); Marburg University (1975–1979); Heidelberg University (habilitation, 1995)

Academic work
- Discipline: Archaeology
- Sub-discipline: Archaeology of Oman; Archaeology of Yemen; Archaeology of India
- Notable works: Early Cretan Seals (1981); The Bronze Age Metalwork of India (1985); Late Antique Arabia: Ẓafār, Capital of Ḥimyar (2013); At the dawn of history The late pre-Islamic age in south-eastern Arabia (2025)

Paul Alan Yule is a German archaeologist at the Ruprecht-Karls-Universität Heidelberg (habilitation). His work targets the archaeology of Oman, Yemen, previously India.

== Early life and education ==
Yule studied at the University of Minnesota (BA, 1969), New York University (MA, 1974; PhD, 1979), and Marburg University (1975–79). His dissertation, Early Cretan Seals, classified and dated the seals from the Early and Middle Bronze Ages of Minoan Crete. In 1995, Yule completed his habilitation at Heidelberg University a post-doctoral qualification in the German academic system that serves as the formal licence to hold a professorship.

== Academic career ==
His habilitation thesis analysed 365 pre-Islamic graves in eastern and central Oman. According to an independent biographical reference, he lectured in Oriental studies at the University of Bonn (1985–86) and served as field director, later co-director, of the German Archaeological Mission to the Sultanate of Oman from 1987 to 1996. He held a series of sequential, at times overlapping, positions at Heidelberg University, funded through foundation money administered by the university. Following his appointment as ''Außerplanmäßiger'' Professor in 2004, he continued in that role until his retirement in 2012 and continued teaching there until 2015. He is a corresponding member of the German Archaeological Institute (from 2007). He has contributed articles and reviews to journals including Antiquity, the Journal of the American Oriental Society, Journal of Oman Studies and Arabian Archaeology and Epigraphy, and has served as co-editor of the journal Nubica.

== Open access and digital archiving ==
Yule has worked within the framework of the open access movement, archiving his research materials and publications through the image database heidICON and the digital repository Propylaeum-Dok at Heidelberg University Library. Since 2005, he has developed 3D recording and animation techniques in India and Oman in collaboration with the Fachhochschule Mainz (i3mainz) and Laura Pecchioli.

== Research ==
=== South Asian ===
In the 1980s, with the support of Swami Omanand Saraswati, he catalogued and evaluated metallic artefacts of the so-called Copper Hoard Culture by means of European methods and models for the first time, whereby numerous finds came to light especially in the Kanya Gurukul in Narela Haryana. The artefacts show little evidence of use-wear, suggesting they may have served ritual purposes or been deliberately deposited rather than used as tools.

In Odisha, Yule published finds from a metals-period cemetery at Sankarjang, including an object he has proposed as one of the earliest musical instruments found in India. He also documented the early historic fortress at Sisupalgarh using laser scanning, ground-penetrating radar, and GPS survey. Together with Corinna Borchert, he reported illegal construction activity within the protected Mauryan era site. From 2001 to 2004, Yule documented "mud forts" and other archaeological sites in Odisha along the Mahanadi River and in Chhattisgarh; this work is catalogued in the heidICON image database.

=== Arabian and East African research ===
From 1982 to 1987 Yule worked as a volunteer at the Deutsches Bergbau-Museum in Bochum alongside Gerd Weisgerber, researching the prehistory of Oman.He catalogued a metal hoard from Ibri-Selme, later published jointly with Weisgerber as a typological study of what they then described as the largest known hoard of metallic artefacts in the Near East, found in an Umm an-Nar-period communal tomb and dated to the Early Iron Age.

In 1987 Yule began habilitation research on the site of Samad al-Shan which provides evidence about the late pre-Islamic population of eastern Oman from approximately 300 BCE– 250 CE. His work introduced alphanumeric classification codes for site and artefact types to support computer processing. In the mid-1990s, Yule and Weisgerber mapped and studied the tower tombs of Jaylah in the eastern Hajjar mountains, tentatively dated to the Umm an-Nar period (mid-to-late third millennium BCE). Yule has proposed a framework distinguishing Early and Late Iron Ages in southeastern Arabia, describing two regional variants of the Late pre-Islamic period: the Samad Late Iron Age, and the période préislamique récente, the latter studied primarily by French and Belgian researchers in the United Arab Emirates.

=== Yemen: Zafar and the Himyarite kingdom ===
From 1998 to 2010, Yule directed field research at Zafar, capital of the Himyarite Tribal Confederation in the Yemeni highlands. The excavation examined material culture from the Himyarite period (110 BCE–525 CE), including a 1.70-metre relief statue of a crowned figure that has been interpreted as a possible Christian or Aksumite king. Yule has argued that the excavated material mitigates earlier characterisations of Himyarite visual culture as artistically in decline.

=== Ethiopia and East Africa ===
In 2013 Steffen Wenig asked Yule to participate in an excavation project of a church at Mifsas Bahri in the South Tigray Region. Yule continued this research independently from 2014 to 2016 with funding from the German Research Foundation (DFG), focusing on a Late Aksumite church ruin dated to the 7th century CE.

== Selected publications ==
- Early Cretan Seals: A Study of Chronology (Mainz: Philipp von Zabern, 1981).doi:10.11588/diglit.3044
- The Bronze Age Metalwork of India. Prähistorische Bronzefunde XX.8 (Munich: Beck, 1985).ISBN 3-406-30440-0
- Die Gräberfelder in Samad al-Shān (Sultanat Oman): Materialien zu einer Kulturgeschichte. Orient-Archäologie 4, 2 vols. (Rahden: Verlag Marie Leidorf, 2001).ISBN 978-3-896-46634-1
- The Metal Hoard from ʿIbrī/Selme, Sultanate of Oman. Prähistorische Bronzefunde XX.7 (Stuttgart: Franz Steiner Verlag, 2001).ISBN 978-3-515-07153-6
- Late Antique Arabia: Ẓafār, Capital of Ḥimyar (Wiesbaden: Harrassowitz, 2013).doi:10.15460/aethiopica.17.1.872
- Mifsas Baḥri, a Late Aksumite Frontier Community in the Mountains of Tigray. BAR International Series S2839 (2017).ISBN 9781407315799
- Early Iron Age Metal-Working Workshop in the Empty Quarter, Sultanate of Oman. (Bonn: Habelt, 2018).ISBN 978-3-7749-4112-0
- The Late Pre-Islamic Age in South-eastern Arabia (Oxford: Archaeopress, 2025).doi:10.32028/9781803279930
- The Early Iron Age Metal Hoard from the Al Khawd Area (Sultan Qaboos University) Sultanate of Oman, vol. 7 (2021).doi:10.2307/j.ctv26bgx0n
- P. Yule ‒ F. Mauro, At the dawn of history The late pre-Islamic age in south-eastern Arabia, Archaeopress: Ministry of Heritage and Tourism, vol. 14, (2025) ISBN 978-1-80327-993-0.
