= Masirah (disambiguation) =

Masirah may refer to:

- Masirah Island
- Masirah Channel
- Gulf of Masirah
- Al-Masirah
