= List of places depicted in the Mao Kun map =

15th-century sailing map from China to India, Arabia, and Africa

Mao Kun map
- Also known as: Zheng He's Navigation Map
- Type: sailing chart included in the military treatise Wubei Zhi
- Date: early 15th-century
- Place of origin: Ming China
- Language: Chinese
- Compiled by: Mao Yuanyi
- Material: paper
- Size: 40 pages (originally, a 20.5 cm by 560 cm strip map)
- Contents: sailing map from China to India, Arabia, and Africa
- Previously kept: library of Mao Kun
- Discovered: Fujian?

The Mao Kun map is a set of navigation charts published in the Ming dynasty military treatise Wubei Zhi. It depicts the geography of eastern China, southeast and southern Asia, Arabia, and eastern Africa. Along the way, it includes Chinese labels of 570 islands, towns, and other places.

Some locations in China are easily identified, as their names have not changed over the centuries. Farther west, the identity of locations marked on the map become more difficult to determine. This list includes the most likely candidates for each map label. This list has been largely produced based on the findings by J.V.G Mills and published in 1970. However, in the last fifty years and especially in the last thirty years, Chinese, Asian and African historians have accessed new archaeological, archival and ethnographic data that has found some of these Mills' toponyms to be changed.

== Yangtze River ==
Label	Pinyin	Translation	Location	Country/Province	Page
菜園	láiyuán	vegetable garden	oil and hemp for shipbuilding	Jiangsu	1
自寶船廠開船從龍江關出水直抵外國諸番圖	Zì bǎochuánchǎng kāi chuán cóng lóngjiāng guān chūshuǐ zhídǐ wàiguó zhū fān tú	Sailing from the Treasure-Ship Shipyard, departing from Longjiang Channel to various foreign countries	--	--	1
太子州	Dàqiānzhōu	Heir Apparent Island	Jiangxin Island	Jiangsu	1
五屑橋 (瓦屑橋)	Wǔxièqiáo	Five Fragments Bridge (Tile Fragments Bridge)	near Jiangdongmen? 32.0383°N 118.7333°E	Jiangsu	1
寶船廠	Bǎochuánchǎng	Treasure-Ship Shipyard	Zheng_He#Treasure_Shipyard_excavation 32.0636°N 118.7291°E	Jiangsu	1
石城橋	Shíchéngqiáo	Stone Wall Bridge	Hanximen	Jiangsu	1
龍江關	Longjiangguan	Dragon River Passage	Xiaguan	Jiangsu	1
段腰	Duànyāo	Segment Waist	sandbar northeast of Jiangxin	Jiangsu	1
抽分廠	Chōufēnchǎng	"Extract Fraction" Factory	Tax Depot	Jiangsu	1
宣課司	Xuānkèsī	Propaganda Department	near Longjiang Road?	Jiangsu	1
水西橋	Shuǐxīqiáo	Water West Gate	Sanshan Gate	Jiangsu	1
淨海寺	Jìnghǎisì	Temple of Calm Seas	Jinghai Temple	Jiangsu	1
天妃宮	Tiānfēigōng	Temple of the Celestial Spouse	Tianfei Temple	Jiangsu	1
祭祀壇	jìsìtán	sacrificial altar	outside Jinchuan Gate	Jiangsu	1
獅子山	Shīzishān	Lion Mountain	Shizishan	Jiangsu	1
水驛	shuǐyì	maritime post office	riverside, outside Jinchuan Gate	Jiangsu	1
浦子口	Pǔzǐkou	Riverside Mouth	Pukou	Jiangsu	2
皇城	Huángchéng	Imperial City	Ming Palace	Jiangsu	2
中和橋	Zhōnghéqiáo	Center Sum Bridge	Zhonghe Bridge	Jiangsu	2
復城橋	Fùchéngqiáo	Reply City Bridge	Fuchengli	Jiangsu	2
天地壇	Tiāndìtán	Altar of Heaven and Earth	outside Guanghuamen	Jiangsu	2
鐘山	Zhōngshān	Bell Mountain	Purple Mountain	Jiangsu	2
石灰山	Shíhuīshān	Lime Mountain	Mufushan	Jiangsu	2
通江橋	Tōngjiāngqiáo	Through River Bridge	outside the gate of Zhuojinshang, wher Baobanchang Shipbuilding Lake once was	Jiangsu	2
方山	Fāngshān	Square Mountain	Fangshan	Jiangsu	2
靈山橋	Língshānqiáo	Spirit Mountain Bridge	Lingshangen Village	Jiangsu	2
覬音山	Jìyīnshān	Coveted Sound Mountain	Badou Mountain?	Jiangsu	2
觀音門	Guānyīnmén	Observed Sound Mountain	Guanyin Gate	Jiangsu	2
燕子磯	Yànzijī	Swallow Rock	Yanziji Village	Jiangsu	2
龍潭	Lóngtán	Dragon Pond	Longtan Street, Qixia District	Jiangsu	2
斬龍廟	Zhǎnlóngmiào	Beheaded Dragon Temple	Qingshan riverside	Jiangsu	3
高子港	Gāozǐgǎng	Tall Child Port	Gaozi	Jiangsu	3
礬山	Fánshān	Alum Mountain	Yanshan	Jiangsu	3
天寧州	Tiānníngzhōu	Island of Heavenly Peace	Jing'an Residential District	Jiangsu	3
儀真	Yízhēn	Instrument of Truth	Yizhen	Jiangsu	3
鎮江	Zhènjiāng	Town River	Zhenjiang Town	Jiangsu	3
金山	Jīnshān	Gold Mountain	Jinshan	Jiangsu	3
丹徒	Dāntú	Red Only	Dantu Town	Jiangsu	3
瓜洲	Guāzhōu	Melon Island	Guazhou	Jiangsu	3
焦山	Jiāoshān	Burnt Mountain	Jiaoshan	Jiangsu	3
大港	Dàgǎng	Big Harbor	Dagang Port Area	Jiangsu	3
圌山	Chuíshān	Round Mountain	Chuishan	Jiangsu	4
江陰縣	Jiāngyīnxiàn	River Shade County	Jiangyin	Jiangsu	4
石牌灣	Shípáiwān	Stone Plate Bay	Baiqu Port	Jiangsu	4
淺沙	qiǎnshā	shallow shoals		Jiangsu	4
香山	Xiāngshān	Fragrant Hill	Fragrance Hill Scenic Area	Jiangsu	4
西鞋山	Xīxiéshān	West Boot Island	Gushanzhen	Jiangsu	4
天妃宫	Tiānfēigōng	Temple of the Celestial Spouse	Huangtian Port	Jiangsu	4
東鞋山	Dōngxiéshān	East Boot Island		Jiangsu	4
巡司	xúnsī	inspectorate		Jiangsu	4
石頭港	Shítougǎng	Stone Head Port	Zhangjiagang	Jiangsu	4
龍王廟	Lóngwángmiào	Dragon King Temple	Kunshan	Jiangsu	5
巡司	xúnsī	inspectorate		Jiangsu	5
蔡港	Càigǎng	Weedy Port	near Meili Village?	Jiangsu	5
白茅港	Báimáogǎng	White Thatch Port	Baimaokou	Jiangsu	5
福山廟	Fúshānmiào	Fortune Mountain Temple	Fushan Temple	Jiangsu	5
太倉衛	Tàicāngwèi	Supreme Warehouse Guard	Taicang	Jiangsu	5
宝山	Bǎoshān	Treasure Mountain	Baoshan	Shanghai	5
天妃宫	Tiānfēigōng	Temple of the Celestial Spouse	Tianfei Palace in Liuhe	Jiangsu	6
崇明州	Chóngmíngzhōu	Worship Bright Island	Chongming Island	Shanghai	6
吳淞江	Wúsōngjiāng	variation of Pine River	Huangpu River	Shanghai	6
淺沙	qiǎnshā	shallow sand		Shanghai	6
胡椒沙	hújiāoshā	peppery sand		Shanghai	6
招寶山	Zhāobǎoshān	Recruit Treasure Mountain	in Gaoqiao, formerly part of Baoshan County	Shanghai	6
青村所	Qīngcūnsuǒ	Green Village Battalion	Qingcun Town	Shanghai	6
銖翎沙	Zhūlíngshā	Cent Feathers Sand		Shanghai	6
南匯嘴	Nánhuìzuǐ	South Exchange Mouth	Nanhuizui	Shanghai	6

== China Coast ==
Label	Pinyin	Translation	Location	Country/Province	Page
茶山	Cháshān	Tea Island	Sheshan Island	Shanghai	6
金沙衛	Jīnshāwèi	Gold Sand Guard	Jinsha Village	Zhejiang	6
大七	Dàqī	Big Seven	Gutzlaff Island	Zhejiang	6
乍浦	Zhàpǔ	First Riverside	Zhapu	Zhejiang	6
海寧衛	Hǎiníngwèi	Sea Tranquility Guard	Haining	Zhejiang	7
小七	Xiǎoqī	Small Seven	Jinshan Mountain	Zhejiang	7
觀海衛	Guānhǎiwèi	Watch Sea Guard	Guanhaiwei Town	Zhejiang	7
湯山	Tāngshān	Soup Island	Dayang Mountain	Zhejiang	7
靈山衛	Língshānwèi	Spirit Mountain Guard	Lingshan Village	Zhejiang	7
許山	Xǔshān	Promise Mountain	half of Tanhu Island	Zhejiang	7
青嶼	Qīngyǔ	Green Island	Qingyu Islet	Zhejiang	7
尼山	Níshān	Nun Island	Dayushan Island	Zhejiang	7
灘山	Tānshān	Beach Island	half of Tanhu Island	Zhejiang	7
定海衛	Dìnghǎiwèi	Set Sea Guard	Zhenhai District	Zhejiang	7
昌國所	Chāngguósuǒ	Prosperous Country Military Station	Zhoushan City	Zhejiang	7
列港	Liègǎng	Line Anchorage	Ligang Town	Zhejiang	7
川山	Chuānshān	River Mountain	Chuanshan Town	Zhejiang	7
東霍山	Dōnghuòshān	East Sudden Mountain	Donghuo Island	Zhejiang	7
西後門	Xīhòumén	West Back Channel	Xihoumen	Zhejiang	7
廟州門	Miàozhōumén	Temple Island Channel	the channel between Yangxiaomao (Roundabout) Island and the coast	Zhejiang	7
普陀山	Pǔtuóshān	General's Bank Island	Mount Putuo	Zhejiang	7
巡检司	xúnjiǎnsī	inspection department	on Qitou (Ketow) peninsula?	Zhejiang	8
大磨山	Dàmóshān	Big Mill Island	Damao Island	Zhejiang	8
孝順洋	Xiàoshùnyáng	Filial Piety Ocean	Xiaoshan Ocean	Zhejiang	8
小磨山	Xiǎomóshān	Small Mill Island	Xiaomaoshan	Zhejiang	8
雙嶼門	Shuāngyǔmén	Double Island Channel	Shuangyu Channel (seaward edge)	Zhejiang	8
崎頭	Qítóu	Steep Head	Qitou Ocean	Zhejiang	8
雙嶼門	Shuāngyǔmén	Double Island Channel	Shuangyu Channel (landward edge)	Zhejiang	8
昇羅嶼	Shēngluóyǔ	Liter Net Island	Shengluo Yuanshan	Zhejiang	8
九山	Jiǔshān	Nine Islands	Jiushan Archipelago	Zhejiang	8
孛渡	Bèidù	Change Ferry	Fodu Island	Zhejiang	8
東廚	Dōngchú	East Kitchen	Dongyushan	Zhejiang	8
西㕑	Xīchú	West Kitchen	Xiyushan	Zhejiang	8
東嶼	Dōngyǔ	East Island	Liuhengdao	Zhejiang	8
郭巨千戶所	Guōjùqiānhùsuǒ	Giant City Wall Battalion	Juexi	Zhejiang	8
砙礁洋	Wǎjiāoyáng	Big Brick Reef Ocean	Chaos Reef	Zhejiang	8
大麵山	Dàmiànshān	Big Flour Island	Damao Island	Zhejiang	8
昌國千戶所	Chāngguóqiānhùsuǒ	Prosperous Country Battalion Headquarters	Jiujing Village	Zhejiang	8
大嵩千戶所	Dàsōngqiānhùsuǒ	Big Sublime Battalion Headquarters	Dasong'aocun	Zhejiang	9
檀頭山	Tántóushān	Sandalwood Head Island	Tantoushan Island	Zhejiang	9
東門所	Dōngménsuǒ	East Channel Battalion	Shipu Town	Zhejiang	9
東門山	Dōngménshān	East Channel Island	Dongmen Island	Zhejiang	9
昌國衛	Chāngguówèi	Prosperous Country Guard	near Shipu?	Zhejiang	9
東西岳山	Dōngxīyuèshān (Dōngxīqíshān)	East & West Mountainous Islands	Dongji Archipelago	Zhejiang	9
牡安千戶所	Mǔānqiānhùsuǒ	Male Peace Battalion Headquarters	Qiansuo	Zhejiang	9
三母山	Sānmǔshān	Three Mothers Island	Shangdachen Island	Zhejiang	9
台州衛	Táizhōuwèi	Table Prefecture Guard	Linhai	Zhejiang	9
江片礁	Jiāngpiànjiāo	River Sheet Reef		Zhejiang	9
魚山	Yúshān	Fish Island	Yushan Islands	Zhejiang	9
羊琪山	Yángqíshān	Sheep Jade Island	Yangqi Island	Zhejiang	9
大陳山	Dàchénshān	Big Old Island	Xiadachen Island	Zhejiang	9
海門衛	Hǎiménwèi	Sea Gate Guard	Haimen Town	Zhejiang	9
大佛頭山	Dàfótóushān	Big Buddha Head Island	Hua'ao Island	Zhejiang	9
黄礁山	Huángjiāoshān	Yellow Reef Island	Huangjiao Island	Zhejiang	9
直谷	Zhígǔ	Straight Valley	Jigu Island	Zhejiang	10
石塘	Shítáng	Stone Pond	Niushan Island	Zhejiang	10
松門衛	Sōngménwèi	Pine Gate Guard	Songmen Town	Zhejiang	10
大小六經山	Dàxiǎoliùjīngshān	Great & Lesser Six Channel Island	Dalu Island	Zhejiang	10
狹山	Xiáshān	Narrow Island	Pishan Island	Zhejiang	10
錢山	Qiánshān	Money Island	Xiaqianshan Island	Zhejiang	10
虎斗	Hǔdòu	Tiger Fight	Hutou Islet	Zhejiang	10
喜鵲山	Xǐquèshān	Magpie Island	Xiqiaoshan?	Zhejiang	10
盤石衛	Pánshíwèi	Plate Rock Guard	Panshi Town	Zhejiang	10
黄山	Huángshān	Yellow Island	Banpingdao	Zhejiang	10
中界山	Zhōngjièshān	Center Boundary Island	Dongtou Island	Zhejiang	10
夜了山	Yèleshān	Night Island	Nance Island	Zhejiang	11
瑞安	Ruì'ān	Lucky Peace	Rui'an City	Zhejiang	11
東洛山	Dōngluòshān	Eastern Island of the Luo River	Beiji Island	Zhejiang	11
溫州衛	Wēnzhōuwèi	Warm Land Guard	Wenzhou City	Zhejiang	11
鹿屏山	Lùpíngshān	Deer Screen Island	Beilong Island	Zhejiang	11
平陽衛	Píngyángwèi	Level Positive Guard	Pingyang County	Zhejiang	11
鳳凰山	Fènghuángshān	Phoenix Island	Phoenix Island	Zhejiang	11
南己山	Nánjǐshān	South Self Island	Nanji Island	Zhejiang	11
西礁	Xījiāo	West Reef	Turret Islet	Zhejiang	11
金鄉衛	Jīnxiāngwèi	Gold Village Guard	Jinxiang Town	Zhejiang	12
南船礁	Nánchuánjiāo	South Boat Reef	Castellated Rock	Zhejiang	12
虎礁	Hǔjiāo	Tiger Reef	Qixing Islands	Zhejiang	12
礁	jiāo	reef		Zhejiang	12
壯士千戶所	Zhuàngshìqiānhùsuǒ	Strong Man Battalion Headquarters	in Cangnan County	Zhejiang	12
石帆	Shífān	Stone Sail	Beiguan Island	Zhejiang	12
臺山	Táishān	Station Island	Taishan Island	Fujian	12
礁	jiāo	reef	Dongxing Island	Fujian	12
洋礁	Yángjiāo	ocean reef	Nanyu Islet	Fujian	12
俞山	Yúshān	Yes Island	Dayushan	Fujian	12
東乗	Dōngchéng	East Mount	Nanshuang Island	Fujian	12
滿門千戶所	Mǎnménqiānhùsuǒ	Full Door Battalion Headquarters		Fujian	12
西乗	Xīchéng	West Mount	Beishuang Island	Fujian	12
福寧衛	Fúníngwèi	Fortunate Tranquility Guard	Funing	Fujian	12
大金巡司	Dàjīnxúnsī	Big Gold Inspectorate	Dajing Castle	Fujian	13
芙蓉山	Fúróngshān	Lotus Island	Fuying Island	Fujian	13
洪山	Hóngshān	Vast Island	Xiyang Island	Fujian	13
筆架山	Bǐjiàshān	Pen Rack Island	Wuyu Islet	Fujian	13
小西洋	Xiǎoxīyáng	Small Western Ocean	Huangwan Island	Fujian	13
芥菜礁	Jiècàijiāo	Mustard Reef		Fujian?	13
大金門	Dàjīnmén	Big Gold Channel	Kemen Waterway	Fujian	13
東湧山	Dōngyǒngshān	Eastern Surge Island	Dongyin Island	Taiwan	13
定海衛	Dìnghǎiwèi	Fixed Sea Guard	on Dongchong Peninsula?	Fujian	13
龜嶼	Guīyǔ	Turtle Island	Dongsha Island	Taiwan	13
北交頭門	Běijiāotóumén	Northern Crossing Head Channel	the passage between Beilingisjiao and Beixu (Yangyu Island), 26º 22' N	Fujian	13
北交	Běijiāotóumén	Northern Grossing	Beijiao Village	Fujian	13
連江衛	Liánjiāngwèi	Connecting River Guard	Lianjiang County	Fujian	13
定海所	Dìnghǎisuǒ	Fixed Sea Battalion	Dinghai Ancient City	Fujian	13
天地	Tiāndì	Heaven and Earth		Fujian	14
古山	Gǔshān	Old Mountain	Mount Gu	Fujian	14
巡檢司	xúnjiǎnsī	Inspectorate	in Guantou?	Fujian	14
巡檢司	xúnjiǎnsī	Inspectorate	in Mawei?	Fujian	14
五虎山	Wǔhǔshān	Five Tigers Island	Wuhu Reef	Fujian	14
福建布政司	Fújiànbùzhèngsī	Fortunate Construction Government	Fuzhou	Fujian	14
沙淺	shāqiǎn	shallow sand		Fujian	14
官塘山	Guāntángshān	Official Pond Island	Jixingjiao	Taiwan	14
馬頭	Mǎtóu	Horse Head	Matou Village	Fujian	14
南臺橋	Nántáiqiáo	South Station Bridge	Nantai Island	Fujian	14
長樂	Zhǎnglè	Long Music	Changle District	Fujian	14
三礁	sānjiāo	three reefs		Fujian	14
六平山	Liùpíngshān	Six Level Mountain	Dongfeng Mountain	Fujian	14
南山寺	Nánshānsì	Southern Mountain Temple	Nanshan Temple	Fujian	14
六平山	Liùpíngshān	Six Level Mountain	Liuping Mountain	Fujian	14
東沙	Dōngshā	Eastern Sand	Juguang Township	Taiwan	14
梅花千戶所	Méihuāqiānhùsuǒ	Plum Blossom Battalion Headquarters	Meihua Town	Fujian	14
牛者	Niúzhě	Cowboy	Niushan Island	Fujian	15
牛角山	Niújiǎoshān	Cow Point Mountain	Yuguoshan	Fujian	15
東墻	Dōngqiáng	East Wall	Pingtan Island	Fujian	15
草嶼	Cǎoyǔ	Grass Island	Caoyu Island	Fujian	15
鎮東衛	Zhèndōngwèi	Town East Guard	Gaoshan Town	Fujian	15
南日山	Nánrìshān	Southern Sun Mountain	Nanri Island	Fujian	15
烏邱山	Wūqiūshān	Dark Mound Island	Wuqiu Township	Taiwan	15
興化府	Xīnghuàfǔ	Flourishing Prefecture	Putian County	Fujian	15
湄洲官	Méizhōuguān	Brink Island Official	Meizhou Mazu Temple	Fujian	15
平海衛	Pínghǎiwèi	Flat Seas Guard	Pinghai Town	Fujian	15
崇武所	Chóngwǔsuǒ	Dignified Military Battalion	Chongwu Town	Fujian	16
泉州衛	Quánzhōuwèi	Fountain Prefecture Guard	Quanzhou City	Fujian	16
巡檢司	xúnjiǎnsī	Inspectorate	on Xiangzhi Peninsula?	Fujian	16
永寧衛	Yǒngníngwèi	Forever Tranquil Guard	Yongning Town	Fujian	16
平湖嶼	Pínghúyǔ	Flat Lake Island	Penghu County	Taiwan	16
東石巡檢司	Dōngshíxúnjiǎnsī	Eastern Stone Inspectorate	Shenhu Town	Fujian	16
金門千戶所	Jīnménqiānhùsuǒ	Golden Gate Battalion Headquarters	Kinmen County	Taiwan	16
漳州	Zhāngzhōu	Zhang (River) Prefecture	Zhangzhou City	Fujian	16
嘉禾千户所	Jiāhéqiānhùsuǒ	Fine Grain Battalion Headquarters	Xiamen City	Fujian	16
大武山	Dàwǔshān	Big Military Mountain	South Taiwu Mountain	Fujian	16
小甘	Xiǎogān	Small Sweet	Brothers Islands	Fujian	17
大甘	Dàgān	Big Sweet	Brothers Islands	Fujian	17
同山千戶所	Tóngshānqiānhùsuǒ	Similar Mountain Battalion Headquarters	Dongshan County	Fujian	17
外平	Wàipíng	Outer Flat	Nanpang Islands	Guangdong	17
南粵山	Nányuèshān	Southern Yue Mountain	Nan'ao Island	Guangdong	17
大星尖	Dàxīngjiān	Big Star Point	Pedro Blanco	Guangdong	17
蒲胎山	Pútāishān	Floating Platform Island	Po Toi Island	Hong Kong	17
官富寨	Guānfùzhài	Official Wealth Stronghold	Nantou, Shanzhen	Guangdong	17
佛堂門	Fótángmén	Buddhist Temple Gate	Fat Tong Mun	Hong Kong	17
大奚山	Dàxīshān	Big What Island	Lantau Island	Hong Kong	17
東姜山	Dōngjiāngshān	Eastern Ginger Island	Dangan Island	Guangdong	17
翁鞋山	Wēngxiéshān	Old-Man Shoes Island	Erzhou Island	Guangdong	17
泠汀山	Língtīngshān	Splashing Sandbank Island	Wailingding Island	Guangdong	17
小奚山	Xiǎoxīshān	Small What Island	part of Lantau Island	Hong Kong?	17
東莞所	Dōngguǎnsuǒ	Eastern Reeds Battalion	Dongguan City	Guangdong	17
北尖	Běijiān	North Point	Beijian Island	Guangdong	18
南停山	Nántíngshān	South Stop Mountain	Neilingding Island	Guangdong	18
九星	Jiǔxīng	Nine Stars	Jiuzhou Island	Guangdong	18
鹿頸高闌	Lùjǐnggāolán	Deer Neck High Railing	Gaolan Island	Guangdong	18
上下川山	Shàngxiàchuānshān	Upper and Lower River Islands	Chuanshan Archipelago	Guangdong	18
石星石塘	Shíxīngshítáng	Stone Star Stone Pond	Pratas Islands?	Disputed	18
大金	Dàjīn	Big Gold	Dahengqin Island	Guangdong	18
南海衛	Nánhǎiwèi	Southern Seas Guard	Nanhai District, Foshan City	Guangdong	18
香山所	Xiāngshānsuǒ	Fragrant Mountain Battalion	Zhongshan City	Guangdong	18
烏豬門	Wūzhūmén	Dark Pig Channel	channel past Wuzhu Island	Guangdong	18
小金	Xiǎojīn	Small Gold	Xiaohengqin Island, Guangdon	Guangdong	18
七洲	Qīzhōu	Seven Islands	Qizhou Liedao	Hainan	18
廣海衛	Guǎnghǎiwèi	Wide Sea Guard	Guanghai Town	Guangdong	18
神電衛	Shéndiànwèi	God-Shocked Guard	Diancheng Town	Guangdong	18
高州	Gāozhōu	High Province	Gaozhou City	Guangdong	18
廣東	Guǎngdōng	Wide East	Guangzhou City	Guangdong	18
銅鼓山	Tónggǔshān	Copper Drum Mountain	Tongguling Scenic Area	Hainan	18
萬生石塘嶼	Wànshēngshítángyǔ	Myriad Life Rock Pond Islets	Paracel Islands?	Disputed	18
雷州	Léizhōu	Mine Province	Leizhou Peninsula	Guangdong	18
萬州	Wànzhōu	Myriad Province	Wanning City	Hainan	18
獨豬山	Dúzhūshān	Lone Pig Island	Dazhou Island	Hainan	18
瓊州府	Qióngzhōufǔ	Jade Province House	Qiongshan District	Hainan	18
石塘	Shítáng	Stone Pond	Paracel Reefs?	Disputed	18
廉州	Liánzhōu	Cheap Province	Former Lian Prefecture	Guangxi	18
福州	Fúzhōu	Fortune Province	Danzhou City	Hainan	19
钦州	Qīnzhōu	Royal Province	Qinzhou City	Guangxi	19

== South China Sea ==
Label	Pinyin	Translation	Location	Country/Province	Page
交趾界	Jiāozhǐjiè	Crossed-Toes Border	Vietnam Border	Vietnam/Guangxi	19
南海黎母大山	Nánhǎilímǔdàshān	South Seas Great Mother Big Mountain	Loi voe Mountain	Hainan	19
大靈胡山	Dàlínghúshān	Big Spirit Beard Mountain	mountain east of Hue, Vietnam	Vietnam	19
交趾洋	Jiāozhǐyáng	Crossed-Toes Ocean	Gulf of Tonkin	Vietnam/Hainan	19
外羅山	Wàiluóshān	Outer Net Island	Cù-Lao Ré Island	Vietnam	19
石牌蛟	Shípáijiāo	Stone Plate Dragon	Chàm Islands	Vietnam	19
玳瑁山	Dàimàoshān	Hawksbill Turtle Mountain	Batangan Peninsula	Vietnam	19
白沙灣	Báishāwān	White Sand Bay	Vũng Mới Bay	Vietnam	20
青嶼	Qīngyǔ	Green Island	Buffalo Isle	Vietnam	20
占城國	Zhànchéngguó	[transliteration from Sino-Vietnamese]	Central Vietnam	Vietnam	20
筊杯嶼	Xiáobēiyǔ	Rope Cup Island	Nhơn Hải Peninsula	Vietnam	20
棺墓山	Guānmùshān	Coffin Tomb Mountain	Núi Dau Goc Let	Vietnam	20
新州港	Xīnzhōugǎng	New Province Anchorage	Qui Nhơn	Vietnam	20
洋嶼	Yángyǔ	Foreign Island	Cù lao Xanh	Vietnam	20
雞籠山	Jīlóngshān	Chicken Coop Island	Núi Mô Cheo	Vietnam	21
小灣	Xiǎowān	Little Bay	Xuân Đài Bay	Vietnam	21
靈山	Língshān	Spirit Mountain	Đá Bia Mountain	Vietnam	21
大灣	Dàwān	Big Bay	Vân Phong Bay	Vietnam	21
羅漢嶼	Luóhànyǔ	Collecting Chinese Island	Hòn Tre	Vietnam	21
羅灣頭	Luówāntóu	Collecting Bay Head	Mũi Dinh	Vietnam	21
東董	Dōngdǒng	Eastern Director	Hòn Hải	Vietnam	21
赤坎	Chìkǎn	[transliteration from Vietnamese]	Point Kê Gà	Vietnam	21
西董	Xīdǒng	Western Director	Hòn Thầy Bối	Vietnam	21
玳瑁洲	Dàimàozhōu	Hawksbill Turtle Island	Phú Quý	Vietnam	21
上臘港	Shànglàgǎng	Upon Year-End Anchorage	Sông Dinh River	Vietnam	21
東蛇籠 (東西蛇羅山)	Dōngshélóng (Dōngxīshéluóshān)	East & West Snake Cage Islands	Tanjong Datu	Indonesia/Malaysia	22
覆鼎山	Fùdǐngshān	Covered Tripod Mountain	Nui Khong?	Vietnam	22
白礁	Báijiāo	White Reef	Hòn Trứng	Vietnam	22
沙吳皮	Shāwúpí	Sand Shout Skin	Merundung Island	Indonesia	22
梹郞洲	Bīnlángzhōu	[transliteration?]	Hòn Bảy Cạnh	Vietnam	22
崑崙山	Kūnlúnshān	[transliteration from Vietnamese]	Côn Lôn, Côn Sơn Island	Vietnam	22
占臘港	Zhànlàgǎng	Khmer Anchorage	Soài Rạp River	Vietnam	22
占浦山	Zhànpǔshān	Cham Shore Mountain	Nui Chau Vien	Vietnam	22
竹嶼	Zhúyǔ	Bamboo Island	Hòn Bà	Vietnam	22
八開港	Bākāigǎng	[transliteration of Vaico] Anchorage	Vàm Cỏ River	Vietnam	22
銅鼓山	Tónggǔshān	Copper Drum Mountain	Mount Asuansang	Indonesia	22
大橫	Dàhéng	Big Traverse	Thổ Chu Island	Vietnam	22
佛山	Fúshān	Buddha Mountain	Vũng Tàu	Vietnam	22
占臘國	Zhànlàguó	[transliteration from Khmer]	Zhanla (Cambodia & Southern Vietnam)	Vietnam	22
小橫	Xiǎohéng	Small Traverse	Koh Poulo Wai	Cambodia	22
真嶼	Zhēnyǔ	True (Obi) Island	Hòn Khoai	Vietnam	22
小崑崙	Xiǎokūnlún	Small [transliteration from Vietnamese]	Trứng Lớn and Trứng Nhỏ Islands	Vietnam	22
假嶼	Jiǎyǔ	False (Obi) Island	Hòn Chuối	Vietnam	22
萬年嶼	Wànniányǔ	Ten Thousand Year Island	Pontianak	Indonesia	22
竹里木	Zhúlǐmù	[derived from full name in Khmer]	Phnom Penh	Cambodia	22
象坎	Xiàngkǎn	Elephant Ridge	Koh Chang	Thailand	22
奶門	Nǎimén	Milky Channel	Samae San Island	Thailand	22
小士闌	Xiǎoshìlán	Small Scholar Railing	Ko Tao Mo	Thailand	22
占賁港	Zhànbìgǎng	[transliteration from Thai]	Chantaburi	Thailand	22
大士闌	Dàshìlán	Big Scholar Railing	Ko Khram	Thailand	22
角圓山	Jiǎoyuánshān	Pointed Round Mountain	Khao Chamao	Thailand	22
暹羅國	Xiānluóguó	[transliteration of Siam and Lahu Kingdoms]	Ayutthaya Kingdom	Thailand	23
竹嶼	Zhúyǔ	Bamboo Island	Ko Sichang	Thailand	23
十二子山	Shíèrzishān	Twelve Boys Islands	Pulau Panebangan	Indonesia	23
假里馬達 (假里馬答)	Jiǎlǐmǎdá	[transliteration from Malay]	Karimata Islands	Indonesia	23
筆架山	Bǐjiàshān	Pen Rack Mountain	Khao Sam Roi Yot	Thailand	23
黎頭山	Lítóushān	Dark Head Island	Ko Lan	Thailand	23
犀角山	Xījiǎoshān	Rhino Horn Mountain	Laem Phak Bia	Thailand	23
交闌山 (交欄山)	Jiāolánshān	Crossed Fence Island	Gelam Island	Indonesia	23
出蘇木	chūsūmù	produces sappanwood		Thailand	23
赤坎	Chìkǎn	Red Ridge	Khao Lom Muak	Thailand	24
吉利悶	Jílìmèn	[transliteration from Malay]	Karimunjawa, Karimun	Indonesia	24
馬鞍山	Mǎ'ānshān	Horse Saddle Island	Ko Tao	Thailand	24
佛山	Fúshān	Buddha Island	Ko Wiang	Thailand	24
石班洲	Shíbānzhōu	Stone Class Province	Ko Pha-ngan	Thailand	24
海門山	Hǎiménshān	Sea Gate Island	Ko Samui	Thailand	24
爪哇國	Zhǎowāguó	[transliteration from Bahasa]	Java Island	Indonesia	24
玳瑁嶼	Dàimàoyǔ	Hawksbill Turtle Island	Ko Kra	Thailand	24
眾不淺	Zhòngbùqiǎn	Many Not Shallows	Laem Talumphuk	Thailand	24
大小姨山	Dàxiǎoyíshān	Big and Small Aunt Islands	Sangiang	Indonesia	25
石礁	Shíjiāo	rocky reef	east of Billiton	Indonesia	25
孫姑那	Sūngūnà	[transliteration from Thai]	Songkhla	Thailand	25
貓鼠嶼	Māoshǔyǔ	Cat & Mouse Island	Ko Maew & Ko Nu	Thailand	25
麻里束 (麻里東)	Málǐshù (Málǐdōng)	[transliteration from Bahasa]	Belitung Island	Indonesia	25
麻剌哇嶼	Máláwayǔ	Spicy Obstinant Wow Island	Pulau Kebatu	Indonesia	25
硫黃嶼	Liúhuángyǔ	Sulphur Island	Krakatoa	Indonesia	25
狼西加	Lángxījiā	[transliteration]	Langkasuka Kingdom	Thailand	25
昆下池港	Kūnxiàchígǎng	Lower Stream of Kun Anchorage	Pattani River	Thailand	25
砂淺出水	shāqiǎnchūshuǐ	above-water sand shoals	Mendanau Island	Indonesia	25
担嶼	Dānyǔ	Burden Island	Sumur Islands	Indonesia	25
出降真	chūjiàngzhēn	produces lakawood		Thailand	25
烟墩嶼 (煙燉嶼)	Yāndūnyǔ (Yāndùnyǔ)	Smoky Stewed Island	Pulau Susu Dara	Malaysia	25
馬鞍山	Mǎ'ānshān	Horse Saddle Island	Pulau Sertung	Indonesia	25
昆下池	Kūnxiàchí	Lower Stream of Kun	Pattani Bay	Thailand	25
鬼嶼	Guǐyǔ	Ghost Island	Pulau Seram	Indonesia	25
攬邦港	Lǎnbānggǎng	[transliteration] + anchorage	Lampung Bay	Indonesia	25
西港	Xīgǎng	[transliteration from Thai]	Sai Buri	Thailand	25
三角嶼	Sānjiǎoyǔ	Triangle Island	Greater Perhentian Island	Malaysia	25
竹嶼	Zhúyǔ	Bamboo Island	Pulau Mundu	Indonesia	25
涼傘礁	Liángsǎnjiāo	Parasol Reef	Pulau Labon	Indonesia	25
三麥嶼	Sānmàiyǔ	Three Wheat Island	Pulau Maspari	Indonesia	25
出降香	Chūjiàngxiāng	produces lakawood		Malaysia	25
古闌丹港	Gǔlándāngǎng	[transliteration from Malay]	Sungai Kelantan Estuary	Malaysia	25
石山	Shíshān	Stone Island	Lang Tengah Island	Malaysia	25
羊嶼	Yángyǔ	Sheep Island	Redang Island	Malaysia	25
都魯把汪 (都魯把旺)	Dōulǔbǎwāng (Dōulǔbǎwàng)	[transliteration from Malay]	Tulang Bawang	Indonesia	25
龜嶼	Guīyǔ	Turtle Island	Tanjung Tua	Indonesia	25
角員	Jiǎoyuán	Corner Member	Bidong Island	Malaysia	25
狹門	Xiámén	Narrow Gate	Bangka Strait	Indonesia	25
吉貝嶼	Jíbèiyǔ	[transliteration from Malay]	Pulau Kapak	Malaysia	25
丁加下路 (丁家廬)	Dīngjiāxiàlù (Dīngjiālú)	[transliteration from Malay]	Kuala Trengganu	Malaysia	25
斗嶼	Dòuyǔ	Fight Island	Tenggol Island	Malaysia	26
椰子塘	Yēzitáng	Coconut Pond	Enggano Island	Indonesia	26
東港	Dōnggǎng	East Harbor	Air Saleh River	Indonesia	26
彭杭港 (彭亨港)	Pénghánggǎng (Pénghēnggǎng)	[transliteration]	Sungei Pahang Estuary	Malaysia	26
打金山	Dǎjīnshān	Strike Gold Mountain	Mount Patah	Indonesia	26
舊港	Jiùgǎng	Old Port	Musi River (center channel)	Indonesia	26
苧麻山	Zhùmáshān	Ramie Island	Tioman Island	Malaysia	26
石礁	Shíjiāo	rocky reef	Pulau Siribuat	Malaysia	26
彭加山	Péngjiāshān	[transliteration]	Bangka Island	Indonesia	26
西港	Xīgǎng	West Harbor	Air Banjuasin River	Indonesia	26
官嶼	Guānyǔ	Official Island	Berhala Island	Indonesia	26
東竹山	Dōngzhúshān	East Bamboo Island	Pulau Aur East Mountain	Malaysia	26
犀角山	Xījiǎoshān	Rhino Horn Mountain	Mount Dempo	Indonesia	26
西竹山	Xīzhúshān	West Bamboo Island	Pulau Aur West Mountain	Malaysia	26
龍牙山	Lóngyáshān	[transliteration]	Lingga Island	Indonesia	26
百必港 (占必港)	Bǎibìgǎng (Zhànbìgǎng)	[transliteration of Jambi]	Batang Hari River	Indonesia	26
舊港	Jiùgǎng	Old Port	Palembang	Indonesia	26
三佛嶼	Sānfúyǔ	Three Buddhas Island	Alang Tiga Islets	Indonesia	26
毘宋嶼	Písòngyǔ	[transliteration]	Pulau Mega	Indonesia	26
將軍帽	Jiāngjūnmào	General's Hat	Tinggi Island	Malaysia	26
鼇魚山 (鰲魚嶼)	Áoyúshān (Áoyúyǔ)	Turtle Fish Island	Buaja Island	Indonesia	27
白礁	Báijiāo	White Reef	Pedra Branca	Singapore	27
橫山	Héngshān	Horizontal Mountain	Mount Kerinci	Indonesia	27
荅答那溪嶼	Dādánàxīyǔ	Answer that Stream Island	Johor	Malaysia	27
官嶼	Guānyǔ	Official Island	Pulau Tekong	Singapore	27

== Strait of Malacca ==
Label	Pinyin	Translation	Location	Country/Province	Page
馬鞍山	Mǎ'ānshān	Horse Saddle Island	Bintan Island	Indonesia	27
龍牙門	Lóngyámén	Dragon Tooth Channel	Long Ya Men, Singapore Strait	Indonesia	27
琶撓嶼	Pánáoyǔ	Lute Scratch Island	Pulau Anak Sambu	Indonesia	27
東吉山	Dōngjíshān	Eastern Luck Island	Pulau Durai	Indonesia	27
琵琶嶼	Pípáyǔ	Lute Island	Saint John's Island	Singapore	27
淡馬錫	Dànmǎxī	[transliteration from Malay]	Singapore	Singapore	27
牛屎礁	Niúshǐjiāo	Ox Dung Reef	Buffalo Rock	Indonesia	27
甘巴門	Gānbāmén	[transliteration]	Kundur Channel	Indonesia	27
赤角山	Chìjiǎoshān	Red Point Mountain	Mount Talakmau	Indonesia	27
涼傘嶼	Liángsǎnyǔ	Parasol Island	Pulau Labun	Indonesia	27
長腰嶼	Zhǎngyāoyǔ	Long Waist Island	Pulau Satumu	Singapore	27
甘巴港	Gānbāgǎng	Kampar Anchorage	Kampar River	Indonesia	27
沙糖淺	shātángqiǎn	shallow sand		Indonesia	27
仁義礁	Rényìjiāo	Humane Justice Reef	Kundur Island	Indonesia	27
牛昆礁 (牛屎礁)	Niúkūnjiāo (Niúshǐjiāo)	Ox Dung Reef	Mendol Island	Indonesia	27
白沙	Báishā	white sand	Pagai Islands	Indonesia	28
吉利門	Jílìmén	[transliteration]	Great Karimun	Indonesia	28
鬼嶼	Guǐyǔ	Ghost Island	Rangsang Island	Indonesia	28
毘宋嶼	Písòngyǔ	[transliteration]	Pulau Pisang	Malaysia	28
射箭山	Shèjiànshān	Archery Mountain	Mount Banang	Malaysia	28
平洲	Píngzhōu	Flat Province	The Brothers	Indonesia	28
沙糖礁	shātángjiān	Sand Sugar Reef	Siberut	Indonesia	28
滿剌加	Mǎnlájiā	[transliteration]	Malacca	Malaysia	28
九嶼	Jiǔyǔ	Nine Islands	Batu Islands	Indonesia	28
官廠	Guānchǎng	Government Mill (trading base)	at Malacca	Malaysia	28
雙嶼	Shuāngyǔ	Double Islands	The Brothers	Indonesia	29
假五嶼	Jiǎwǔyǔ	False Five Island	Tanjung Tuan	Malaysia	29
金嶼	Jīnyǔ	Gold Island	Pini Island	Indonesia	29
雞骨嶼	Jīgǔyǔ	Chicken Bone Island	Kepulauan Arwah	Indonesia	29
沉礁	chénjiāo	sunken reef	Hinako Islands	Indonesia	29
綿花嶼	Miánhuāyǔ	Cotton Island	Bukit Jugra	Malaysia	29
吉令港	Jílìnggǎng	[transliteration from Malay]	Klang Estuary	Malaysia	29
綿花淺	Miánhuāqiǎn	Cotton Shoal	Amazon Maru Shoal	Malaysia	29
龍牙加兒港 (龍牙加皃港)	Lóngyájiāmàogǎng	Dragon Tooth Plus Child Anchorage	Sibolga	Indonesia	29
龍牙加兒山 (龍牙加皃山)	Lóngyájiāmàoshān	Dragon Tooth Plus Child Mountain	Tombak Rantjang	Indonesia	29
南傅山	Nánfùshān	South Teacher Island	Pulau Nias	Indonesia	29
吉那大山	Jínàdàshān	[transliteration of Cherakah]	Bukit Cherakah	Malaysia	29
涼傘嶼	Liángsǎnyǔ	Parasol Island	Pulau Tuangku	Indonesia	30
九洲	Jiǔzhōu	Nine Provinces	Pulau Sembilan, Perak	Malaysia	30
雙嶼	Shuāngyǔ	Double Island	Pandang and Salahnama Islands	Indonesia	30
班卒	Bānzú	[transliteration]	Barus	Indonesia	30
陳公嶼	Chéngōngyǔ	Old Public Island	Pulau Jarak	Malaysia	30
檳榔嶼	Bīnlángyǔ	[transliteration]	Penang	Malaysia	30
吉達港	Jídágǎng	Kedah Anchorage	Merbok River, Kedah	Malaysia	30
龍牙交椅	Lóngyájiāoyǐ	[transliteration]	Langkawi	Malaysia	30
亞路	Yàlù	[transliteration from ancient Javanese]	Aru Kingdom	Indonesia	30
單嶼	Dānyǔ	Single Island	Pulau Berhala	Indonesia	30
石城山	Shíchéngshān	Stone City Island	Simeulue	Indonesia	30
古力由不洞	Gǔlìyóubudòng	[transliteration]	Batong Group	Thailand	30
有人家	Yǒurénjiā	Inhabited	referring to Simeulue?	Indonesia	30
甘杯港	Gānbēigǎng	[transliteration of Kampei]	Kampei Kingdom	Indonesia	30
獨掛頭山	Dúguàtóushān	[transliteration of Takua Thung]	Promthep Cape, Phuket	Thailand	31
巴碌頭	Bālùtóu	[transliteration]	Peureulak Sultanate	Indonesia	31
急水湾	Jíshuǐwān	Rapids Bay	Meunasah Asan	Indonesia	31
蘇門答剌	Sūméndálá	[transliteration]	Samudera Pasai Sultanate	Indonesia	31
答那思里	Dánàsīlǐ	[transliteration]	Tanintharyi	Myanmar	31
官廠	guānchǎng	Government Mill (trading base)	Unknown location near Samudera	Indonesia	31
北暹	Běixiān	North Siam	Palauk	Myanmar	32
答那思里	Dánàsīlǐ	[transliteration]	Tenasserim Island	Myanmar	32
大小花面	Dàxiǎohuāmiàn	Big and Small Tattooed Faces	Meulaboh	Indonesia	32
打歪	Dǎwāi	[transliteration]	Dawei	Myanmar	32
打歪嶼	Dǎwāiyǔ	[transliteration]	Mali Kyun	Myanmar	32
屏風山	Píngfēngshān	Windscreen Mountain	Seulawaih Agam	Indonesia	32
打歪山	Dǎwāishān	[transliteration]	Dawei Point	Myanmar	32
有人家	yǒurénjiā	Inhabited	referring to Pulau Raya?	Indonesia	32
八都馬	Bādūmǎ	[transiteration from Mon]	Mottama	Myanmar	32
白土	Báitǔ	White Earth	Ujung Masammuka	Indonesia	32
竹牌礁	Zhúpáijiāo	Bamboo Tablet Reef	Moscos Islands	Myanmar	32
南巫星 (南巫里)	Nánwūxīng (Nánwūlǐ)	[transliteration of local name]	Lamuri Kingdom	Indonesia	32

== Bay of Bengal ==
Label	Pinyin	Translation	Location	Country/Province	Page
克迭迷	Kèdiémí	[transliteration]	Kadonkani	Myanmar	32
虎尾礁	Hǔwěijiāo	Tiger Tail reef	Rusa Island	Indonesia	32
帽山	Màoshān	Hat Island	Weh Island	Indonesia	32
馬船礁	Mǎchuánjiāo	Horse Boat Reef	island at the mouth of Pathein River	Myanmar	32
翠藍嶼	Cuìlányǔ	Green Blue Island	Great Nicobar Island	India	33
龍涎嶼	Lóngxiányǔ	Ambergris Island	Pulau Breueh	Indonesia	33
馬旺山	Mǎwàngshān	[transliteration]	Cheduba Island	Myanmar	33
金嶼	Jīnyǔ	Gold Island	Car Nicobar	India	33
大莫山	Dàmòshān	Big Nothing Mountain	Pakusa Mountain	Myanmar	33
北平頭山	Běipíngtóushān	North Flat Head Island	Little Andaman Island	India	33
小莫山	Xiǎomòshān	Small Nothing Island	Ramree Island	Myanmar	33
按篤蠻山	Àndǔmánshān	[transliteration]	North Andaman Islands	India	33
落坑山	Luòkēngshān	Pitfall Island	Myengun Kyun	Myanmar	33
落坑	Luòkēng	Pitfall	Mrauk U	Myanmar	33
龜頭山	Guītóushān	[transliteration]	Kyauktaw Mountain	Myanmar	33
赤土山	Chìtǔshān	Red Earth Mountain	Mayu Mountain	Myanmar	33
木客港	Mùkègǎng	[transliteration]	Maheshkhali, Cox's Bazar	Bangladesh	34
撒地港	Sādegǎng	[transliteration]	Chittagong	Bangladesh	34
九官人淺	Jiǔguānrénqiǎn	Nine Officials Shallows	Sandwip Island	Bangladesh	34

== Western Indian Ocean ==
Label	Pinyin	Translation	Location	Country/Province	Page
已龍溜	Yǐlóngliū	Already Dragon Slip	Laamu Atoll	Maldives	34
榜葛剌	Bǎnggélá	[transliteration]	Bengal Sultanate	Bangladesh	34
竹牌礁	Zhúpáijiāo	Bamboo Plate Reef	Green Island	Sri Lanka	34
麻林地	Málíndì	[transliteration]	Malindi	Kenya	35
佛堂	fótáng	Buddhist temple	Trincomalee	Sri Lanka	35
沙剌溜	Shāláliū	Sandy Slash Slip	Mulaku Atoll	Maldives	35
錫蘭山	Xīlánshān	[transliteration]	Sri Lanka	Sri Lanka	35
別羅里	Biéluólǐ	[transliteration]	Beruwala	Sri Lanka	35
(千)佛堂	(Qiān) Fótáng	Buddhist temple	Dondra	Sri Lanka	35
葛答幹	Gédágàn	[transliteration]	Ilha Quitangonha	Mozambique	35
禮金務	Lǐjīnwù	Ceremony Gold Business	Negombo	Sri Lanka	35
高郎務	Gāolángwù	[transliteration]	Colombo	Sri Lanka	35
官嶼	guānyǔ	Official Island	Malé	Maldives	35
門肥赤	Ménféichì	[transliteration]	Mafia Island	Tanzania	35
者剌則郎哈剌	Zhělázélánghālá	[transliteration from Arabic]	Zanzibar Archipelago	Tanzania	35
慢八撒	Mànbāsā	[transliteration from Arabic]	Mombasa	Kenya	35
任不知溜	rènbùzhīliū	Nobody Knows Slip	Lhaviyani Atoll	Maldives	35
加異城	Jiāyìchéng	Kayal [transliteration from Tamil] City	Kayalpatanam	India	35
起答兒	Qǐdáer	Start Answer Child	Manda Island	Kenya	35
芝蘭	Zhīlán	Fungus Orchid	Chidambaram	India	35
葛得兒風	Gédéerfēng	[transliteration from ancient Italian "guarda fui"]	Cape Guardafui	Somalia	35
甘巴里頭	Gānbālǐtóu	[transliteration]	Kanyakumari	India	35
起來溜	Qǐláiliū	[transliteration]	Kelaa	Maldives	35
麻裡溪溜	Málǐxīliū	[transliteration]	Minicoy Island	India	35
第一赤泥	Dìyīchìní	First Red Mud	Thiruvananthapuram	India	35
木魯旺 (卜剌哇)	Mùlǔwàng (Boláwa)	[transliteration]	Barawa	Somalia	35
不剌哇	Bùláwa	[transliteration]	Barawa	Somalia	35
買列補	Mǎilièbǔ	[transliteration]	Mylapore	India	35
小葛蘭	Xiǎogélán	[transliteration]	Kollam	India	35
木骨都束	Mùgǔdōushù	[transliteration]	Mogadishu	Somalia	36
沙里八丹	Shālǐbādān	[transliteration]	Nagapattinam	India	36
短知蛮 (短知蠻)	Duǎnzhīmán	Short Knowledge Man	Alappuzha	India	36
抹兒幹別	Mǒérgànbié	[transliteration from Arabic]	Ras Ma'bar	Somalia	36
俱里都利	Jùlǐdōulì	[transliteration]	Srikakulam	India	36
柯枝國	Kēzhīguó	[transliteration]	Kochi	India	36
辛剌高㟁	Xīnlágāoàn	[transliteration]	Sonargaon	Bangladesh	36
加平年溜	Jiāpíngniánliū	[transliteration]	Kalpeni Island	India	36
龍牙葛	Lóngyágé	[transliteration]	Nagavali River	India	36
剌思那呵	Lásīnàhē	Obstinate Thought That Shout	Ras Assuad	Somalia	36
加寧八丹	Jiāníngbādān	[transliteration]	Kalingapatnam	India	36
古里國	Gǔlǐguó	[transliteration]	Kozhikode	India	36
波羅高㟁	Bōluógāoàn	[transliteration]	Barguna	Bangladesh	36
黑兒	Hēier	[transliteration of Eyl?]	Ras el Cheil Cape	Somalia	36
白礁	Báijiāo	white reef	Velliyamkallu	India	36
佛思洞	Fúsīdòng	Buddha Thought Cave	Sonpur	India	36
哈哈迭微	Hāhādiéwēi	[transliteration from Malayalam]	Mahé	India	36
折的希㟁	Zhédexīàn	[transliteration]	Chakdaha	India	36
加加溜	Jiājiāliū	Kaka [transliteration?] Slip	Kavaratti Island	India	36
骨八丹	Gǔbādān	[transliteration of Kushabhadra?]	Manikpatna	India	36
木兒立哈必兒	Mùerlìhābìer	[transliteration]	Ras Ma'bar	Somalia	36
盆那碌	Pénnàlù	Basin That Busy	Kadalur Point	India	36
卜得法難	Bodéfǎnán	[transliteration]	Puthuppanam	India	36
丁得把昔	Dīngdébǎxī	[transliteration]	Devgad	India	36
歇立	Xiēlì	[transliteration]	Ezhimala	India	36
烏里舍城	Wūlǐshìchéng	[transliteration of Orissa] City	Cuttack	India	36
安都里溜	Āndōulǐliū	[transliteration]	Andrott Island	India	36
哈甫泥	Hāfǔní (Hāfǔer)	[transliteration]	Xaafuun	Somalia	36
烏里舍塔	Wūlǐshìtǎ	[transliteration]	Puri	India	36
旁不八丹	Pángbùbādān	[transliteration]	Patna	India	36
莽葛奴兒	Mǎnggénúer	[transliteration]	Mangalore	India	37
須多大嶼（番名連古荅剌）	Xūduōdàyǔ (fānmíngliángǔdālá)	[transliteration]	Socotra Island	Yemen	37
阿者刁	Āzhědiāo	[transliteration]	Anjediva Island	India	37
阿丹	Ādān	[transliteration]	Aden	Yemen	37
纏打兀兒	Chándǎwùer	[transliteration of Sindapur]	Goa	India	37
破兒牙	Pòeryá	[transliteration]	Velaneshwar	India	37
剌撒	Lásā	[transliteration]	Mukalla	Yemen	37
跛兒牙	Bǒeryá	[transliteration]	Bankot	India	37
起兒末兒	Qǐermòer	[transliteration]	Chaul	India	37
失里兒	Shīlǐer	[transliteration]	Ash-Shihr	Yemen	37
馬哈音	Mǎhāyīn	[transliteration of Maharashtra]	Mahim, Mumbai	India	37
加剌哈	Jiāláhā	[transliteration]	Qalhat	Oman	37
麻樓	Málóu	[transliteration]	Maroli	India	37
羅法	Luófǎ	[transliteration]	Al Luḩayyah	Yemen	37
佐法兒	Zuǒfǎer	[transliteration]	Dhofar	Oman	38
坎八葉城	Kǎnbāyèchéng	[transliteration of Khambhat]	Khambhat	India	38
刁元	Diāoyuán	[transliteration]	Diu	India	38
阿胡那	Āhúnà	Flatter Beard That	Ras al Madrakah	Oman	38
雜葛得	Zágédé	[transliteration]	Dwarka	India	38
新得	Xīndé	[transliteration]	Sindh	Pakistan	38
碟于里	Diéyúlǐ	[transliteration]	Debal	Pakistan	38
大灣	Dàwān	Big Bay	Gulf of Masirah	Oman	38
離坎八葉八日路	líkǎnbāyèbārìlù	eight-day voyage(?) from Khambhat		Pakistan	38
千佛池番名撒昔靈	Qiānfúchífānmíngsāxīlíng	10,000 Buddha Pond (foreign name: Saxiling)	Ghaz Ab Kaur	Pakistan	38
吳實記落	Wúshíjìluò	Shout Real Remember Drop	Sir Creek	Pakistan/India	38
客實	Kèshí	[transliteration]	Kech	Pakistan	38
都里馬新富	Dōulǐmǎxīnfù	[transliteration]	Musandam Peninsula	Oman/UAE	38
木克郎	Mùkèláng	[transliteration]	Makran Coast	Pakistan	38
八思尼	Bāsīní	[transliteration]	Pasni	Pakistan	38
克瓦荅兒 (克瓦答兒)	Kèwǎdāer (Kèwǎdáer)	[transliteration]	Gwadar	Pakistan	38
迭微	Diéwēi	[transliteration]	Tiwi	Oman	39
古里牙	Gǔlǐyá	[transliteration]	Quraiyat	Oman	39
克瓦荅兒 (克瓦答兒)	Kèwǎdāer (Kèwǎdáer)	[transliteration]	Chabahar	Iran	39
查實	Cháshí	[transliteration]	Jask	Iran	39
苦思荅兒 (苦思答兒)	Kǔsīdāer (Kǔsīdáer)	[transliteration]	Kouhestak	Iran	39
麻實吉	Máshíjí	[transliteration]	Muscat	Oman	39
龜嶼	Guīyǔ	Tortoise Island	Al Fahal Island	Oman	39
亞東灾記嶼 (亞束災記嶼)	Yàdōngzāijìyǔ (Yàshùzāijìyǔ)	[transliteration]	Ad Dimaniyat Islands	Oman	40
撒剌抹嶼	Sālámǒyǔ	[transliteration]	Quoin Island	Oman	40
苦碌麻剌	Kǔlùmálá	Bitter Busy Hemp Slash	Minab	Iran	40
假忽魯謨斯	Jiǎhūlǔmósī	[transliteration]	Qeshm Island	Iran	40
忽魯莫斯	Hūlǔmòsī	[transliteration]	Hormuz	Iran	40
剌兒可束	Láerkěshù	[transliteration]	Larak Island	Iran	40
