= Masirah Bay =

The Masirah Bay or Khalīj Maṣīrah may refer to:

- Masirah Channel
- Gulf of Masirah
