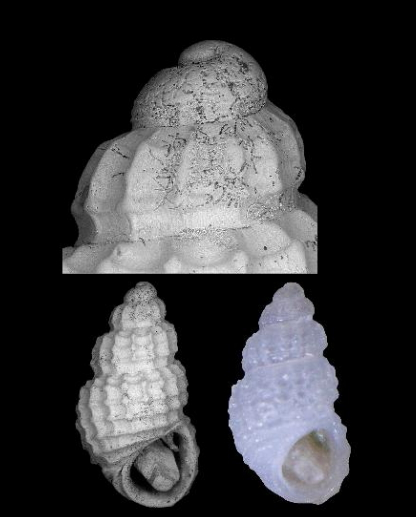
- Shell of Alvania masirahensis (holotype at MNHN, Paris)

Scientific classification
- Kingdom: Animalia
- Phylum: Mollusca
- Class: Gastropoda
- Subclass: Caenogastropoda
- Order: Littorinimorpha
- Superfamily: Rissooidea
- Family: Rissoidae
- Genus: Alvania
- Species: A. masirahensis

Binomial name
- Alvania masirahensis Perugia, 2021

= Alvania masirahensis =

Species of gastropod

Alvania masirahensis is a species of minute sea snail, a marine gastropod mollusk or micromollusk in the family Rissoidae.

== Description ==
The length of the shell attains 2.02 mm, its diameter is 1 mm.

== Distribution ==
This marine species occurs off Masirah Island, Oman.
