= 龜頭 =

龜頭 or 亀頭, meaning "glans penis", may refer to:

- Japanese surname
  - Kitou Mantarou (亀頭 万太郎), fictional character in manga Kame Kitou Mantarou Ore to Monogatari by Noboru Rokuda
- Kwai Tau Leng (龜頭嶺), a village in Fanling, New Territories East of Hong Kong
- one of lemmas in Mandarin Chinese profanity
- 龜頭山, a transliterated place name for Kyauktaw Mountain, located in Myanmar, on Mao Kun map

== See also ==
- The dictionary definition of 龜 at Wiktionary
- The dictionary definition of 亀 at Wiktionary
- The dictionary definition of 頭 at Wiktionary
