= List of lighthouses in Oman =

This is a list of lighthouses in Oman.

== Lighthouses ==
Name	Image	Year built	Location & coordinates	Class of Light	Focal height	NGA number	Admiralty number	Range nml
As Sifah Lighthouse		n/a	Al-Sifah; 23°24′58.1″N 58°47′38.6″E	Fl R 5s.	9 metres (30 ft)	28611	D7318.32	5
Bandar Al Rowdha Lighthouse		n/a	Al Bustan; 23°35′03.8″N 58°36′28.2″E	Fl (2) R 5s.	9 metres (30 ft)	28610	D7318.4	3
Didamar Lighthouse		1914	Little Quoin Island; 26°28′38.2″N 56°32′18.4″E	Fl (2) W 10s.	60 metres (200 ft)	28552	D7335	23
Jazirat Al Fahl Lighthouse		n/a	Gulf of Oman; 23°40′50.5″N 58°32′02.9″E	Fl W 15s.	95 metres (312 ft)	28600	D7322	7
Juzor Ad Dimaniyat Lighthouse		n/a	Ad Dimaniyat Islands; 23°51′18.0″N 58°03′54.0″E	Fl W 10s.	31 metres (102 ft)	28592	D7324	15
Masirah Lighthouse		2014	Masirah Island; 20°10′16.8″N 58°38′22.6″E	Fl W 10s.	85 metres (279 ft)	n/a	7315.98	n/a
Masqat Lighthouse		1930s	Masqat Island; 23°37′33.8″N 58°35′47.0″E	Fl W 12s.	95 metres (312 ft)	28608	D7320	19
Port Sultan Qaboos Lighthouse		n/a	Port Sultan Qaboos; 23°37′38.9″N 58°34′20.4″E	Iso G 8s.	9 metres (30 ft)	28605	D7321.6	7
Ra's al Hadd Lighthouse		n/a	Ras al Hadd; 22°31′59.1″N 59°47′53.9″E	Fl W 10s.	42 metres (138 ft)	30902	D7318	18
Ra's Shiekh Mas'ud Lighthouse		n/a	Musandam Governorate; 6°15′22.2″N 56°12′51.4″E	Fl W 5s.	19 metres (62 ft)	30160	D7336	10
Salalah Inner Channel Lighthouse		n/a	Salalah; 16°56′05.8″N 54°00′16.8″E	F WRG	40 metres (130 ft)	30911	D7314.2	5
Salalah Main Channel Lighthouse		n/a	Salalah; 16°57′42.3″N 53°59′51.8″E	F WRG	15 metres (49 ft)	30913.6	D7314.3	10
Sohar East Breakwater Lighthouse		2002	Sohar; 24°29′34.8″N 56°37′43.6″E	Iso WRG 5s.	15 metres (49 ft)	28588.1	D7326.25	10
Sur Lighthouse		n/a	Sur; 22°34′08.4″N 59°32′23.2″E	Fl W 5s.	20 metres (66 ft)	28618	D7318.1	10

== See also ==
- Lists of lighthouses and lightvessels
