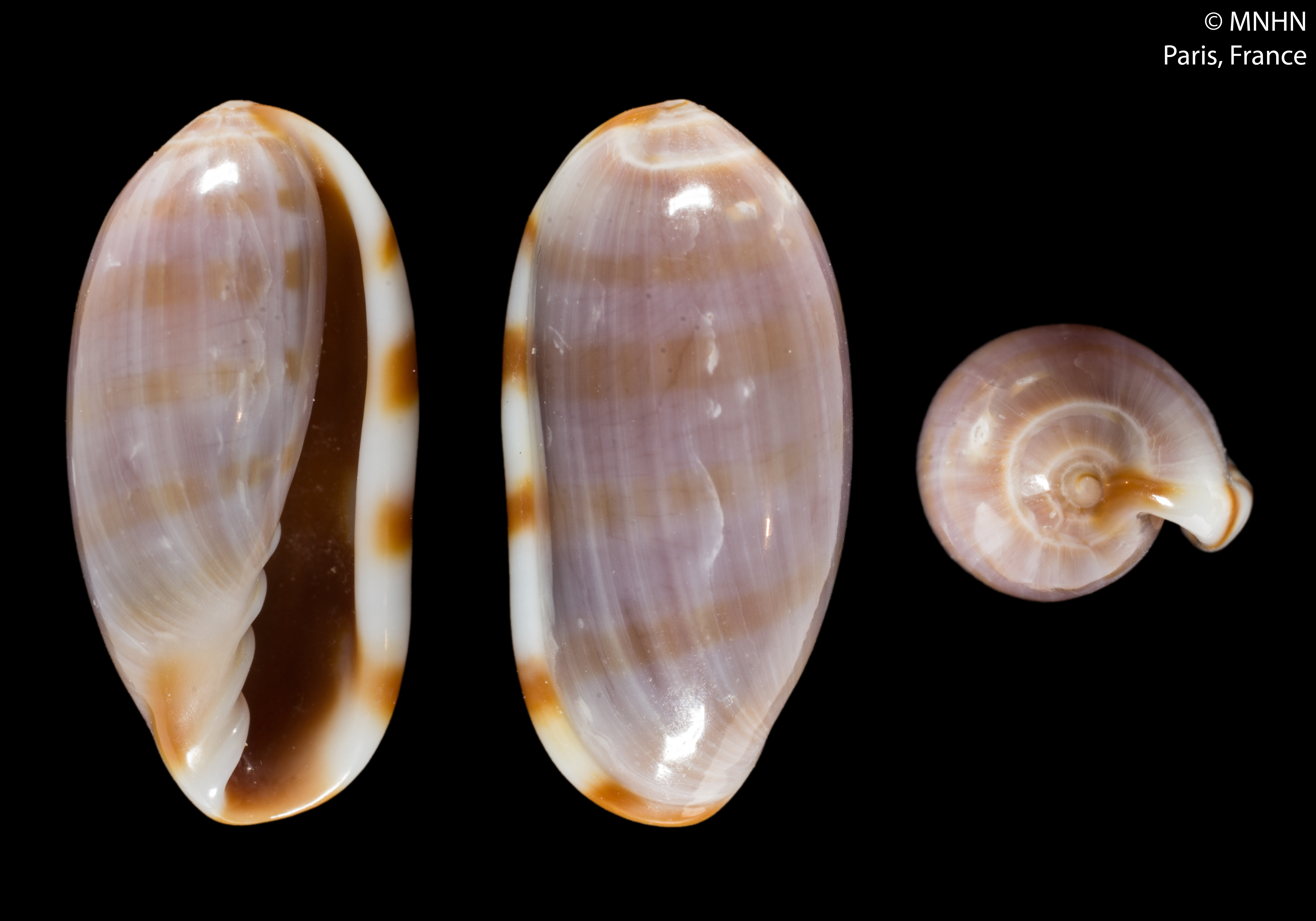
- Shell of Volvarina arabica (holotype at MNHN, Paris)

Scientific classification
- Kingdom: Animalia
- Phylum: Mollusca
- Class: Gastropoda
- Subclass: Caenogastropoda
- Order: Neogastropoda
- Family: Marginellidae
- Subfamily: Marginellinae
- Genus: Volvarina
- Species: V. arabica

Binomial name
- Volvarina arabica Boyer, 2015

= Volvarina arabica =

Species of gastropod

Volvarina arabica is a species of sea snail, a marine gastropod mollusk in the family Marginellidae, the margin snails. It is a benthic species typically found in depths 4 to 25 meters.

== Description ==
The length of the shell attains 16.5 mm, its diameter is 7.9 mm.

== Distribution ==
This marine species occurs off Mazeira Island, an island off the east coast Oman in the Arabian Sea.
