= Barr al-Hikman =

Plain and peninsula located in Oman

Coordinates: 20°29′N 58°23′E

Barr al-Ḥikmān (Arabic: بر الحكمان) is a plain and peninsula located in the northeast of Al Wusta Governorate, Oman. It borders the Sharqiya Sands in the north, the Masirah Channel in the east, the Gulf of Masirah in the south, the Ḥashīsh Bay (Arabic: غبة حشيش) in the southwest, and Wādī Ḥalfayn (Arabic: وادي حلفين) in the northwest. It is named for the tribe of al-Ḥikmān whose main settlement is Muḥūt to the northwest of Barr al-Ḥikmān.

Barr al-Ḥikmān is mostly uninhabited, and its coastal wetlands provide shelter for wildlife. On 25 October 2023, it is designated as a Ramsar site under the name Wetlands Reserve in Al Wusta Governorate.
