= Al-Bustan, Oman =

Coordinates: 23°34′15″N 58°36′33″E

Al Bustān البستان
- Village
- Location in Oman
- Country: Oman
- Governorate: Muscat Governorate
- Time zone: UTC+4 (Oman Standard Time)
- Bandar Al Rowdha East Breakwater Lighthouse
- Foundation: concrete base
- Construction: metal post
- Height: 7 m (23 ft)
- Shape: cylindrical post
- Focal height: 9 m (30 ft)
- Range: 3 nmi (5.6 km; 3.5 mi)
- Characteristic: Fl(2) R 5s

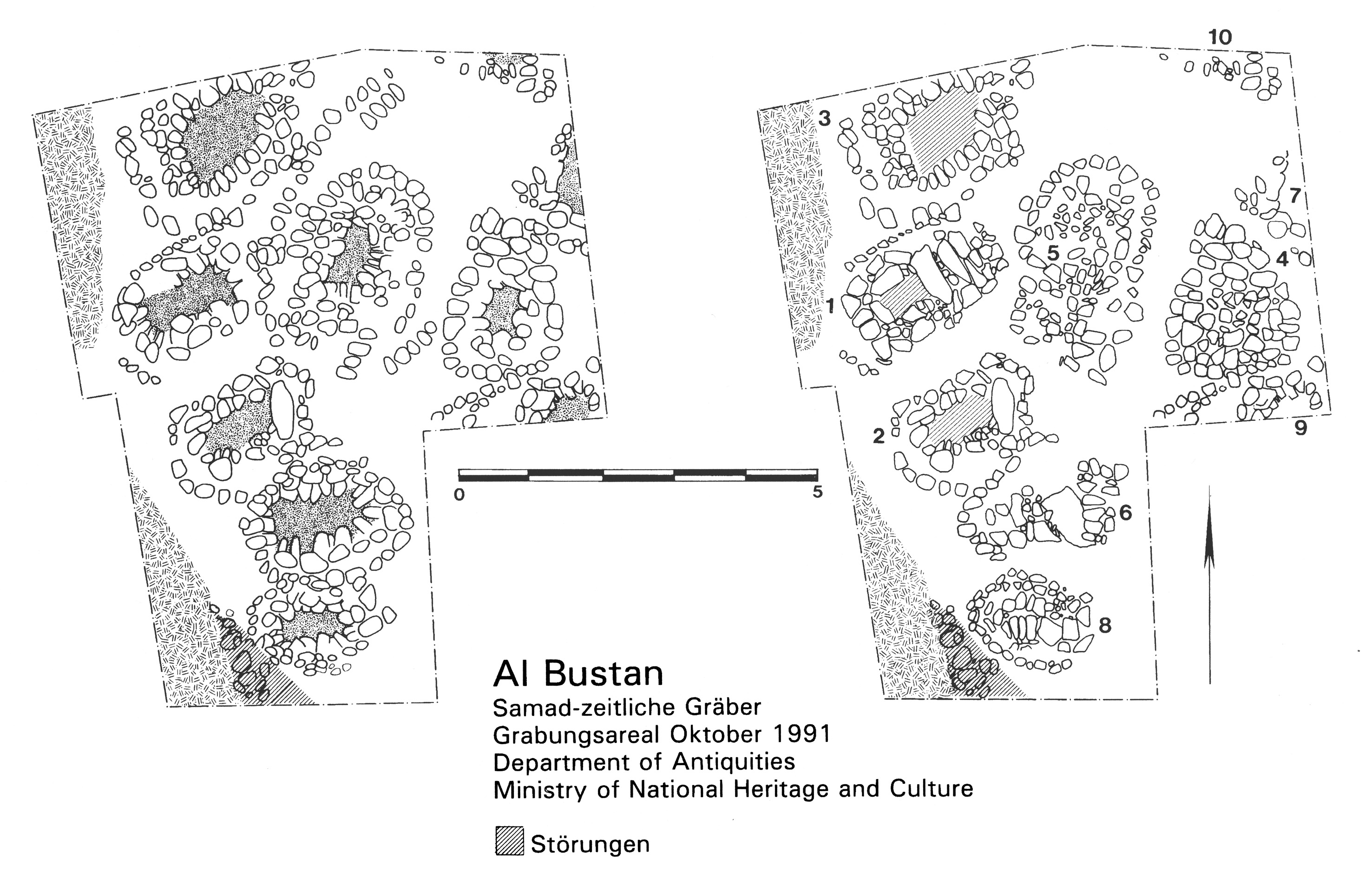
Excavated Late Iron Age graves at al-Bustan, Oman. Left: excavated, right: prior to excavation.

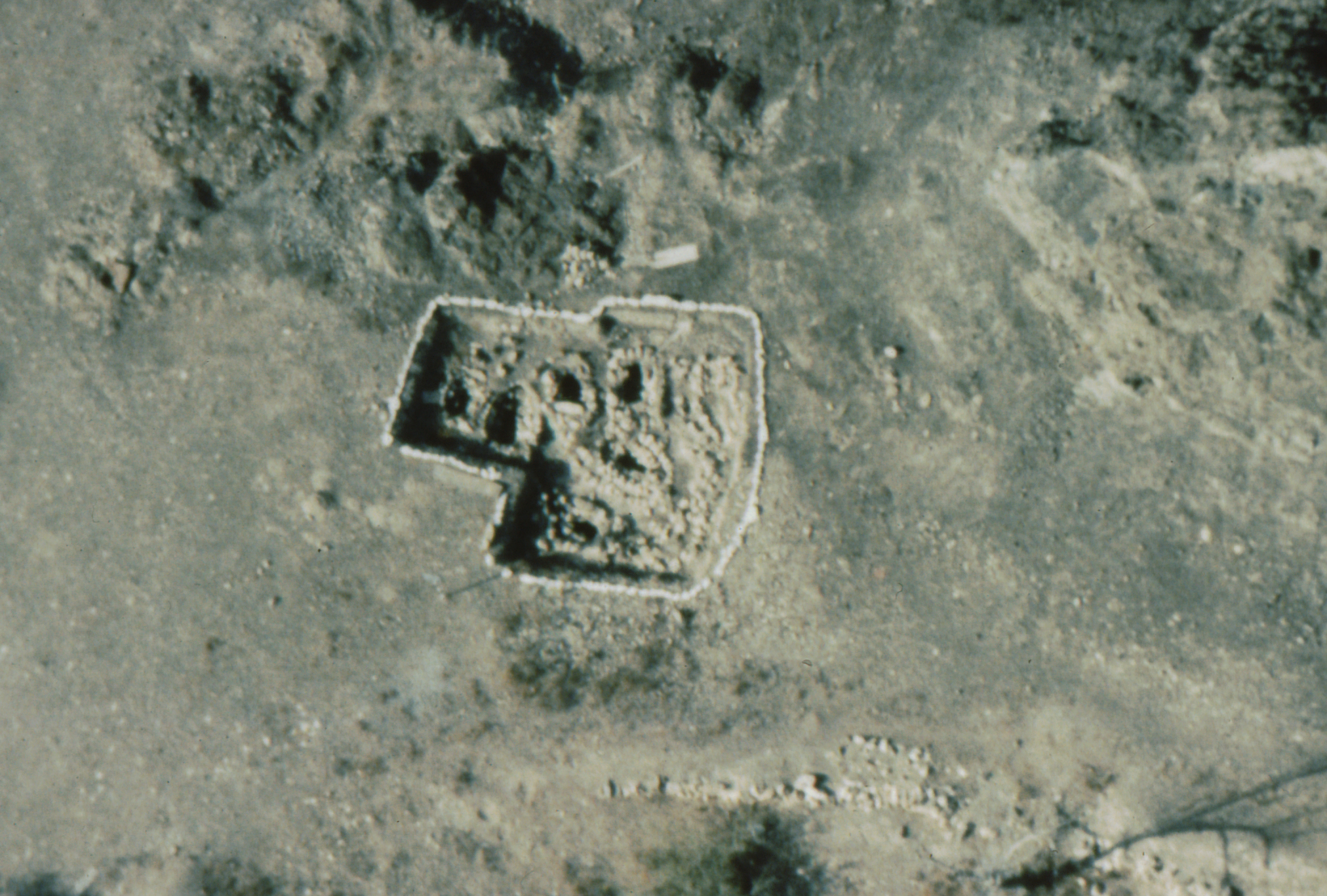
Aerial view of excavated Late Iron Age graves at al-Bustan.

Al Bustān (Arabic: البستان) is a village in Muscat, in eastern Oman (23°34'15.02"; 58°36'32.70"E, 8 m altitude). Its cemetery was used during the Samad Late Iron Age.

== Overview ==
In 1991 the Ministry of National Heritage and Culture became aware of the cemetery, close to the Al-Bustan Palace.

In the same year a team from the German Mining Museum in Bochum excavated seven graves.

== Sources ==
- Paul Yule, Die Gräberfelder in Samad al-Shan (Sultanat Oman): Materialien zu einer Kulturgeschichte (2001), Taf. 482-500 ISBN 3-89646-634-8.
- Paul Yule, Cross-roads – Early and Late Iron Age South-eastern Arabia, Abhandlungen Deutsche Orient-Gesellschaft, vol. 30, Wiesbaden 2014, 89 ISBN 978-3-447-10127-1
- Paul A. Yule, Valourising the Samad Late Iron Age, Arabian Archaeology and Epigraphy 27/1, 2016, 31‒71.

== See also ==
- List of lighthouses in Oman
