= Tulang Bawang =

Tulang Bawang may refer to:

- Tulang Bawang River, in Lampung province, Indonesia
- Tulang Bawang Regency, in Lampung province, Indonesia
- West Tulang Bawang Regency, in Lampung province, Indonesia
