= As Salamah Archipelago =

Archipelago in the Persian Gulf, part of Oman

Coordinates: 26°29′39″N 56°31′45″E

Native name: سلامة وبناتها
- Interactive map of As Salamah Archipelago

Geography
- Location: Strait of Hormuz
- Total islands: 3
- Major islands: Didamar Island

Administration
- Oman
- Governorate: Musandam
- Province: Khasab

Demographics
- Population: uninhabited

The As Salamah Archipelago (Arabic: سلامة وبناتها, romanized: As Salamah wa Banatiha lit. 'Salamah and her daughters'), also known by their colonial name, the Quoin Islands Archipelago, or simply the Quoin Islands, is a archipelago of three uninhabited islands in the Persian Gulf, north of the Musandam Peninsula in the Strait of Hormuz; as part of Oman (Musandam Governorate), they form the country's northernmost landmass. The archipelago is considered the entrance and exit point of the Persian Gulf. Once a ship has declared a position of "Passed Quoin Inbound" the insurance rates for the ship will increase.

== Islands ==
While the islands are currently uninhabited, they were once inhabited by the Bani Shatair.

The archipelago consists of these three islands, each with their native name, their colonial English name, and their position in the chain:

1. Mumar Island (or Great Quoin Island) (west)
2. Fanaku Island (or Gap Island) (middle)
3. Didamar Island (or Little Quoin Island) (east)

The native names for these islands originate from the Shihuh tribe of Musandam, who named the two outer islands Mumar and Didamar, meaning "mother" and "daughter", and the entire archipelago As Salamah wa Banatiha (Arabic: سلامة وبناتها), meaning "Salamah and her daughters". European seafarers later named these islands Great and Little Quoin, after the quoin (wedge) used to elevate ship-borne cannons, while the island in the middle was referred to as Gap Island.

=== Mumar Island ===
Mumar Island is the largest island of the three. The island has a triangular outline, is about 770 metres long and up to 530 meters wide, yielding an area of about 22 hectares, it has a height of 164 meters.

=== Didamar Island ===
Didamar Island features a Lighthouse named Didamar Light (the colonial name being Quoin Islands Lighthouse), it's the oldest Lighthouse in Oman, being built by the British in 1914. The lighthouse is a 24-meter square pyramidal skeletal tower with a concrete base, constructed from metal, painted white, and powered by solar energy, with a focal height of 60 meters, a range of 23 nautical miles (43 km), and a light characteristic of two white flashes every 10 seconds. Didamar Island has a height of 51 meters.

== Gallery ==
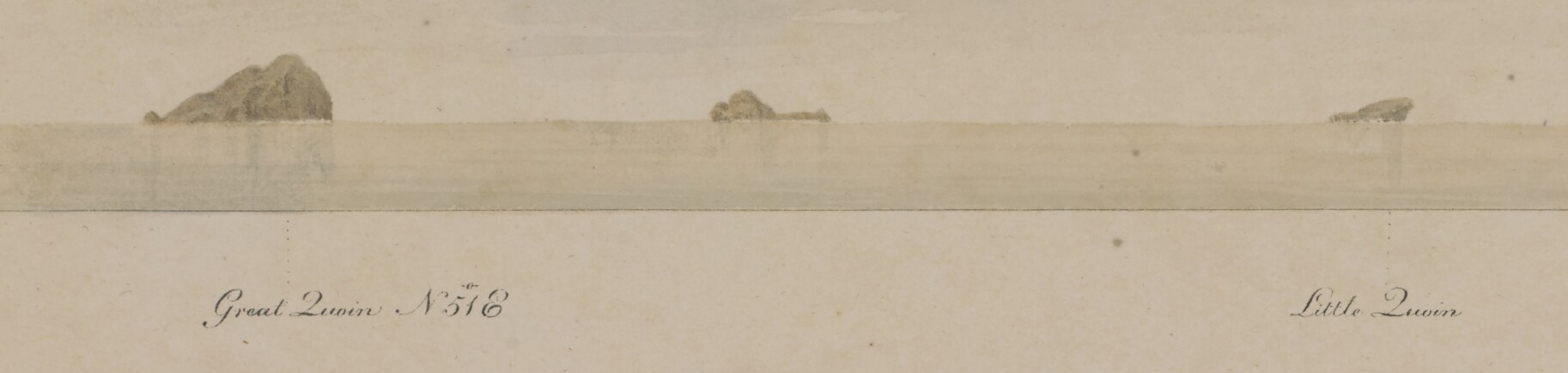
The archipelago drawn from west to east sometime before 1825. Fanaku (Gap) Island is unnamed.

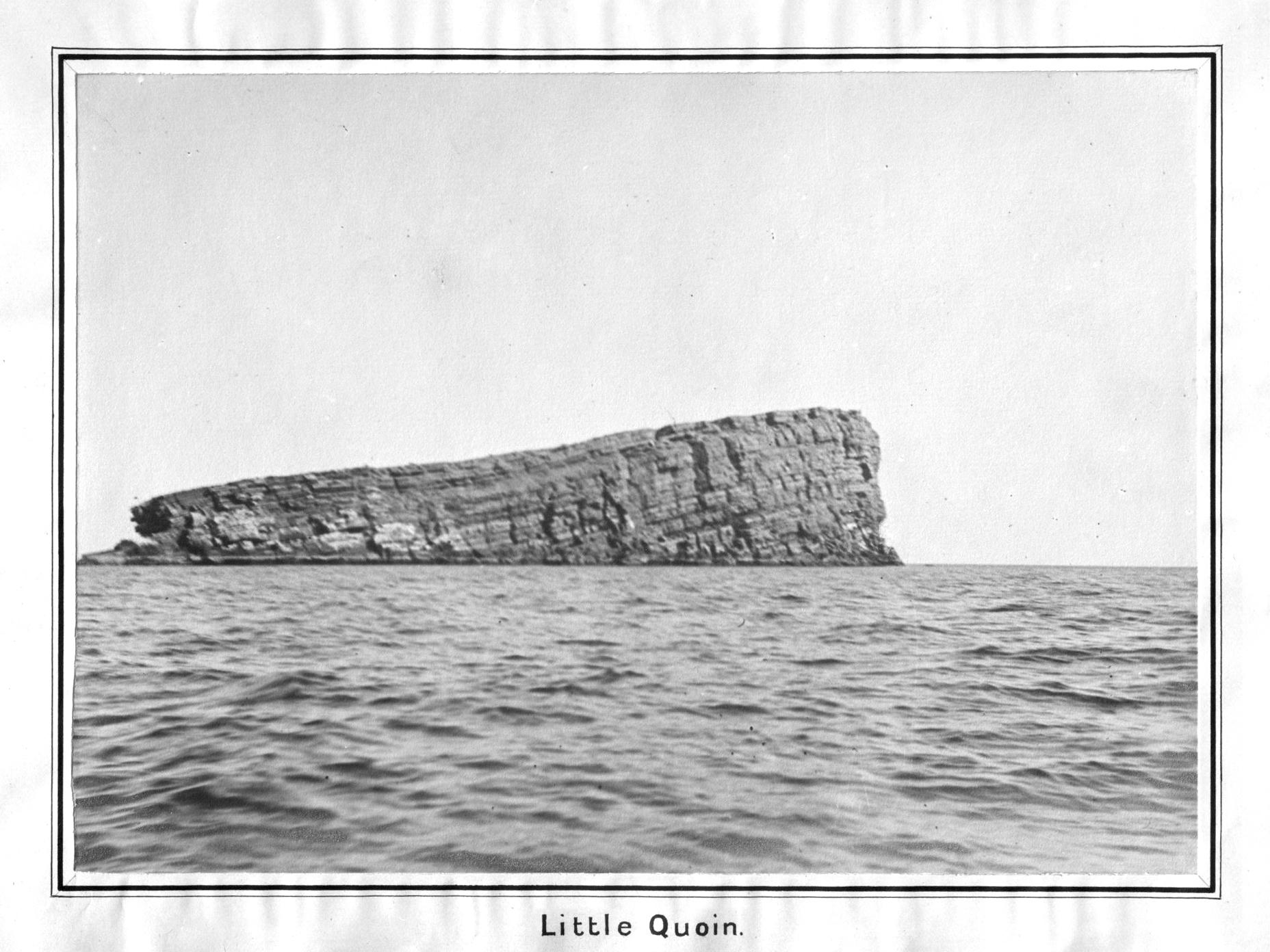
Didamar Island (Little Quoin) in 1909, before its lighthouse was built

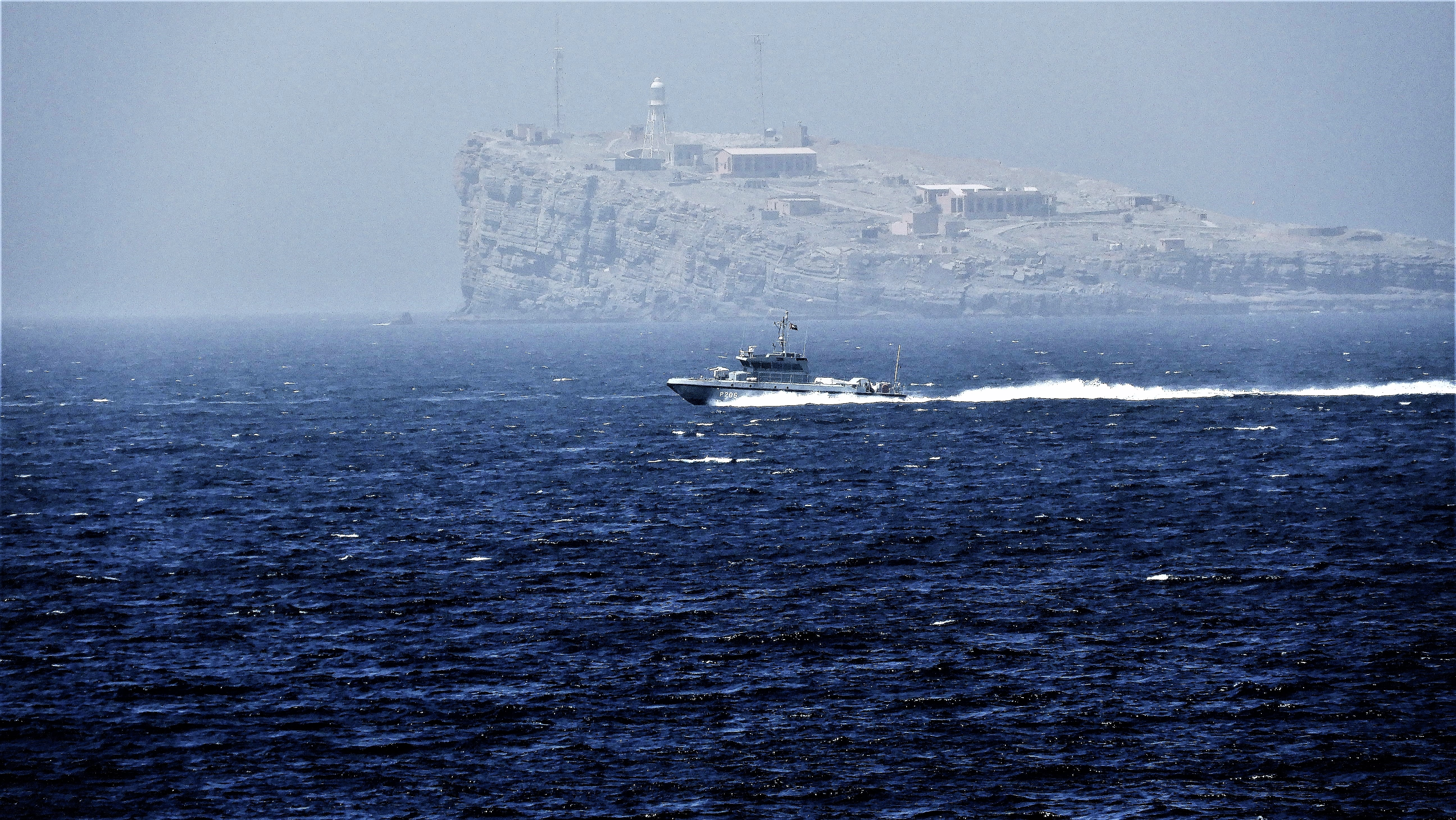
Didamar Island in 2018, with the lighthouse complex
