= Ad Dimaniyat Islands =

Protected islands in Oman

- Daymaniyat Islands
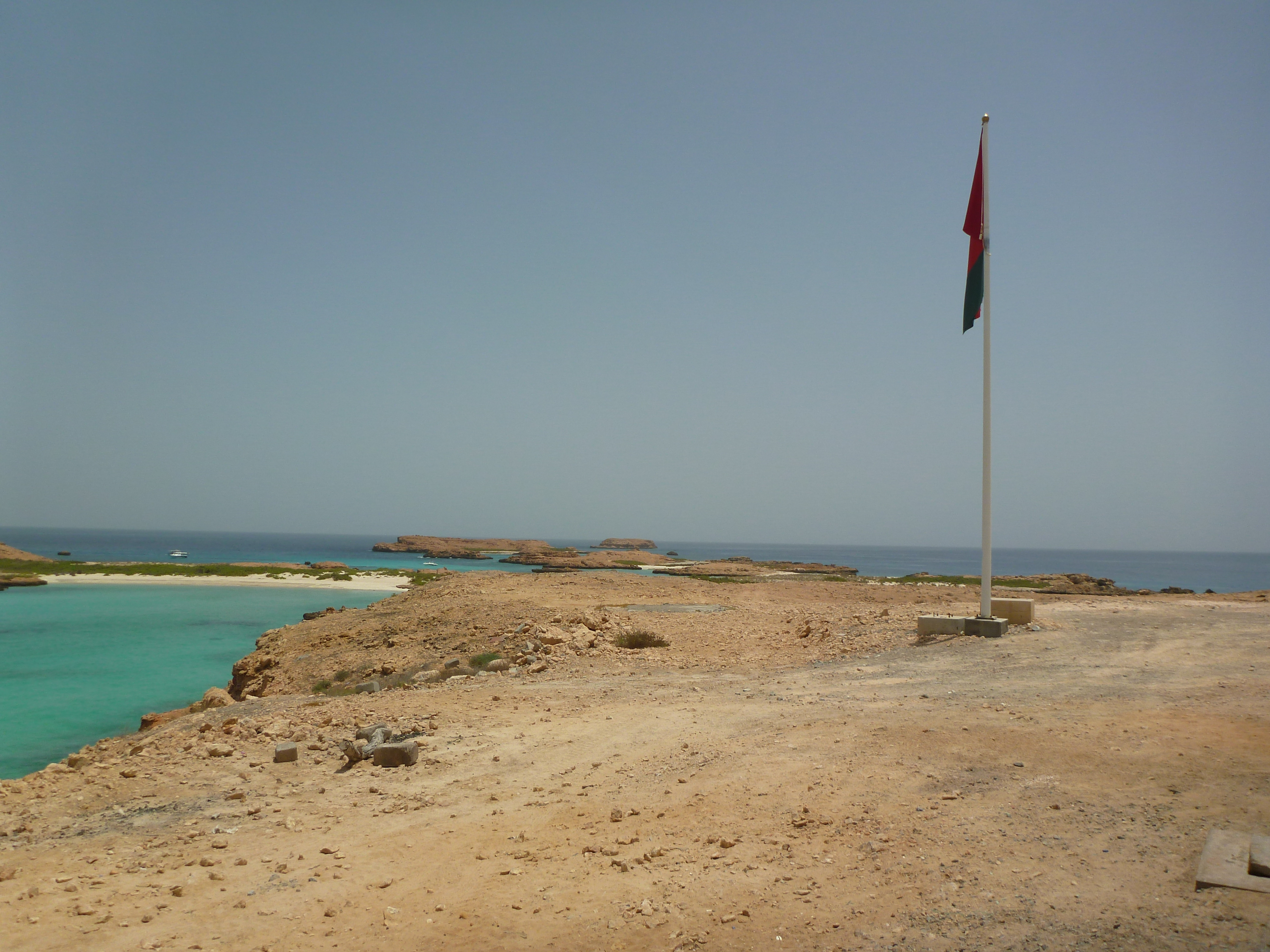

- Location within Oman
- Location: Muscat Governorate, Oman
- Nearest city: Barka
- Coordinates: 23.856°N 58.075°E
- Area: 100 ha (250 acres)
- Juzor Ad Dimaniyat Lighthouse
- Foundation: concrete base
- Construction: metal skeletal tower
- Height: 16 m (52 ft)
- Shape: square pyramidal skeletal tower
- Power source: solar power
- Focal height: 31 m (102 ft)
- Range: 15 nmi (28 km; 17 mi)
- Characteristic: Fl W 10s

The Ad Dimaniyat Islands (Arabic: جزر الديمانيات) are a protected area in the Gulf of Oman.

== History ==
The islands are mentioned in the Periplus of the Erythraean Sea as the Calaei Islands being derived from Kalhat, a former major Phoenician trade city north of Sur that acted as a last stop for trade to and from Arabia and India. It is suggested that the natives of the city migrated to Kalat which shares a similar name.

== Geography ==
The Nature Reserve is located in Wilayat AlSeeb in the Muscat Governorate and lies about 18 kilometres (11 mi) off the coast of Barka (70 kilometres (43 mi) west of Muscat, the capital). It is composed of nine islands with a total area of 100 hectares (250 acres). Locally, the islands go by the names Kharabah, Huyoot, Al Jabal Al Kabeer (Um As Sakan). The latter is divided into two islands: Um Al Liwahah (Minaret) and Al Jawn, which includes three islands.

== Environment ==
The reserve has a rich natural heritage with several kinds of coral reefs, including some examples that are quite rare. The island is home to a large number of sea turtles that lay their eggs and nest there, as well as being a magnet for migratory and resident birds.

=== Important Bird Area ===
The archipelago has been designated an Important Bird Area (IBA) by BirdLife International because it supports breeding sooty gulls, bridled, roseate and white-cheeked terns, as well as sooty falcons. Green and hawksbill sea turtles nest on the beaches.

== Access ==
Fans of camping and diving now pay more for their satisfaction, after the decree of the Ministry of Environmental Protection and Climate Affairs. Expatriates pay OMR10, while locals pay OMR5. Before the new rule, everyone paid OMR1 for entering the islands, OMR3 for diving, OMR5 for camping or OMR7 for the whole package.

Under the new law, non-Omanis will have to pay OMR3 per day for a visit, OMR6 for diving and OMR10 for diving and overnight camping. Approval of the Ministry of Environmental Protection and Climate Affairs is required to visit the islands, which was also the case with the previous law. Stay on the island is allowed for a maximum of 5 days, and the number in the group must not exceed 12 people.

== See also ==
- List of lighthouses in Oman

== Literature ==
- DAIMĀNIYĀT (ديمانيات), in: Gazetteer of the Persian Gulf, Oman and Central Arabia Online, Edited by: Brill. Consulted online on 10 July 2018 <https://dx.doi.org/10.1163/2405-447X_loro_COM_040131>

First published online: 2015 (online scan, online text)
