= Ras al Hadd =

Ra's al-Hadd رَأْس ٱلْحَدّ
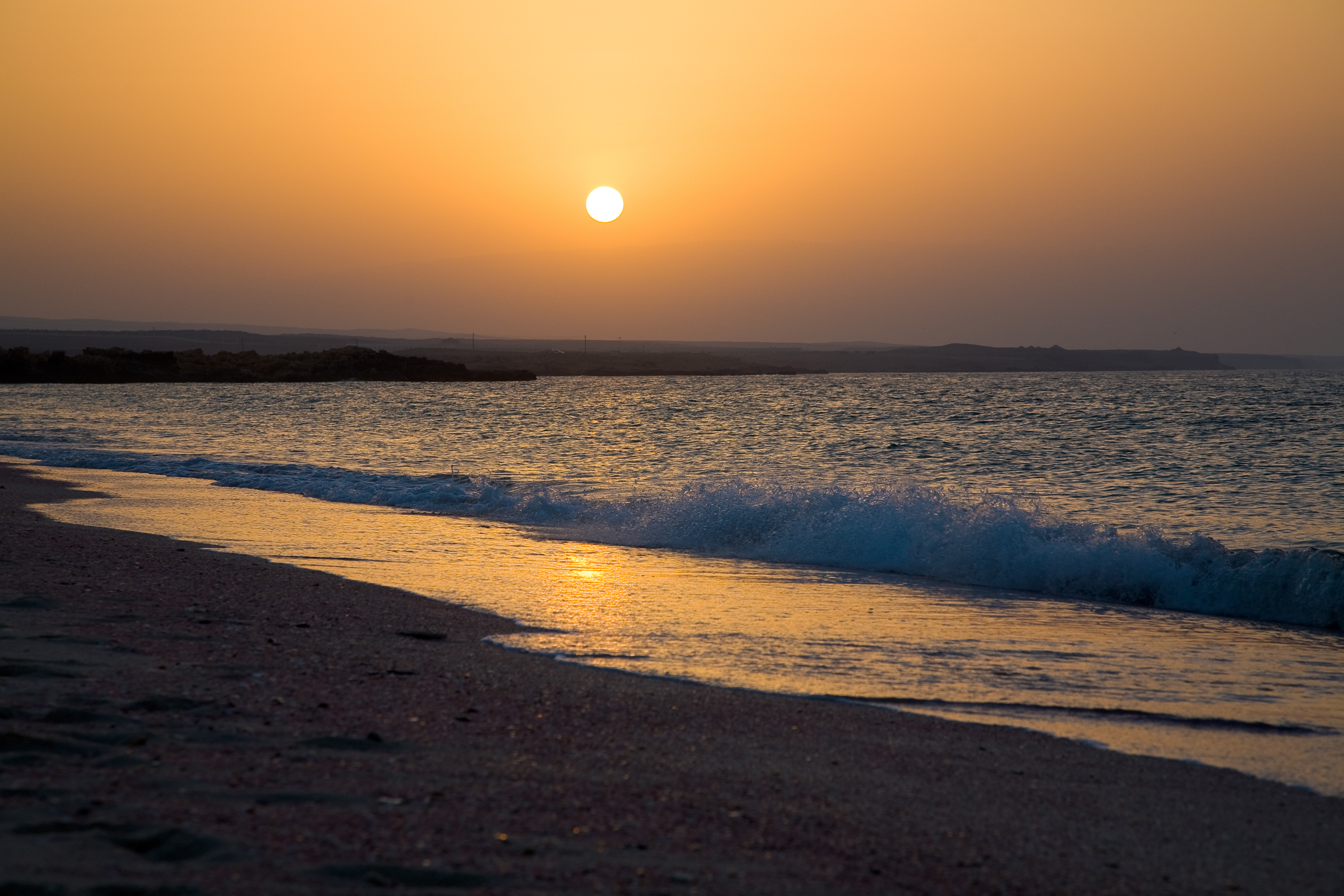
- Sunset in Ras al Hadd

- Oman
- Coordinates: 22°31′59.1″N 59°47′53.9″E

Raʾs al-Ḥadd (Arabic: رَأْس ٱلْحَدّ) is a village in Ash Sharqiyah district in Oman. It is on a point at the entrance to the Gulf of Oman.

The region is served by Ras al Hadd Airport.

== Geography ==
Al-Hajar Mountains are located to the west.

The beaches at Ras al Hadd and nearby Ra's al-Jinz are known as a breeding ground for green sea turtles.

== Indian intelligence radar ==
There is an Indian listening post at Ras al Hadd, and berthing rights for the Indian Navy at Muscat naval base.

== Landmarks ==
=== Ras Al Jinz Turtle Reserve ===
The easternmost peninsula in Oman hosts one of the most important populations of green turtles in the Indian Ocean, according to UNESCO. Throughout the year, they haul their weight of up to 190 kilograms from the sea at Ras Al Jinz to lay their eggs.

On 23 April 1996, Ras Al Jinz Turtle Reserve is designated as a nature reserve.

=== Shopping ===
Located at the heart of Ras Al Hadd is the area's first shopping centre, Alfouz Hypermarket, which opened on 10 May 2018. The mall caters to the shopping needs of the people of Ras Al Hadd and also to tourists, with items from groceries to swimwear.

== See also ==
- Eastern Arabia
- Defence cooperation between Oman and India
- List of lighthouses in Oman
