= Gulf of Masirah =

Coordinates: 19°55′N 58°05′E

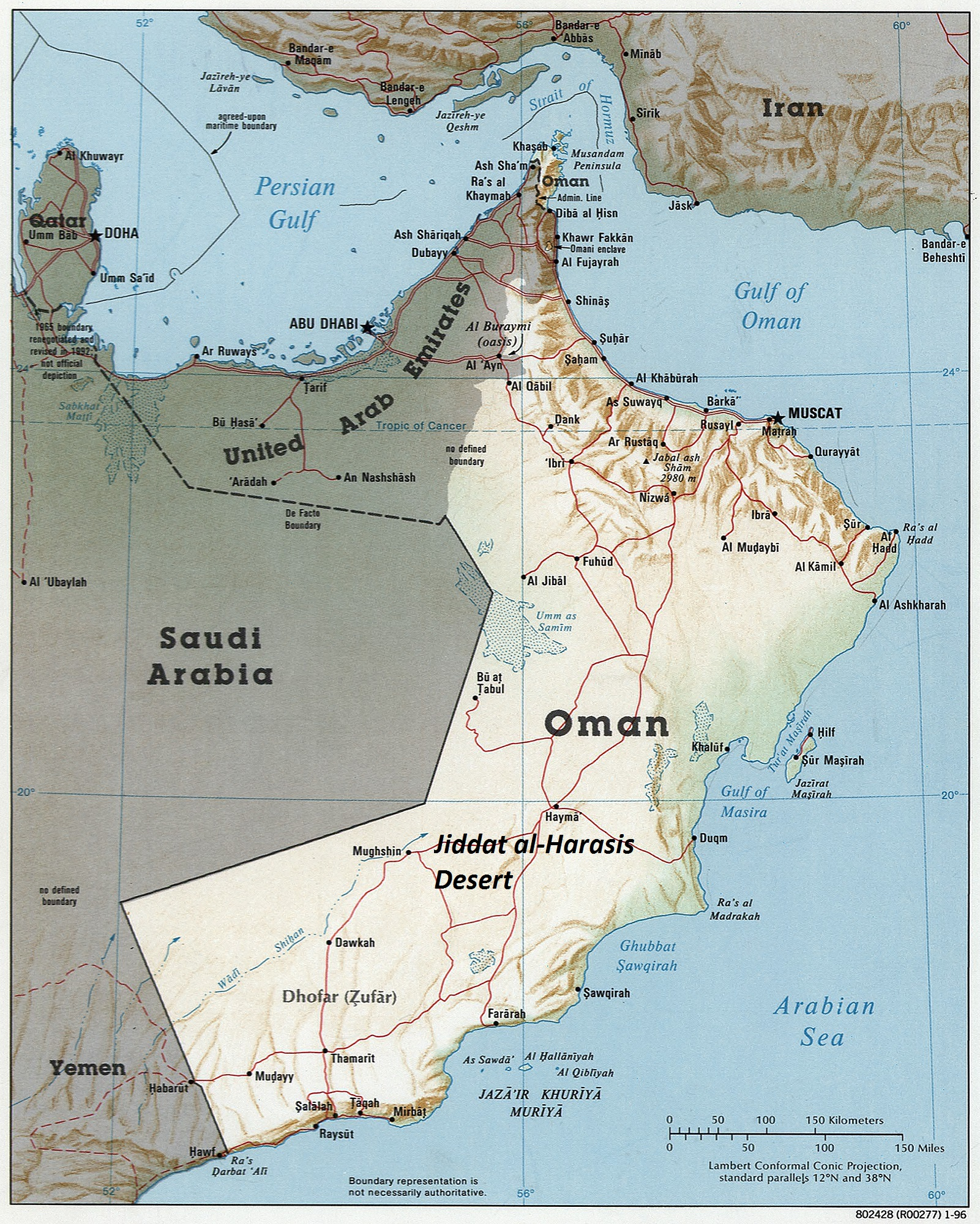
Location in Oman

The Gulf of Masirah (Arabic: بحر الحدري, romanized: Baḥr al-Ḥadrī, literally the "Lower Sea") is a gulf or sea between the Arabian Sea and the eastern coast of Oman south of the Masirah Island and north of Raʾs Madrakah. In some maps, the Gulf of Masirah is labelled Khalīj Maṣīrah (Arabic: خليج مصيرة, literally the Masirah Bay), but in the official map of Oman, that is the name of the Masirah Channel.
