= Masirah Island =

Omani island

Masirah
Native name: مَصِيْرَة
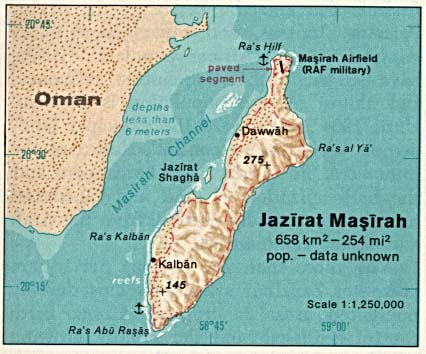

- Location within Oman Masirah Island (Middle East)

Geography
- Location: Arabian Sea
- Coordinates: 20°28′16″N 58°48′55″E
- Area: 649 km^{2} (251 sq mi)
- Length: 95 km (59 mi)
- Width: 12–14 km (7.5–8.7 mi)
- Highest elevation: 256 m (840 ft)
- Highest point: Jabal Madrub

Administration
- Oman
- Governorate: Ash Sharqiyah South Governorate
- Province: Masirah
- Largest settlement: Ras-Hilf

Demographics
- Population: 15,945
- Pop. density: 24.57/km^{2} (63.64/sq mi)

Masirah Island (Arabic: جَزِيْرَة مَصِيْرَة, romanized: Jazīrat Maṣīrah), also referred to as Mazeira Island, is an island off the east coast of mainland Oman in the Arabian Sea, and the largest island of the country. Administratively, it forms one of the five provinces (Wilayah, plural Wilayat) of the Ash Sharqiyah South Governorate, namely Wilāyat Maṣīrah (Arabic: وِلَايَة مَصِيْرَة); previously it was a province of the Ash Sharqiyah Region.

Masirah is 95 km (59 miles) long north–south, between 12 and 14 km (7.5 and 8.7 miles) wide, with an area of about 649 km^{2}, and a population estimated at 12,000 in 12 villages mainly in the north of the island (9,292 as of the census of 2003, of which were 2,311 foreigners). It is divided from the mainland by the Masirah Channel. Most of the island's interior is deserted, with access to the island possible by ferry on National Ferries Company (NFC) or smaller privately owned ferries for cars and passengers. Salam Air also flies to Masirah weekly.

The principal village of Wilayat Masirah is Raʾs-Ḥilf (Arabic: رَأْس حِلْف) in the northern part of the island. It contains a Royal Air Force of Oman air base and a fish factory, as well as a few small towns. Previously, the BBC had a relay facility consisting of both HF and MF broadcasting transmitters stationed there. The main industries are fishing and traditional textile manufacturing. Formerly, traditional shipbuilding was important.

== Geography ==
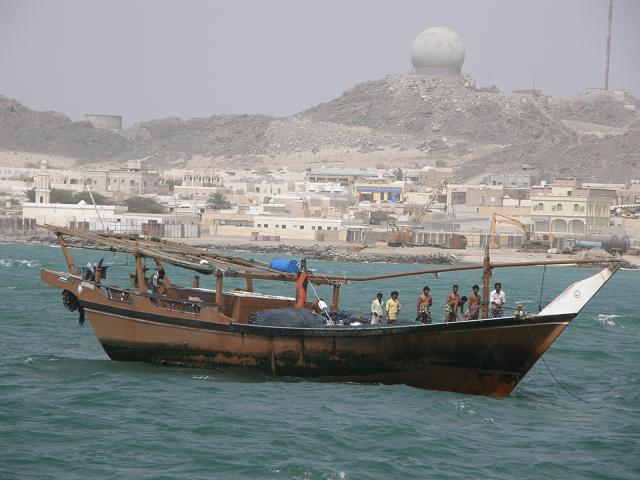
A dhow with the island in the background

Masirah Lighthouse
- Location: Masirah Island, Oman
- Coordinates: 20°10′17″N 58°38′23″E

Tower
- Constructed: 2014
- Construction: concrete (foundation), fiberglass (tower)
- Height: 10 m (33 ft)
- Shape: cylinder
- Markings: Stripe (red and white, horizontal orientation)
- Power source: solar power

Light
- Focal height: 89 m (292 ft)
- Characteristic: Fl W 10s

Located about 19 km (12 miles) off the east side of Barr al Hikman, the island is generally hilly, especially on its east side. The hills along the east side of the island are separated from the island coast by a narrow sandy plain; they run nearly its entire length. A steep plateau stands in the middle of the range on the northeast side of the island. Along the west side of the island, there are a few low hills separated from the east range by an extensive sandy plain marked by several hillocks:

- Jabal Madrub, a 256 m (840 ft) high mountain, stands about 13 km (8.1 miles) south of the north end of the island.
- Ras Abu Rasas, the south extremity of Al Masirah, is low and rocky. Jabal Suwayr (Jabal al Hilm), a conspicuous conical hill, rises to a height of 153 m (502 ft), about 3 km (1.9 miles) north-northeast of Ras Abu Rasas. It houses the Masirah lighthouse.
- Ras Kaydah, a small and rocky headland, has a conspicuous, conical hill about 20 m (66 ft) high nearby. There are small islets 600 m (2,000 ft) east and 4 km (2.5 miles) north of Ras Kayda.
- The coast between Ras Kaydah and Ras Zafaranat, about 27 km (17 miles) to the northeast, is regular with a few small rounded projections and a low rocky beach. Haql (Hakkan), a small village in a grove of trees, lies close to the shore about eight km north of Ras Kaydah.
- Ras Zafaranat is rocky with hills rising abruptly. Between Ras Abu Rasas and Ras Kaydah, about 18 km (11 miles) to the northeast, the coast is indented by small, sandy bays fringed by rocks.
- Ras al-Ya, about 3 km (1.9 miles) northeast of Ras Zafaranat, is the east extremity of the island and consists of a prominent bluff rising to a ridge of hills which extend westward to the center of the island. A conspicuous peak, 99 m (325 ft) high, stands about 3 km (1.9 miles) west-northwest of Ras al-Ya.
- Jabal Madrub rises about 5 km (3.1 miles) farther west-northwest.
- Ras al-Jazirah, about six km north-northwest of Ras al-Ya, is rocky and well-marked by a black patch on its south side. A sharp peak, rising to a height of 95 m (312 ft), stands about 3 km (1.9 miles) west of this point.
- Jazirat Thukhayr, a sandy islet close north of Ras al-Jazirah, lies on a drying reef connected to the shore. Drying rocks extend up to 300 m (980 ft) off the eastern extremity of the islet.
- The coast between Ras al Jazirah and Ras Qudufah, the northeast extremity of the island, about 11 km (6.8 miles) further north-northwest, is indented by a bay. Ras Qudufah, consisting of two rocky projections about 800 m (2,600 ft) apart, rises to Jabal al-Jidufa, about 64 m (210 ft) high, a short distance inland. A cairn stands on a hill close south of Jabal al-Jidufa, and a small monument stands close southwest of Ras Qudufah.

=== Landscape ===
The rugged terrain of the island and surrounding rough coastline has led to the appearance of many wrecked dhows on the beaches of the island, most of them well preserved by the salt water and intense heat. On 21 September 1835, the USS Peacock grounded on a coral reef.

The ocean bottom environment surrounding Masirah is hostile as the majority of the area is covered in either sand or hard rock. There is a swift current flowing through the area with a very sharp halocline visible on the surface of the ocean. The water depth nearby is around 10 m and is not conducive to side-scan sonar searches due to the shallow water and choppy surface conditions. Despite the poor quality ocean bottom, the area is very productive with marine fisheries, and any hard objects (barrels, engines) are immediately colonised by local fauna.

During summer there is normally a constant strong wind which is ideal for kite and windsurfers. Big waves are a result of the wind on the sea side and is so also attractive for wave surfers. Kite and windsurfers can pick spots around the island according to their skill and what conditions they prefer. On 5–6 June 2007, 7000 people on the island were forced to temporarily leave their homes due to the high storm waves produced by the powerful Cyclone Gonu, the strongest to hit the Persian Gulf region in 60 years.

=== Ecology ===
The island is an important hatching ground for loggerhead sea turtles, similar in importance to the beaches at Ras al Hadd and nearby Ras al-Jinz as a hatching ground for green sea turtles. A critically endangered local population of humpback whales also migrate in the waters surrounding the island and Masirah gulf. The island has been designated an Important Bird Area (IBA) by BirdLife International because it supports many species of waders and seabirds, as well as Egyptian vultures.

=== Climate ===
Saiq has a hot desert climate (Köppen climate classification BWh) with hot summers and warm winters. Precipitation is low, and falls mainly from February to April as well as in the brief monsoon season from June to August.

Climate data for Masirah Island (1991–2020 normals, extremes 1980–2023)
Month	Jan	Feb	Mar	Apr	May	Jun	Jul	Aug	Sep	Oct	Nov	Dec	Year
Record high °C (°F)	32.4 (90.3)	35.7 (96.3)	40.6 (105.1)	42.7 (108.9)	45.0 (113.0)	47.2 (117.0)	41.6 (106.9)	41.4 (106.5)	39.5 (103.1)	41.5 (106.7)	37.0 (98.6)	32.2 (90.0)	47.2 (117.0)
Mean daily maximum °C (°F)	26.6 (79.9)	27.7 (81.9)	30.4 (86.7)	34.1 (93.4)	36.0 (96.8)	34.9 (94.8)	32.1 (89.8)	31.1 (88.0)	31.5 (88.7)	32.6 (90.7)	30.3 (86.5)	27.8 (82.0)	31.3 (88.3)
Daily mean °C (°F)	23.0 (73.4)	23.6 (74.5)	26.1 (79.0)	29.7 (85.5)	31.6 (88.9)	30.8 (87.4)	28.3 (82.9)	27.5 (81.5)	27.8 (82.0)	28.3 (82.9)	26.8 (80.2)	24.3 (75.7)	27.3 (81.2)
Mean daily minimum °C (°F)	19.2 (66.6)	19.6 (67.3)	21.6 (70.9)	24.9 (76.8)	27.0 (80.6)	26.5 (79.7)	24.4 (75.9)	23.6 (74.5)	24.0 (75.2)	24.0 (75.2)	23.2 (73.8)	21.0 (69.8)	23.3 (73.9)
Record low °C (°F)	8.9 (48.0)	11.2 (52.2)	13.4 (56.1)	16.3 (61.3)	19.6 (67.3)	21.6 (70.9)	19.2 (66.6)	19.0 (66.2)	19.5 (67.1)	18.5 (65.3)	15.4 (59.7)	9.4 (48.9)	8.9 (48.0)
Average precipitation mm (inches)	7.5 (0.30)	16.3 (0.64)	12.5 (0.49)	10.2 (0.40)	1.5 (0.06)	21.1 (0.83)	11.6 (0.46)	9.9 (0.39)	0.4 (0.02)	0.0 (0.0)	1.2 (0.05)	6.9 (0.27)	99.1 (3.91)
Average relative humidity (%)	68	70	71	67	69	73	78	79	78	71	69	67	72
Mean monthly sunshine hours	287.2	259.1	297.3	311.2	346.6	268.6	238.1	248.0	283.6	317.9	299.5	288.9	3,446
Source 1: NOAA (precipitation, humidity and sun 1980-1990)
Source 2: Starlings Roost Weather

== History ==
Neolithic, Bronze Age and Iron Age archaeological sites are dotted over the island, with one study finding shell middens dating to 6000BC, stone axes from 3000BC and fish line sinkers from 4000BC The Magan Civilization was present, with archaeological records from 2000-2700BC, Indus region pottery shards, and local copper mining in small quantities around 1500BC.

The Periplus of the Erythraean Sea, a periplus dated to between AD 40 and 70 describes Masirah island, then called Isle of Serapis:

After sailing along it over open water for about 2000 stades from the Isles of Zenobios, you come to the Isle of Sarapis, as it is called, about 120 stades offshore. It is some 200 stades wide and 600 long and is populated by three villages and by holy men of the Ichthyophagi. They use the Arabic tongue and wear loincloths of palm leaves. The island has good supplies of fine-quality tortoise shell.

— Periplus of the Erythraean Sea, §33

There was occupation by the Portuguese navy in the sixteenth century. The modern history of the island is little researched, but it is known that the fishermen were accomplished sailors, constructed their own boats, and trade with the mainland was well advanced. In the 1950s the sheikh lived on the East coast at Ra's al Ya.

=== Military base ===
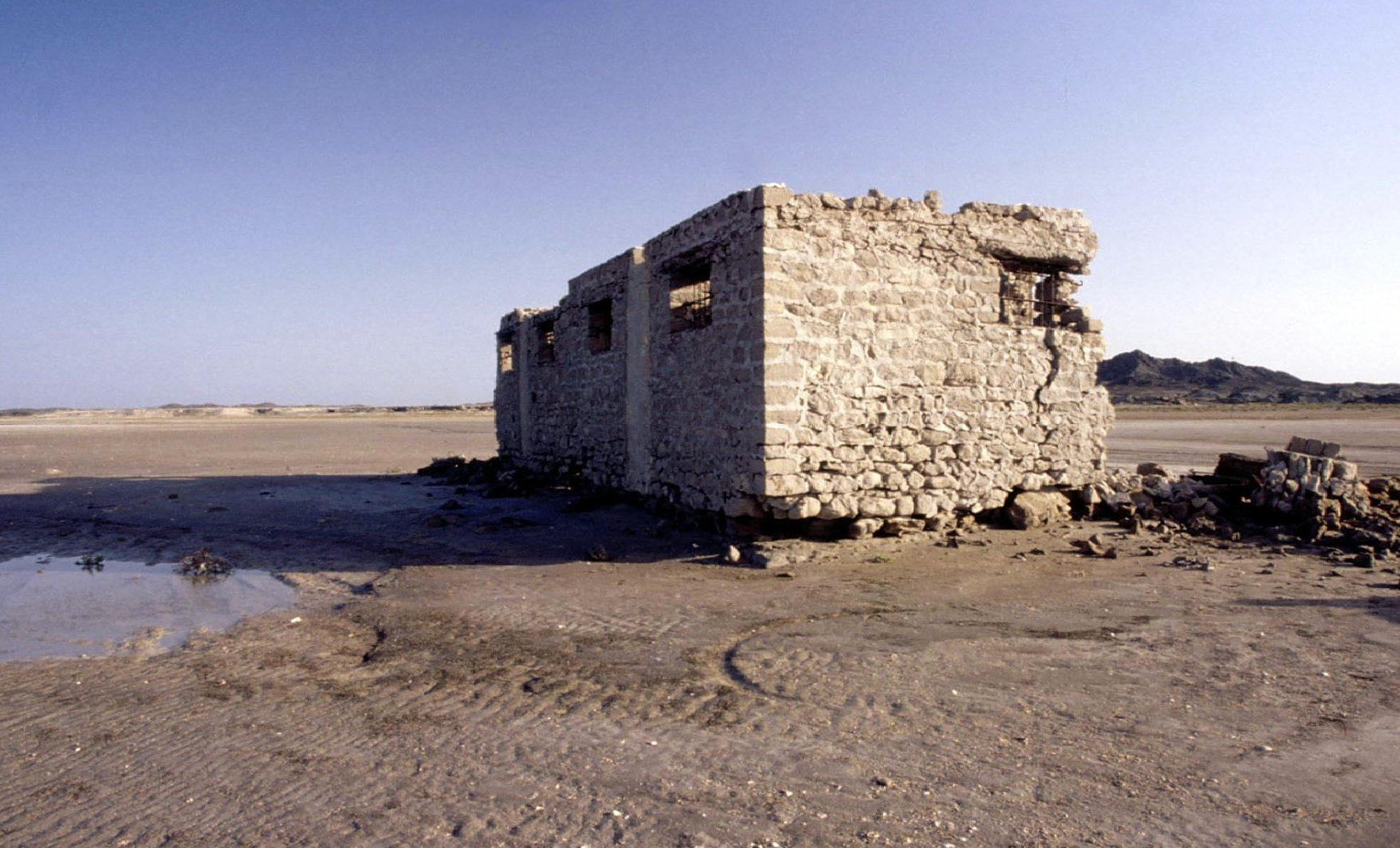
The remains of the RAF fuel store on Masirah Island in 1984

The British established a military presence on Masirah in the 1930s. A small stone building, a fuel store for land based aircraft flying between Aden and Muscat, stood at the midpoint of the island on the west side, and had a stone above the door inscribed "RAF 1936".

A dispute between British forces and the local inhabitants took place in 1942, led by one of two local sheikhs, who were eventually forced to flee the island.

During WW II, The British paid the Sultan of Muscat a stipend of £18,000 per annum for affording British forces 'necessary facilities', which included Masirah. A Cabinet Office memorandum of 1945 recommended the acquisition of Masirah on a 99-year lease, US interests in the island notwithstanding (During World War II the United States also had a base on the island.). The Sultan was to be offered an annual payment of £3,750 with an initial premium of £7,500. The base continued to expand into the 1970s, supporting British and Oman forces fighting insurgents during the Dhofar Rebellion and providing transit facilities for long-distance RAF flights.

The British military presence at RAF Masirah extended until 31 March 1977, when Sultan of Oman's Air Force (now the Royal Air Force of Oman) took over the base, which became first SOAF Masirah and then RAFO Masirah. In the 1970s, the base included a HF communications hub and a rear link to SAS units and British Royal Engineer Units based in Oman in support of the actions against rebels in the south of the country (RAF Salalah). United States' units used Masirah Island as a staging base in Operation Eagle Claw, the unsuccessful 1980 attempt to free US hostages then held in Iran. The island was subsequently used as a staging area for operations into Afghanistan in 2001.

As of 2009, the American private military contractor DynCorp had a contract to staff and serve a US military storage-depot at this base.

=== Radio Relay Station ===
In 1966 Masirah took on a new role, it became the base for the British Middle East Relay Station. This was built by the British Diplomatic Wireless Service to be a relay station for the World Service of the BBC. The station had been previously based in Somalia and Perim called the East Africa Relay Station. These stations were both closed as the politics of the region changed. The station was badly damaged by a Hurricane in 1976 but was rebuilt and handed over to the BBC in 1985.

== Economy ==
Historically, the island had copper ore mining dating back to the Bronze Age. The fishing industry, building on a long tradition, is centered on the north coast, and includes a fish processing plant.

=== Tourism ===
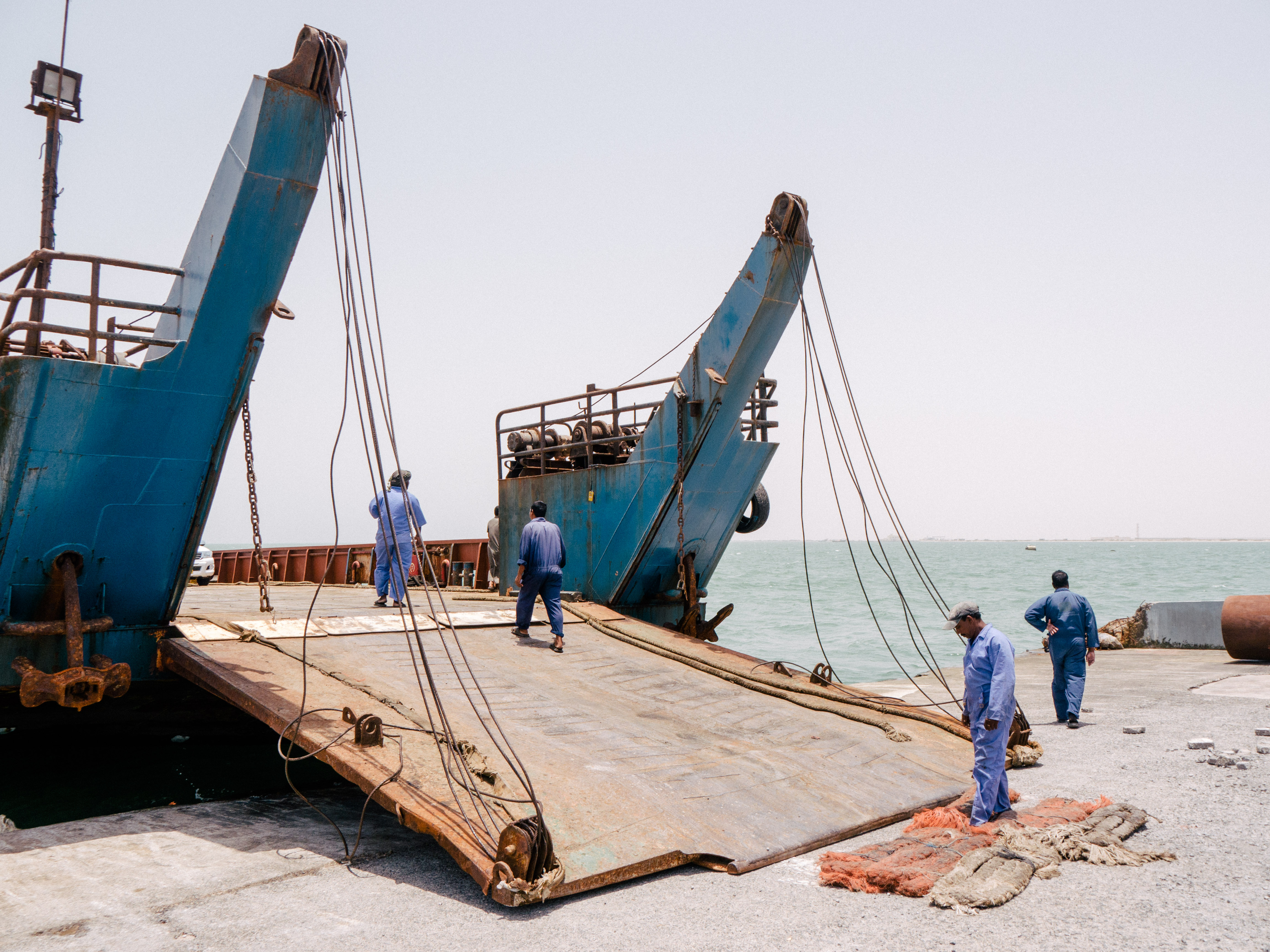
Ferry preparing to sail for Masirah Island

Masirah Island opened for tourism in the 1990s. One can still only get to the island by ferry, managed by the National Ferry Company, which runs six times a day between Shannah to Masirah.

There are hotels and a kitesurfing camp. For kitesurfers, Masirah is an attractive spot in summer because of the monsoon winds which blow steadily at over 20 knots (37 km/h; 23 mph). Rental cars are available on the island.

== See also ==
- Duqm
- List of lighthouses in Oman
- Socotra, another hilly/mountainous island off the coast of the Horn of Africa

== Bibliography ==
- Schoff, Wilfred Harvey, ed. (1912), The Periplus of the Erythraean Sea: Travel and Trade in the Indian Ocean by a Merchant of the First Century, New York: Longmans, Green ISBN 978-81-215-0699-1.
