= Masirah Channel =

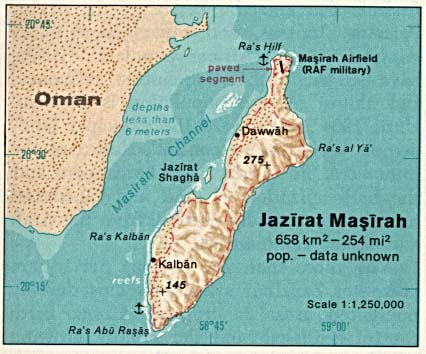

Masirah Channel or Masirah Bay (Arabic: خليج مصيرة, romanized: Khalīj Maṣīrah) is a channel between Barr al-Hikman and Masirah Island in eastern Oman. Its southern end is a better entrance for ships, because the northwestern part of the channel close to the mainland is very shallow, and at low tide it becomes largely dry, restricting the navigable width of the northern end to less than 500 m, making the channel more bay-like.
