= Jürgen Kretschmann =

German economist

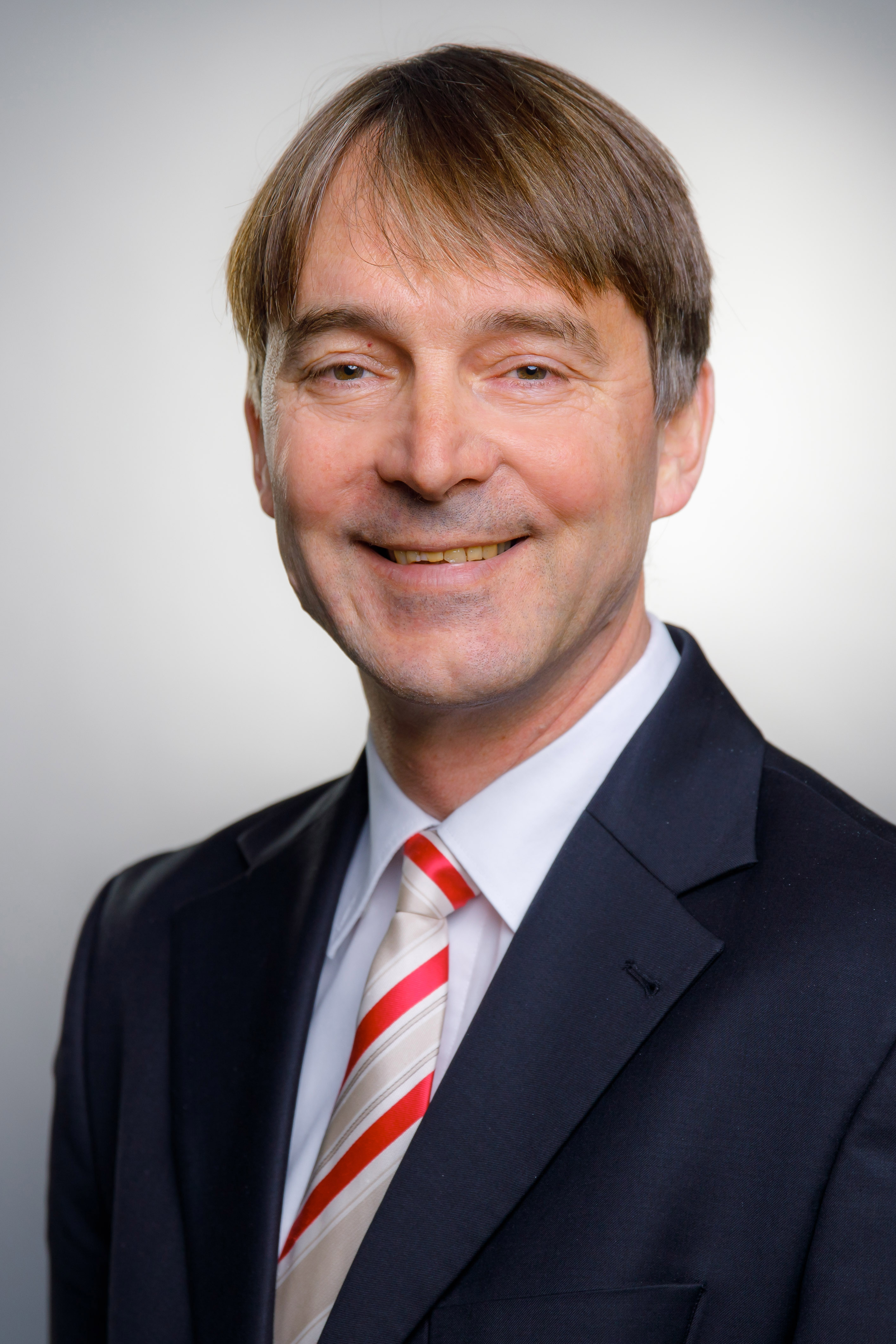
Jürgen Kretschmann (2017)

Jürgen Kretschmann (born April 16, 1959) is a German economist and university president.

Born and raised in Gelsenkirchen, Kretschmann completed his secondary education at the Max Planck Gymnasium. After studying business administration in Aachen, Bochum and Dortmund, he was awarded a doctoral degree in Economics (Dr. rer. pol.) in Göttingen in 1990. His habilitation followed at the RWTH Aachen University in 1998, specialising in georesources and materials science, after which he worked as a lecturer. In 2005, Jürgen Kretschmann was appointed Adjunct Professor at RWTH.

From 1990 to 2001, Kretschmann held various management positions at Ruhrkohle AG, most recently as personal advisor to the Deputy Chairman of the Executive Board and Labour Director of the RAG. In 2001, he joined RAG BILDUNG GmbH as a member of the management board. Since 2006, he is chairperson of the management board of DMT-Gesellschaft für Lehre und Bildung GmbH and president of the Technische Hochschule Georg Agricola University in Bochum.

Kretschmann is a member of numerous national and international professional bodies, currently (2018/19) President of the Society of Mining Professors – Societät der Bergbaukunde. He is also a member of the National Academy of Mining Sciences of Kazakhstan and a member of the Section Mining-Metallurgy of the International Academy of Ecology, Man and Nature Protection Science in Russia.

== Publications (selection) ==
- Die Diffusion des Kritischen Rationalismus in der Betriebswirtschaftslehre. Stuttgart Poeschel 1990 (Betriebswirtschaftliche Abhandlungen, N.F., 83).
- Grundzüge der Organisationsentwicklung im Steinkohlenbergbau. Vom Beginn der Industrialisierung bis zum Ende des Zweiten Weltkriegs. 1st ed. Aachen 1995 (Aachener Beiträge zur Rohstofftechnik und -wirtschaft, 4).
- Führung von Bergbauunternehmen. 1st ed. Aachen: Mainz 2000 (Aachener Beiträge zur Rohstofftechnik und -wirtschaft, 30).
- with Michael Farrenkopf (Ed.): Das Wissensrevier. 150 Jahre Westfälische Berggewerkschaftskasse/DMT-Gesellschaft für Lehre und Bildung. Bochum: German Mining Museum 2014. (2 vol.)
- Kretschmann, Jürgen; Nguyen, Thi Hoai Nga (2014): Adaptation Saves Lives! Transferring Excellence In Occupational Safety And Health Management From German To Southeast Asian Mining. 2. Aufl. Hanoi, Vietnam: Hong Duc Publishing House.
- Kretschmann, Jürgen; Melchers, Christian (Ed.) (2016): Done for Good - Challenges of Post-Mining. Anthology by the Research Institute of Post-Mining. TH Georg Agricola University. Bochum (Veröffentlichungen aus dem Deutschen Bergbau-Museum Bochum, 212).
- with Stephan Düppe (Ed.): 1816 – 2016. Die Geschichte der Technischen Hochschule Georg Agricola. Bochum: German Mining Museum 2016 (Publications from the German Mining Museum, Bochum, 209).
