= Technische Hochschule Georg Agricola =

- Type: Private
- Established: 1816; 210 years ago
- President: Jürgen Kretschmann
- Academic staff: 252
- Students: 2.475
- Location: Bochum, North Rhine-Westphalia, Germany; 51°29′15″N 7°12′48″E
- Website: www.thga.de

The Technische Hochschule Georg Agricola (THGA, formerly also known as FH Bergbau and TFH Bochum) is a state-accredited, private university of applied sciences based in Bochum, Germany. It was founded in 1816 as a Bergschule (mining school) to train mining officials and mining foremen (Steiger) and, in the 20th century, grew into an engineering college and later a university. It has borne the name of the polymath and mining pioneer Georgius Agricola since 1995.

Today, the institution offers 14 bachelor's and master's degree courses in the fields of geological resources and process engineering, mechanical engineering, materials sciences, electrical engineering and information technology as well as industrial engineering. During the 2017/2018 winter semester, there were roughly 2,500 students enrolled on courses at THGA, of which around 55% had registered for a part-time degree.

One of the main areas of focus of THGA is research into post-mining.

== History ==
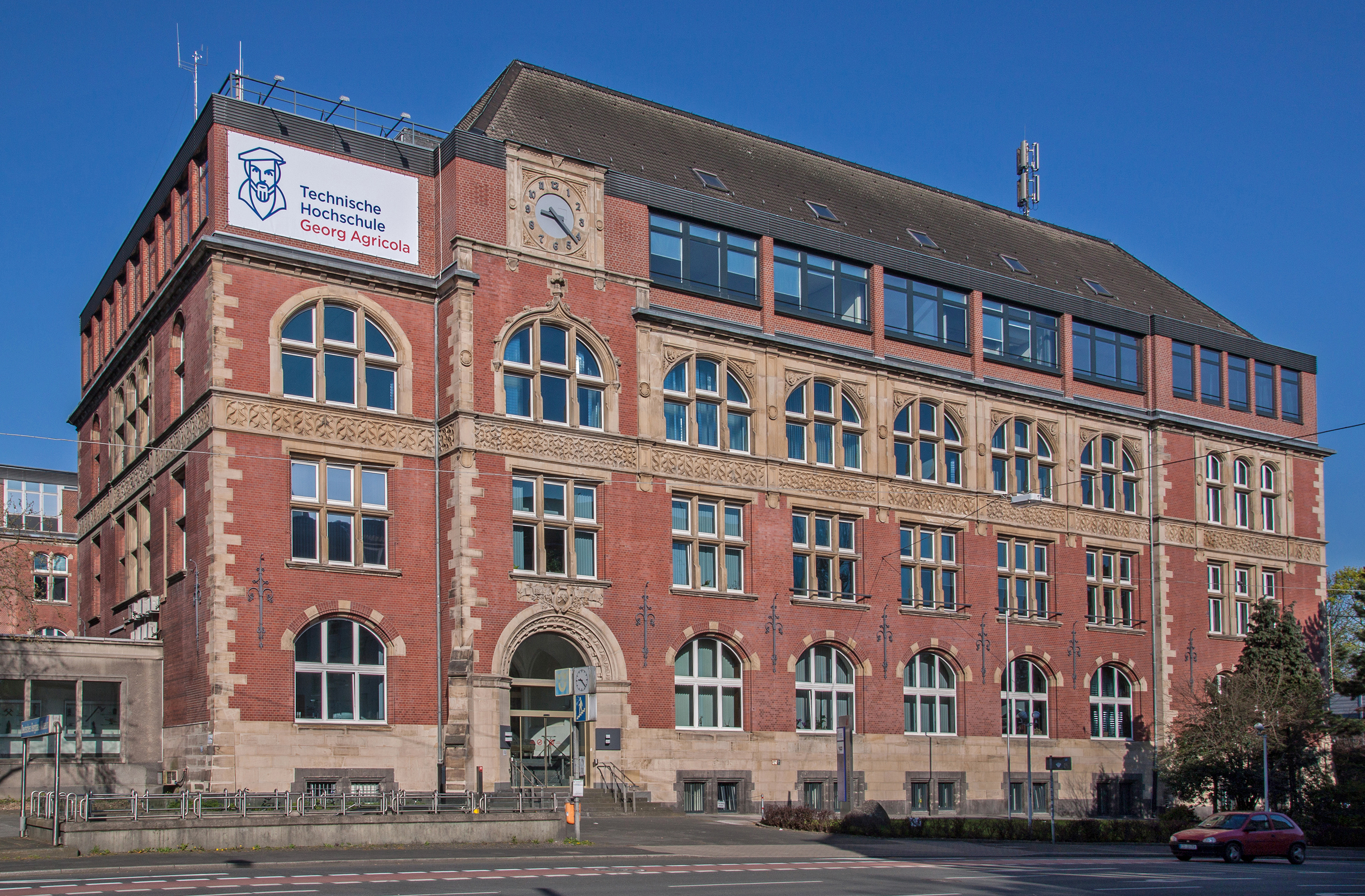
THGA main building

The origins of the present-day university date back to 1816, when the Prussian mining authority set up the “Märkische Bergschule” (mining school) in Bochum with the aim of training foreman and other mining officials for their new roles in the up-and-coming mining industry in the Ruhr Valley region.

In 1864, the newly founded Westphalian Mining Trade Fund, Westfälische Berggewerkschaftskasse (WBK), became the responsible body for the school. Under the leadership of Hugo Schultz, the Bochum mining school experienced a dramatic upsurge from 1868 onwards: the number of students doubled to more than 100 by the end of the century, such that new school premises were opened in 1899, which included the laboratories of the WBK research facilities. Alongside the training of foreman, the mining school took on other duties such as preparing mine drawings and undertaking academic surveys, resulting in the opening of Deutsches Bergbau-Museum Bochum (German Mining Museum, Bochum) in 1930 on the basis of scientific and technical collections from the college.

Following World War II, the college's profile changed as a result of the coal crisis which took hold in 1958. Whereas the need for qualified miners fell, the demand for higher qualifications increased. Consequently, the mining school initially became the Ingenieurschule für Bergwesen (Engineering School for Mining) in 1963, followed by a conversion to the Fachhochschule Bergbau (University of Mining) in 1971. In 1995, the university was renamed the Technische Fachhochschule Georg Agricola.

A new presidential constitution was passed in 2006 and, one year later, all Diplom courses were converted into the bachelor's/master's system in accordance with the Bologna Process. Plans devised by the then regional parliament of the State of North Rhine-Westphalia to merge the university with the state-run FH Bochum (Bochum University of Applied Sciences) were scrapped after student protests in 2012. With the support of the RAG-Stiftung, the Research Institute of Post-Mining was set up and new degree courses introduced.

To mark the 200th anniversary in April 2016, the institution was once again renamed Technische Hochschule Georg Agricola.

== Organisational structure ==
Since 1 January 1990, the university's governing body has been DMT-Gesellschaft für Lehre und Bildung mbh (DMT-LB), which also maintains the adjacent German Mining Museum in conjunction with the city of Bochum. DMT-LB emerged in 1990 as one of two subsidiaries of the association Deutsche Montan Technologie für Rohstoff, Energie und Umwelt e. V. (DMT e. V.), which, in turn, arose from the merger of Westfälische Berggewerkschaftskasse with a series of similar organisations, the aim being to consolidate the educational and research activities of the entire German coal mining industry.

THGA is led by a six-strong executive committee, which includes not only the President, Jürgen Kretschmann, but also a vice president responsible for the budget and administration and three vice presidents for each of the faculties. The Research Institute of Post-Mining is also represented by a vice president.

== Faculties and degree courses ==
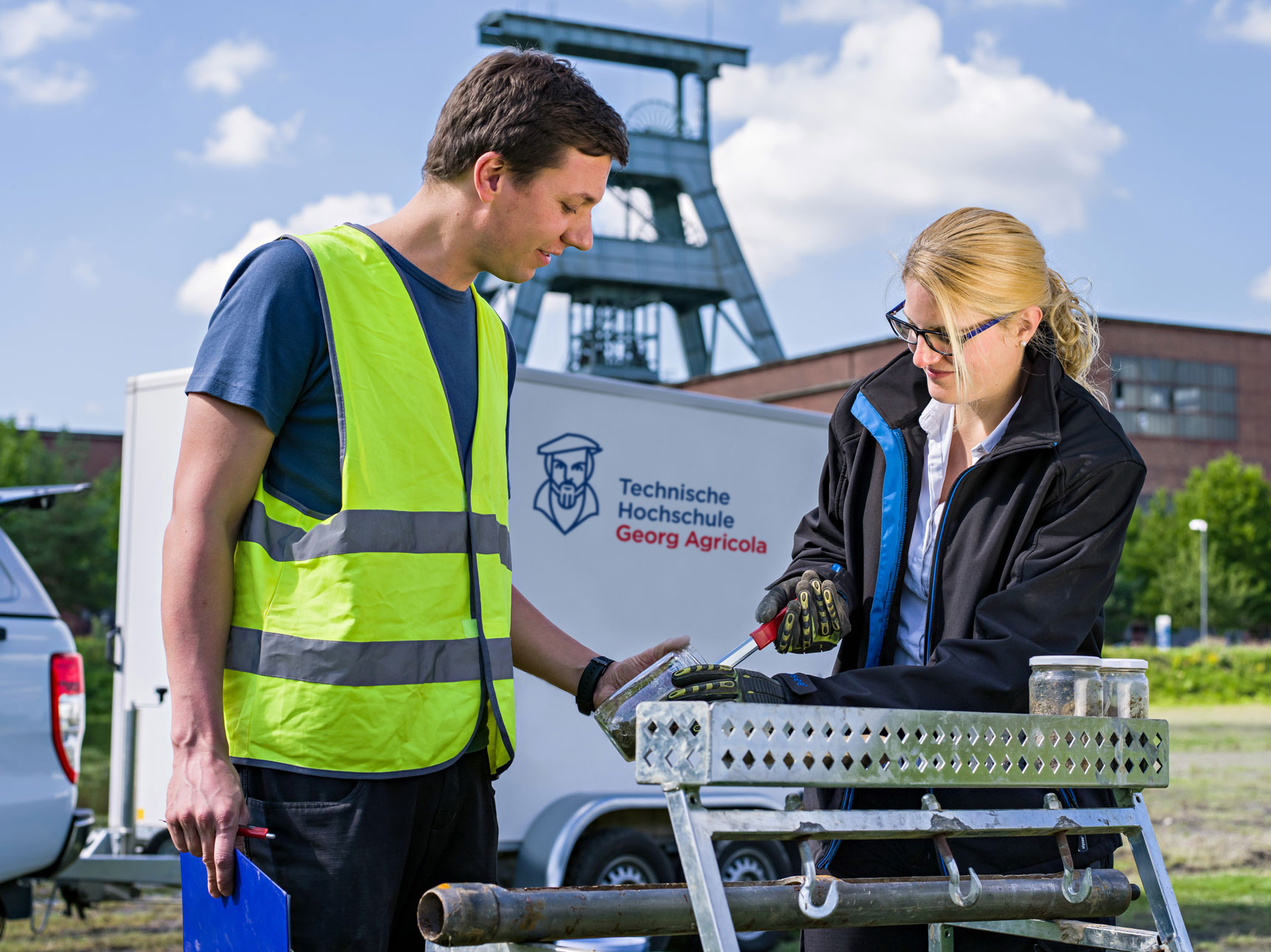
THGA Students

THGA is split into three faculties, which currently offer eight bachelor's and six master's degree courses in total. Teaching and learning are designed to be of practical relevance, with some 80 per cent of dissertations exploring topics relevant to a company. The majority of courses are also available on a part-time basis. Since 2018, it has also been possible to graduate from the master's programmes with the title “European Engineer” (Eur Ing).

Faculty 1: Geo-Resources and Process Engineering

Bachelor’s programmes

- Geotechnical Engineering and Applied Geology (B.Eng.)
- Mineral Resource Engineering (B.Eng.)
- Process Engineering (B.Eng.)
- Surveying (B.Eng.)

Master’s programmes

- Geoengineering and Post-Mining (M.Eng)
- Mineral Resource and Process Engineering (M.Sc.)

Faculty 2: Mechanical Engineering and Material Sciences

Bachelor’s programmes

- Applied Material Sciences (B.Eng.)
- Mechanical Engineering (B.Eng.)

Master’s programmes

- Mechanical Engineering

Faculty 3: Electrical Engineering, Information Technology and Industrial Engineering with Business Studies

Bachelor’s programmes

- Electrical Engineering and Information Technology (B.Eng.)
- Technical Business Management (B.Sc.)

Master’s programmes

- Occupational Safety Management (M.Sc.)
- Electrical Engineering and Information Technology (M.Eng.)
- Industrial Engineering with Business Studies (M.Sc.)

== Research Institute of Post-Mining ==
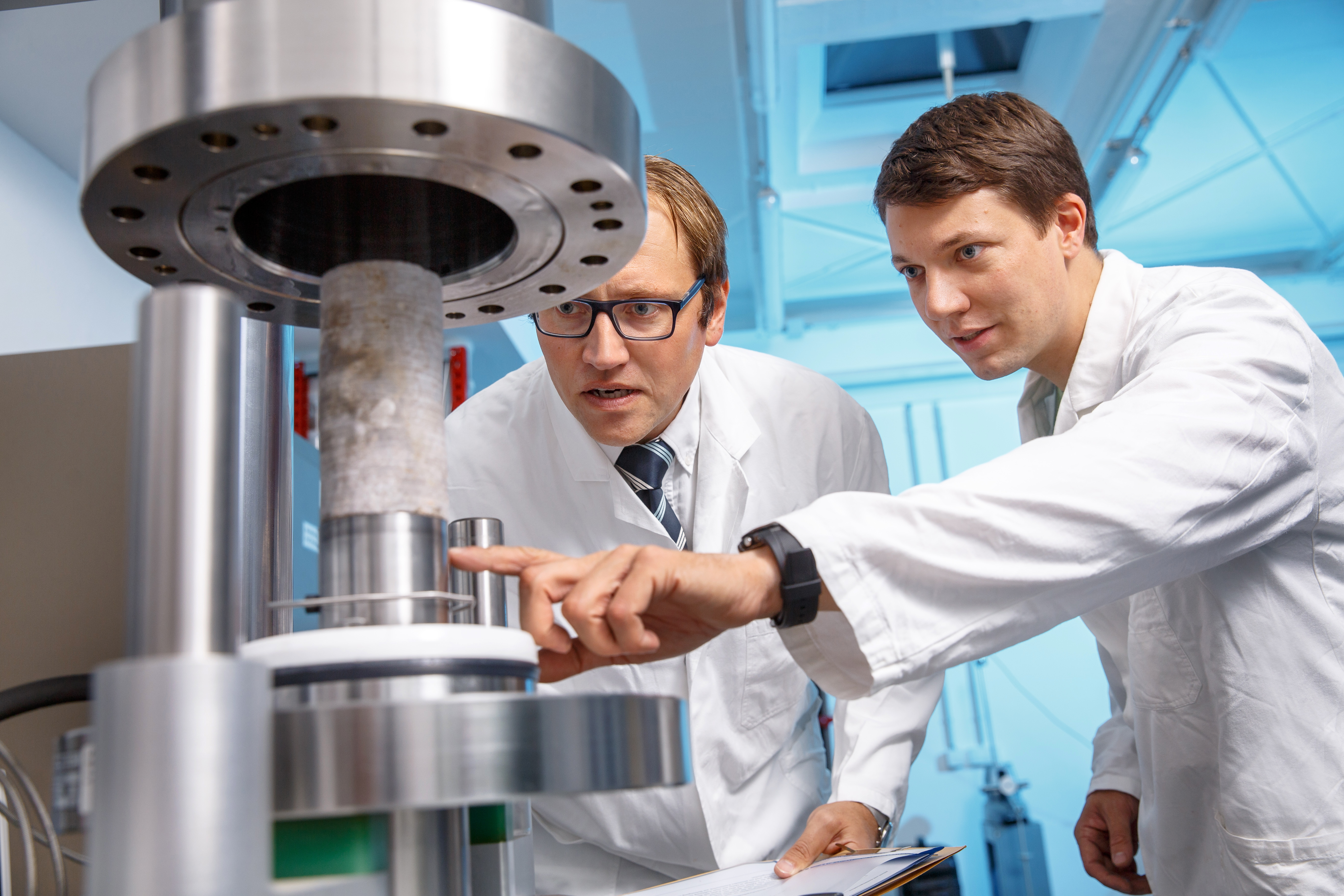
FZN laboratory

The Research Institute of Post-Mining (Forschungszentrum Nachbergbau; FZN) was set up in 2015 with financial assistance from RAG-Stiftung and state/EU grants. As the only research institute of its kind anywhere in the world, it carries out research into the so-called perpetual obligations associated with coal mining (pit water management, the renovation of disused collieries), the conversion of former mining sites for commercial/recreational use and the development potential of former mining areas. This also includes the development of cutting-edge systems to monitor the consequences of mining using special deep-water probes and remote sensing data. The interdisciplinary team comprises experts from the fields of mining, geology, geotechnology, hydrogeology, electrical engineering/information technology and mine surveying. It is intended to make the combined knowledge from the areas of mining and post-mining available in a dedicated database.

Students can enrol on the world's only Geo-Engineering and Post-Mining master's programme, which offers a combination of natural sciences and technology. The programme's curriculum covers not only rock mechanics and economic geology, but hydrology, surveying and legal issues too. The Head of the Research Institute is Professor Christian Melchers (last updated: 2019). The Institute also has a special professorship for “Geo-Monitoring in Mining and Post-Mining” endowed by the RAG-Stiftung. This post has been held by Professor Tobias Rudolph since May 2019.

== Projects and partnerships ==
THGA is engaged in numerous collaborative projects with partners outside academia. It supports, for instance, initiatives to encourage young people to become the first members of their family to go to university.

As part of its “third mission”, THGA launched a special study programme in 2016 for people from refugee backgrounds. (https://www.thga.de/die-th/zentrale-einrichtungen/international-office/fluechtlingsinitiative/) This programme combines language acquisition, specialist qualifications and integration. The programme is supported by the German Academic Exchange Service (DAAD) and the RAG-Stiftung and runs in close cooperation with regional job centres. In 2017, a Competence Empowerment Centre (CEC) was set up for the purpose of vocational training and integration. In 2017, people with a refugee background accounted for 5.2 per cent of THGA, making the institution unique within Germany.

A further component of the “third mission” is the Dual Career Network Ruhr (DCN Ruhr), of which THGA is the founder member. This network helps partners of newly appointed academics to get their careers off the ground in the region. The DCN is coordinated by the Mercator Research Center Ruhr (MERCUR).

Since 2017, THGA has been involved in the “Karrierewege FH-Professur” (“Career paths for professorships at universities of applied sciences”) throughout the region. Over a three-year grant period, participants are given the opportunity to combine real-world professional experience outside academia with teaching and research experience within a university of applied sciences. They work at both a programme-leading institution and an external company.

In the Hidden Champions^{3} project, master craftspeople, technicians and similar specialists at SMEs are trained as skilled professionals and executives in part-time degree courses running alongside their day jobs.

THGA is involved in Netzwerk UniverCity Bochum, which seeks to strengthen the affinity of the local population with the city's scientific institutions. The network comprises the nine universities in the city of Bochum, the academic support body (AKAFÖ), the Chamber of Industry and Commerce for the central Ruhr Valley (IHK Mittleres Ruhrgebiet), Deutsches Bergbau-Museum Bochum (German Mining Museum) and Bochum Marketing GmbH.

== Bibliography ==
- Jürgen Kretschmann, Stephan Düppe (Ed.): 1816–2016. Die Geschichte der Technischen Hochschule Georg Agricola. In-house publisher of Deutsches Bergbau-Museum Bochum. ISBN 978-3-937203-78-2
- Das Wissensrevier. 150 Jahre Bergbauforschung und Ausbildung bei der Westfälischen Berggewerkschaftskasse/DMT-Gesellschaft für Lehre und Bildung. Deutsches Bergbau-Museum Bochum, Bochum 2014.
  - Vol. 1: Stefan Moitra: Die Geschichte einer Institution. ISBN 978-3-937203-69-0 (= publications from Deutsches Bergbau-Museum Bochum No. 197)
  - Vol. 2: Michael Farrenkopf, Michael Ganzelewski: Katalog zur Sonderausstellung. Deutsches Bergbau-Museum Bochum vom 19. Juni 2014 bis 22. Februar 2015. ISBN 978-3-937203-72-0 (= publications from Deutsches Bergbau-Museum Bochum No. 198)
