= DMT-Gesellschaft für Lehre und Bildung =

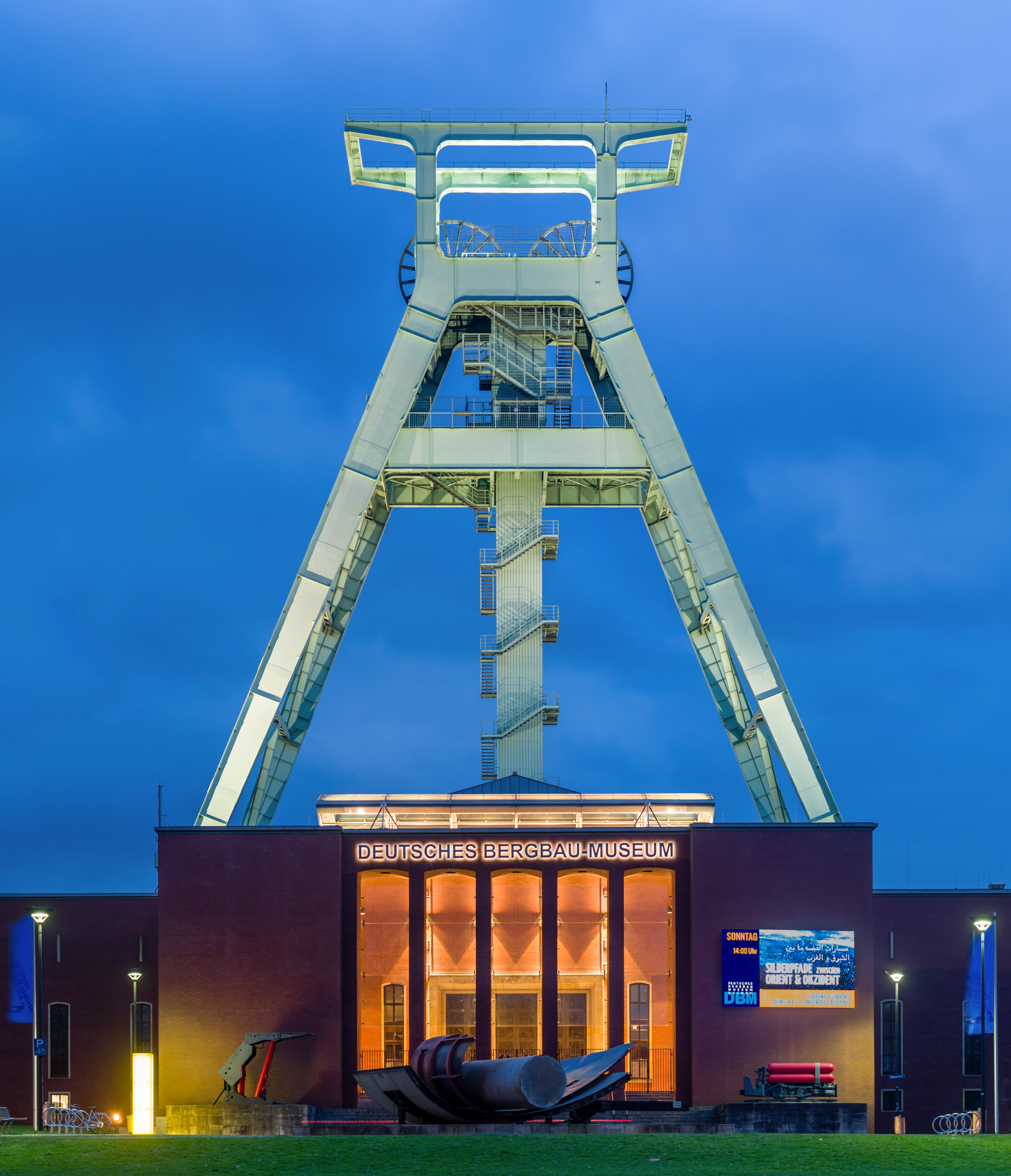
German mining museum

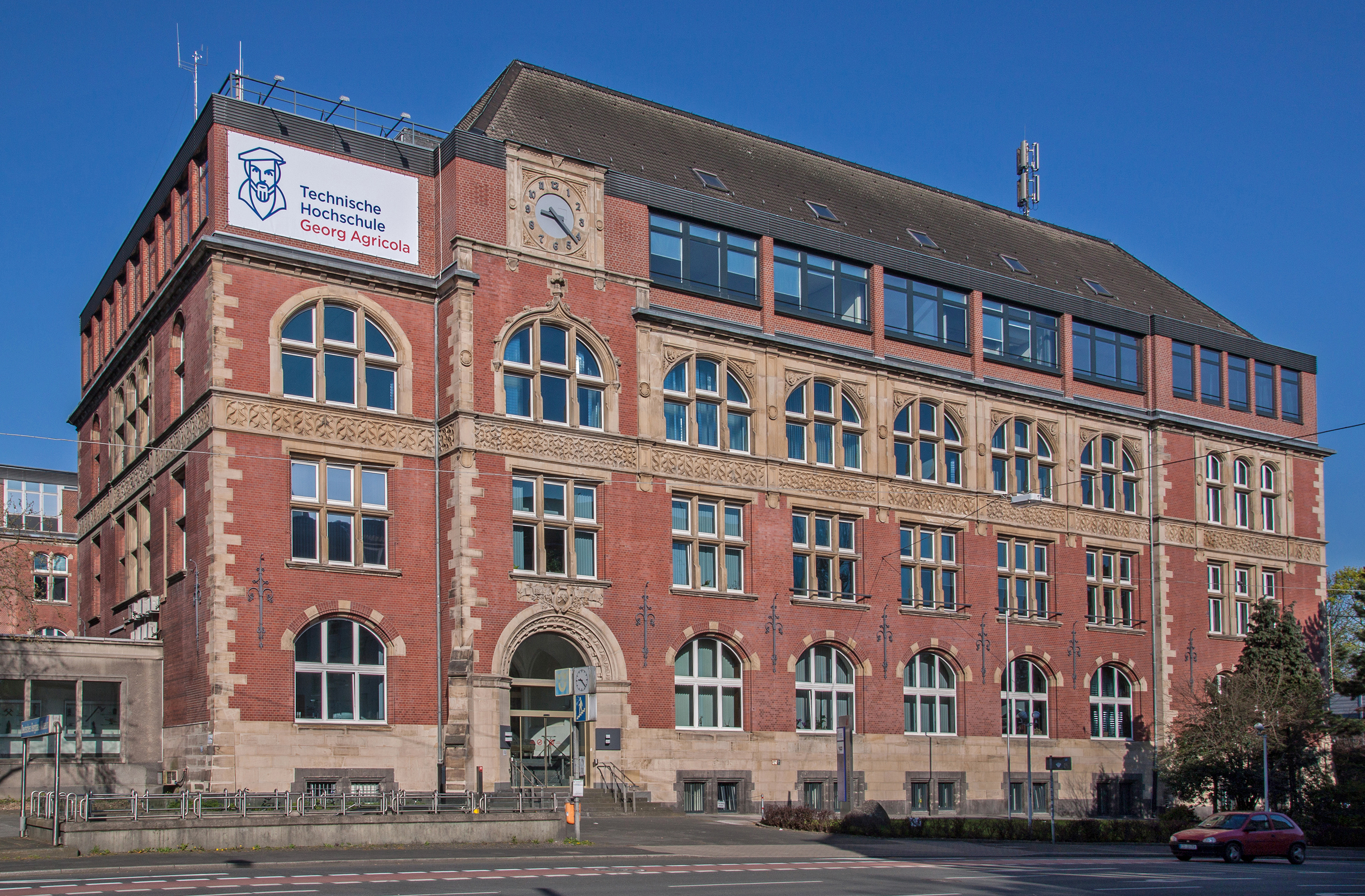
Main building of DMT-LB and THGA Bochum

DMT-Gesellschaft für Lehre und Bildung mbH (DMT-LB), based in Bochum, is a collective association of the German coal mining industry and acts as the funding organisation of Deutsches Bergbau-Museum Bochum (German Mining Museum) and Technische Hochschule Georg Agricola. It was established as the Westfälische Berggewerkschaftskasse (WBK) in 1864 and merged with the Steinkohlen-Bergbau-Verein (Stbv) and Bergbau Forschung GmbH under the auspices of DeutscheMontanTechnologie e.V. (DMT) in 1990.

== History ==
The Westfälische Berggewerkschaftskasse (WBK) was founded in 1864 as part of a reform of Prussian mining legislation. Starting in the 18th century, mining office and mining relief funds started springing up in Prussian territories (including the County of Mark and Essen and Werden Abbeys, which had been part of Prussia since 1803). These were funded with the mandatory contributions of the private mining companies (cooperatives) and served to finance the state mining offices as well as certain mining-related communal activities such as road construction, geological measurements and the training of mining officers and foremen. The new organisation WBK brought together several of these forerunner funds. It took over responsibility for funding the Bergschule Bochum (Bochum mining college, now THGA), which was set up in 1816. The organisation’s remit was later expanded to include mining colleges in Bergkamen, Duisburg and Recklinghausen. WBK was also active in the field of applied science, including the Erdmagnetische Warte Bochum (Bochum Geometric Observatory), which was built in 1854 and later moved to Vossnacken/Velbert. It also helped to fund construction of the Bergmannsheil University Hospitals in Bochum and the expansion of the network of ship canals that link the Ruhr Valley to areas such as the North sea. The decades that followed also witnessed numerous laboratories, testing facilities for firedamp experiments in Dortmund and inspection sites for hoisting cables and mining lamps. In the process, WBK increasingly handled public appraisal and inspection duties in the area of mine safety and occupational health and safety. The scientific collections of WBK paved the way for Deutsches Bergbau-Museum Bochum in 1930.

During the period of rapid reconstruction following the World War II, the German coal mining industry experienced a brief revival before the coal crisis hit, resulting in huge falls in sales and mass pit closures. In 1968, Ruhrkohle AG was set up as a company to rescue the struggling mining firms. At roughly the same time, people were starting to consider consolidation of the many joint technical and scientific institutions maintained by the coal mining industry. Following lengthy negotiations, the association Deutsche Montan Technologie für Rohstoff, Energie, Umwelt e.V. (DMT) was established as of 1 January 1990, which, alongside WBK, also incorporated Steinkohlen-BergbauVerein (Stbv), Bergbau-Forschung GmbH in Essen and Versuchsgrubengesellschaft mbH on the site of the former Tremonia colliery in Dortmund. (214 ff.) In turn, two further companies were set up under the auspices of this association, which, at the time, counted all German mining companies as members:

- DMT-Gesellschaft für Forschung und Prüfung mbH (DMT-FP), which, following multiple restructuring measures, was incorporated within the TÜV Nord Group in 2007 and has been operating as DMT GmbH & Co. KG ever since.
- DMT-Gesellschaft für Lehre und Bildung mbH (DMT-LB). Alongside the DBM and THGA, this company also operated four vocational colleges until late 2000. Just like the firm’s activities in the area of retraining and qualification, these colleges were transferred to RAG companies (RAG-Bildung Berufskolleg GmbH), which are also now part of the TÜV Nord Group, as a result of restructuring or changes of ownership.

== Organisational structure of the DMT-LB today ==
The sole shareholder of DMT-LB is Deutsche Montan Technologie e. V. (DMT), which is funded by the RAG-Stiftung as well as RAG AG and its subsidiaries. DMT-LB employs some 300 people, 40 of whom are teaching staff at THGA. In 2017, the company’s turnover amounted to €36.1 million, with some 53% attributable to institutional grants.

== Bibliography ==
- Das Wissensrevier. 150 Jahre Bergbauforschung und Ausbildung bei der Westfälischen Berggewerkschaftskasse/DMT-Gesellschaft für Lehre und Bildung. Deutsches Bergbau-Museum Bochum, Bochum 2014
  - Vol. 1: Stefan Moitra: Die Geschichte einer Institution. ISBN 978-3-937203-69-0 (= publications from Deutsches Bergbau-Museum Bochum No. 197)
  - Vol. 2: Michael Farrenkopf, Michael Ganzelewski: Katalog zur Sonderausstellung. Deutsches Bergbau-Museum Bochum vom 19. Juni 2014 bis 22. Februar 2015. ISBN 978-3-937203-72-0 (= publications from Deutsches Bergbau-Museum Bochum No. 198)
- 1816–2016 Die Geschichte der Technischen Hochschule Georg Agricola. In-house publisher of Deutsches Bergbau-Museum Bochum. ISBN 978-3-937203-78-2
