= Ourrouar =

Archaeological sites in Lebanon

- Ourrouar I, Ourrouar II, Ourrouar III, Ourrouar IV
- Periods: Heavy Neolithic, Neolithic
- Cultures: Qaraoun culture
- Location: 8.5 kilometres (5.3 mi) south southeast of Beirut, Lebanon

Site notes
- Archaeologists: Lorraine Copeland, Henri Fleisch
- Condition: built up
- Public access: Yes

Ourrouar is a series of archaeological sites approximately 8.5 kilometres (5.3 mi) south southeast of Beirut, Lebanon. It is near Hadeth south on the north side of the Nahr Ghedir.

== Ourrouar I ==
Ourrouar I is 300 metres (980 ft) east of the bridge over Nahr Ghedir on a platform of sandy, brown Neogene conglomerates on sloping river terraces to the south of the road to Wadi Chahrour. The deposits appear to have been moved from elsewhere, so it is suggested to be a false site by Lorraine Copeland, who found it in 1964 and collected tools made out of shiny, yellow flint that were examined by Henri Fleisch and M. Gigout. Middle Paleolithic forms were found there including Levallois tortoise cores, point-cores, scrapers and flakes that are similar in form to the assemblage found at Mazraat Beit Chaar. Material is held by the Museum of Lebanese Prehistory.

== Ourrouar II ==
Ourrouar II is 500 metres (1,600 ft) east of the bridge over Nahr Ghedir on slopes of cemented conglomerates behind two empty houses. The site was discovered and Heavy Neolithic material recovered along with traces of other morphologies by Peter Wescombe in 1965. Finds included a rough, celt-shaped axe, numerous short, heavy picks, a chopper, burins, flakes and blades in poor quality grey flint, several of which were rather large in size. Another smaller group of tools was found on the lower and western slopes made of flint that had patinated to white that included steep-scrapers and sickle blade elements. The lower slopes of the site were destroyed during new road construction. Material is held by the Museum of Lebanese Prehistory. Andrew Moore suggested that the station was a factory site for Heavy Neolithic tools of the Qaraoun culture.

== Ourrouar III ==
Ourrouar III or Wadi Chahrour and Salikha a site detected in three locations along the riverbed of the Wadi Chahrour (or Wadi Ghedir) around 400 metres (1,300 ft) upstream, east of the bridge of the Beirut to Sidon road. Collections were made from the first two locations by Auguste Bergy with studies by Henri Fleisch and the third location noted by Peter Wescombe in 1965. Material from location one was mixed with some showing Middle Paleolithic forms including picks, scrapers, flakes and cores. Location two is a section in the 50 metres (160 ft) high banks of the stream on a bank of pebbles overlaying a layer of red sand. Henri Fleisch collected Middle Paleolithic appearance material from this red layer, which is suggested to represent a dry period where dunes covered the area. Location three was located west of the riverbed in the foundations of a building cut into the bank amongst terraces planted with olives. A red sand layer of 2 metres (6.6 ft) contained scrapers and cores overlies a deep layer of pebbles. This was covered by black soil containing a few flakes. Two wet periods intervened by a drier one were indicated and the material stored in the Museum of Lebanese Prehistory marked "Salikha".

== Ourrouar IV ==
Ourrouar IV is a site where some Neolithic tools were found 600 metres (2,000 ft) to the west of Ourrouar II on a hill overlooking the road between Beirut and Sidon just north of the bridge. Evidence of a Roman occupation was also discovered on the site.

Industrial waste was continuously dumped into the bed of the stream covering the sites with building materials and destroying the undisturbed areas of the banks.
