= Ard Saouda =

Archaeological site in Lebanon Lebanon

- Ard es Saoude, Terres Noires
- Periods: Heavy Neolithic, Neolithic, Acheulean
- Cultures: Qaraoun culture
- Location: Wadi et Taim, between Rashaya and Marjayoun, Lebanon

Site notes
- Excavation dates: 1957
- Archaeologists: M. Billeaux, Henri Fleisch, Maurice Tallon, Jacques Cauvin, Frank Skeels, L. Skeels, M. Le Cavalier, Lorraine Copeland.
- Public access: Unknown

Ard Saouda or Ard es Saoude (Terres Noires) is a Heavy Neolithic archaeological site of the Qaraoun culture that is located in the Wadi al-Taym, between Rashaya and Marjayoun in Lebanon. It is south of the branch road to Qaraoun and Kaukaba at cote 990, on the surface of fields covered in large blocks of basalt, made from an ancient lava.

The Neolithic site was located by M. Billeaux in 1957 left of the road, just before the junction. A further Acheulean site was found downhill to the southwest by Henri Fleisch. The site was extended by further discoveries by M. Le Cavalier and F. and L. Skeels at Jeb Farah. The area is notable for draining mountain waters into the most northerly feeders of the Jordan River.

The Acheulean material was published by Fleisch in 1966 with the Neolithic remains studied by Jacques Cauvin. Over three hundred Acheulean bifaces were collected along with various waste, used cores and rough-outs. It was mostly in brown, shiny flint, some with a grey film. The pieces were heavily patinated, sometimes with a number of different patinas. This allowed Fleisch to divide the tools into four groups, Early Paleolithic, Middle Paleolithic, Middle/Late Paleolithic, and Upper Paleolithic with Levallois technique being used on cores in later periods. The Heavy Neolithic and Neolithic material was mostly in a creamy chert and consisted of adzes, chisels, oval axes with retouch all over, racloirs, cores and discs. Lorraine Copeland made a collection of similar materials in 1966 and noted the problems assigning material to specific periods. It seemed apparent that the Neolithic flint knappers had re-used older Acheulean tools and that the site had been a factory throughout numerous periods in a long and ancient history.
