= Orange slice =

Early flint sickle blade element

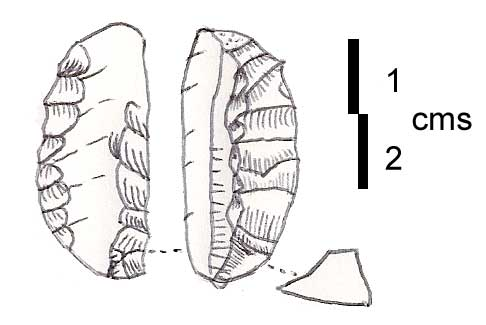
Orange slice - An early sickle blade element with inverse, discontinuous retouch on each side, not denticulated. Found at Habarjer III. Grey or black flint, patinates to white.

An orange slice is an early sickle blade element made out of flint. The flints get their name from their shape, which resembles a segment of an orange. The morphology was first recognized by J. Hamal-Nandrin and J. Servais in 1928, who called them "Quartier d'orange" in French. This sickle industry has no evidence of developed denticulation. Orange slices were used for harvesting plants at the start of the Neolithic Revolution and were particularly prevalent in Lebanon where they were found alongside Heavy Neolithic axes and larger flint tools of the Qaraoun culture in and around Qaraoun in the south of the country. Sites where orange slices have been found include Mejdel Anjar I, Dakwe I and II, Habarjer III, Qaraoun I and II, Kefraya, and Beıdar Chamout. Orange slices were only found in large quantities around Qaraoun, where it is suggested they were part of a specialist Neolithic industry of the area.
