= Baidar ech Chamout =

Baidar ech Chamout Baïdar ech Chamoût
- Village
- Interactive map of Baidar ech Chamout
- Country: Lebanon
- Governorate: Beqaa Governorate
- District: Western Beqaa District

Baidar ech Chamout
- Beidar Chamout
- Location within Lebanon
- 33.530833°N 35.669444°E
- Periods: Heavy Neolithic, Neolithic, Paleolithic
- Cultures: Qaraoun culture
- Location: 3 kilometres (1.9 mi) northeast of Machgara, Lebanon
- Region: Beqaa Governorate

Site notes
- Excavation dates: 1952
- Archaeologists: Henri Fleisch, Jacques Cauvin
- Condition: Ruins
- Public access: Yes

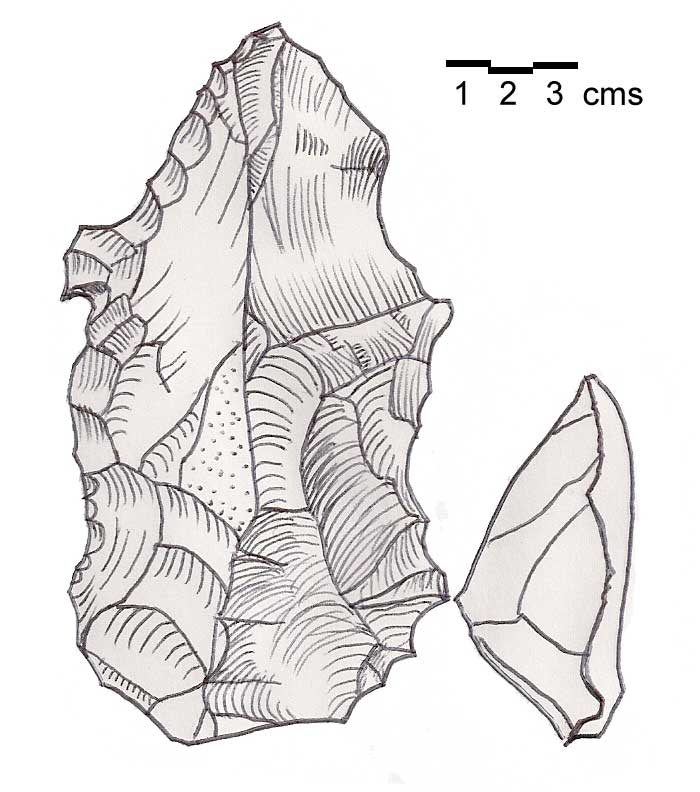
Heavy Neolithic flint tools of the Qaraoun culture found at Mtaileb I - Massive nosed scraper on a flake with irregular jagged edges, notches and "noses".

Baidar ech Chamout, Baïdar ech Chamoût or Beidar Chamout is a small village located 3 kilometres (1.9 mi) northeast of Machgara in the Western Beqaa District of Beqaa Governorate in Lebanon.

A Heavy Neolithic archaeological site of the Qaraoun culture is located in the area on the right bank of the Litani river, where the North Cheeta exits from a ravine opposite the Dahr er Rimoul foothills. It was found by Henri Fleisch in 1952 in an area of approximately 100 metres (110 yd) by 600 metres (660 yd) in the fields around a fountain of the Machgara spring on a track approximately 500 metres (550 yd) southwest of cote 853. It was described in detail in Fleisch's report of 1954 and again in 1960. Jacques Cauvin also examined and published details of the materials found, then stored with the Saint Joseph University (now the Museum of Lebanese Prehistory). The Heavy Neolithic pieces were considered identical to those found at Qaraoun II.

A later Neolithic assemblage was found thought to be similar to the Neolithic récent of Byblos consisting of adzes, rabots, chisels and cores. Another assemblage without any triangular points was tentatively suggested to date to the Middle Paleolithic, although may actually be Neolithic. The area was under cultivation in 1966.
