= Amlaq Qatih =

Archaeological site in Lebanon

Amalq Qatih
- Amlaq el Qatih
- Periods: Heavy Neolithic
- Cultures: Qaraoun culture
- Location: 2.5 kilometres (1.6 mi) northwest of Baaloul, 5 kilometres (3.1 mi) north of Qaraoun, Lebanon

Site notes
- Excavation dates: 1955
- Archaeologists: Henri Fleisch, Maurice Tallon
- Public access: Unknown

Amlaq Qatih or Amlaq el Qatih is a Heavy Neolithic archaeological site of the Qaraoun culture that is located 2.5 kilometres (1.6 mi) northwest of Baaloul, 5 kilometres (3.1 mi) north of Qaraoun, Lebanon.

The site was discovered and collections made by Henri Fleisch and Maurice Tallon in 1955. Materials recovered were found to be of a cream-coloured, cherty type of flint and were suggested to date from Acheulian, Heavy Neolithic and normal Neolithic periods and included a few Levallois cores.
