= Jebel Aabeby =

Archaeological site in Lebanon

- جبل عبيبي (Arabic)
- Location within Lebanon
- 33.5525°N 35.396389°E
- Type: terraces
- Periods: Heavy Neolithic, Neolithic
- Cultures: Qaraoun culture
- Location: 2 kilometres (1.2 mi) southeast of Sidon, Lebanon

Site notes
- Excavation dates: 1965
- Archaeologists: Henri Fleisch, V. Hankey and Lorraine Copeland
- Condition: under cultivation
- Public access: Yes

Jebel Aabeby (Arabic: جبل عبيبي) is an archaeological site approximately 2 kilometres (1.2 mi) southeast of Sidon, to the west of the road north to Qraye in Lebanon. The site is on a hill where a number of Cedar trees surround the Mar Elias monastery on the western side of the summit. A Heavy Neolithic assemblage of flint tools made by the Qaraoun culture was collected from some Olive terraces bordering on the road and from an area above them that was disturbed in the construction of a trackway. The flint was of a brown, Nummulitic, Eocene type, some having been patinated to white while others were found fresh. Several broad blades were found along with heavy scrapers on flakes, massive cores, rabots, racloirs and a few smaller scrapers. The material now stored in the Museum of Lebanese Prehistory was studied by Henri Fleisch, who concluded that the site was likely used as a prehistoric factory.
