= Bustan Birke =

Archaeological site in Lebanon

- Boustan el Birke
- Periods: Heavy Neolithic
- Cultures: Qaraoun culture
- Location: 2.5 kilometres (1.6 mi) southeast of Kefraya, Lebanon

Site notes
- Excavation dates: 1966
- Archaeologists: Lorraine Copeland and Frank Skeels

Bustan Birke or Boustan el Birke is a Heavy Neolithic archaeological site of the Qaraoun culture that is located 2.5 kilometres (1.6 mi) southeast of Kefraya, Lebanon.

The site was found in a vineyard by Lorraine Copeland and Frank Skeels in 1966. Heavy Neolithic materials recovered resembled those from Kefraya with an increased proportion of lighter tools. Large flakes, picks, large scrapers and choppers made on discoid cores were found, most frequently in chert-like flint or silicious grey limestone. Other forms found included a grattoir de côté and a nose-scraper typical of the Upper Paleolithic.

Another tell was found to the northwest of the site, opposing the road to the village but had been destroyed by the building of a villa so that only Roman material could be found among the debris.
