= Wadi Koura =

Wadi in Lebanon

- وادي الكورة (Arabic)
- Wadi Koura
- Location within Lebanon
- 33.114667°N 35.4°E
- Periods: Heavy Neolithic, Acheulian
- Cultures: Qaraoun culture
- Location: west of Ain Ebel, Lebanon
- Region: Nabatieh Governorate

Site notes
- Archaeologists: Henri Fleisch
- Public access: Yes

Heavy Neolithic axe of the Qaraoun culture - Thick and heavy biface, retouched all over with jagged and irregular edges.

Wadi Koura is a wadi located west of Ain Ebel in the Bint Jbeil District of Nabatieh Governorate in Lebanon.

A Heavy Neolithic archaeological site of the Qaraoun culture was located in the area where an outlet of the Wadi Yaroun flows from north to south in the direction of Debel. Materials were found on the site by Henri Fleisch and were stored with the Saint Joseph University (now the Museum of Lebanese Prehistory). Along with an assemblage of well rolled Heavy Neolithic tools, a few Acheulian pieces were found, both on the bed and around the banks of the wadi.
