= Duris, Lebanon =

Village in Baalbek-Hermel, Lebanon

Duris
- Doris; Douris
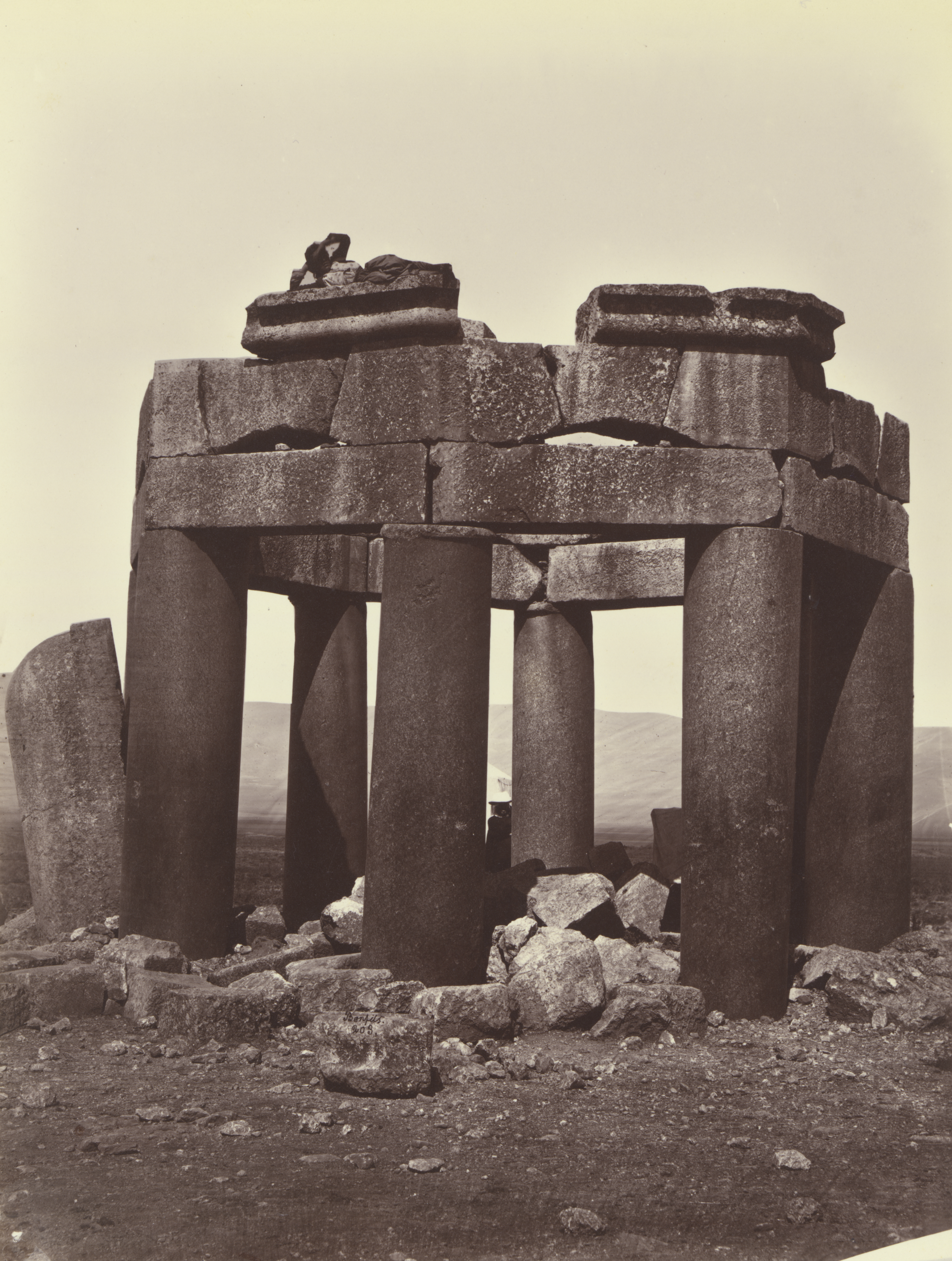
- The Qubbat Duris in 1871

- Location within Lebanon
- 33.983333°N 36.183333°E
- Periods: Heavy Neolithic, Shepherd Neolithic, Roman
- Cultures: Qaraoun culture
- Location: 3 kilometres (1.9 mi) southwest of Baalbek, Lebanon

Site notes
- Excavation dates: 1957, 1966, 1997
- Archaeologists: M. Billaux, Henri Fleisch, Maurice Tallon, Lorraine Copeland
- Public access: Unknown

Duris (Arabic: دورس, romanized: Dūris), also Dûris, formally Doris and also known by its French spelling Douris, is a village located approximately 3 km (2 mi). southwest of Baalbek in the Bekaa Valley, Lebanon. It is the site of a 13th-century Muslim shrine and a necropolis from the late Roman Imperial period that is currently undergoing archaeological investigation.

Religion in Duris (2022)
1. Shia Islam (47.0%)
2. Sunni Islam (21.0%)
3. Maronite (26.6%)
4. Greek Catholic (3.20%)
5. Orthodox (1.10%)
6. Other Christians (1.10%)

== History ==
An archaeological site which is not on the tell near the village exists 1 km (1 mi) southwest of Duris at the north of a vineyard that can be reached via a track from the road to Baalbek. This site was found to contain both Shepherd Neolithic and Heavy Neolithic material together, being unusual in this respect. It was found by M. Billaux in 1957 who showed it to two archaeologists who were also members of the Society of Jesus, Henri Fleisch and Maurice Tallon. The Shepherd Neolithic material was unpatinated and appeared similar to that of Maakne. The larger pieces were patinated to white, appearing to represent different periods. Three Levallois flakes were found in 1966 by Lorraine Copeland.

=== Middle Bronze ===
In the Middle Bronze I (c. 2000-1800 BC), there was a settlement at Tell Douris. While most of the pottery was locally made, there where imports from inland Syria (Homs and Ebla) as well from the south.

=== Medieval Period ===
The Qubbat Duris was built in AD 1243 (ah 641) during the Ayyubid era. Its sarcophagus was raised or left standing to serve as a mihrab, helping to direct prayer towards Mecca. Its columns were probably removed from the ruins of nearby Baalbek and are assembled haphazardly, one being upside-down.

In 1838, Eli Smith noted Duris as a Sunni Muslim and Maronite village in the Baalbek District.

== Gallery ==
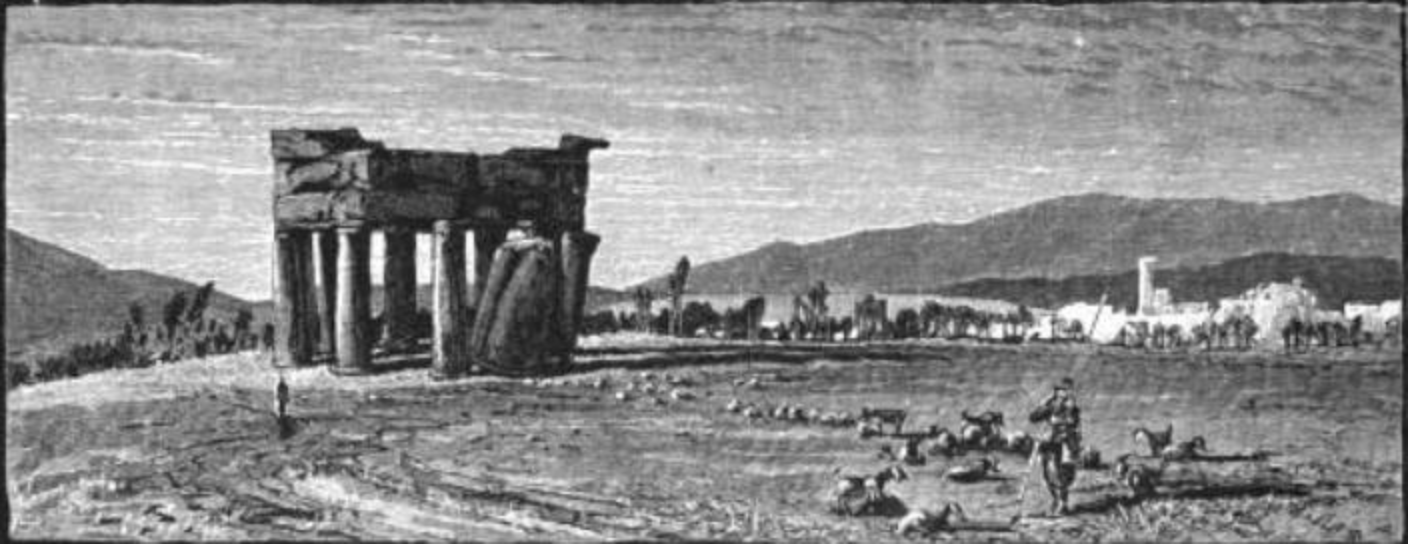
An engraving of the qubbat with Duris in the background (c. 1878)

== See also ==
- Baalbek
- Temples of the Beqaa Valley

== Bibliography ==
- De Saulcy, Louis Félicien J. Caignart (1853), Narrative of a Journey round the Dead Sea and in the Bible Lands in 1850 and 1851, vol. II, London: Bradbury & Evans for Richard Bentley.
- Jamil, Rouhi (1948), Beirut and the Republic of Lebanon, The Green Guides, Librairie Universelle.
- Jessup, Samuel (1881), "The Wady Barada", Picturesque Palestine, Sinai, and Egypt, Division II, New York: D. Appleton & Co, pp. 444–452.
- Robinson, E.; Smith, E. (1841). Biblical Researches in Palestine, Mount Sinai and Arabia Petraea: A Journal of Travels in the year 1838. Vol. 3. Boston: Crocker & Brewster.
- Robinson, E. (1856), Later Biblical Researches in Palestine, and in the Adjacent Regions. A Journal of Travels in the Year 1852 by E. Robinson, E. Smith, and Others, Boston: Crocker & Brewster
