= Joub Jannine =

Village in Lebanon

- Joub Jannine, Lebanon
- Jeb Jannine
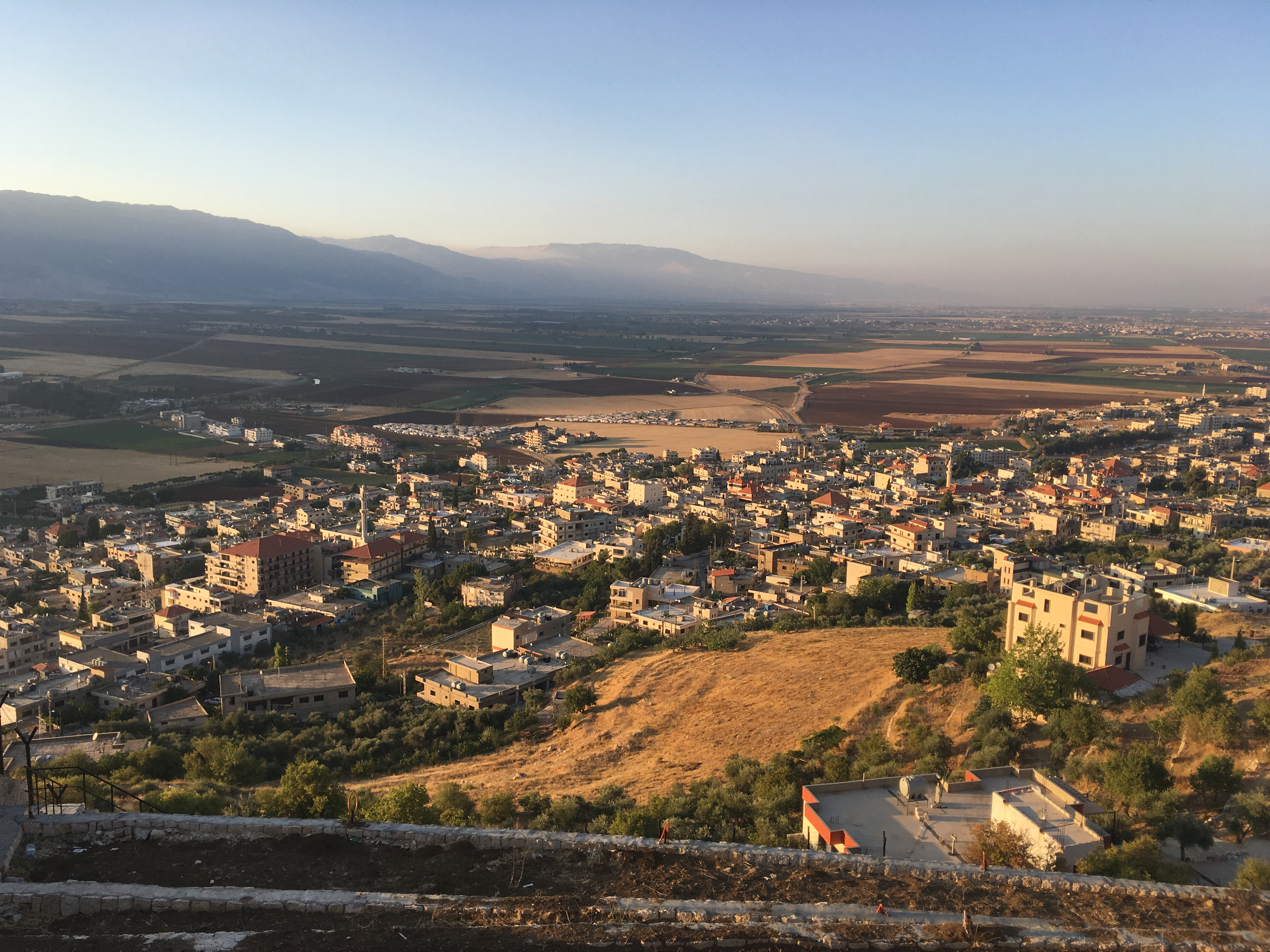
- Joub Jannine in 2016

- Location within Lebanon
- 33.63°N 35.78°E
- Periods: Trihedral Neolithic, Heavy Neolithic, Neolithic
- Location: Beqaa Valley, Lebanon
- Part of: Beqaa District

Site notes
- Archaeologists: Henri Fleisch
- Condition: ruins
- Public access: Yes

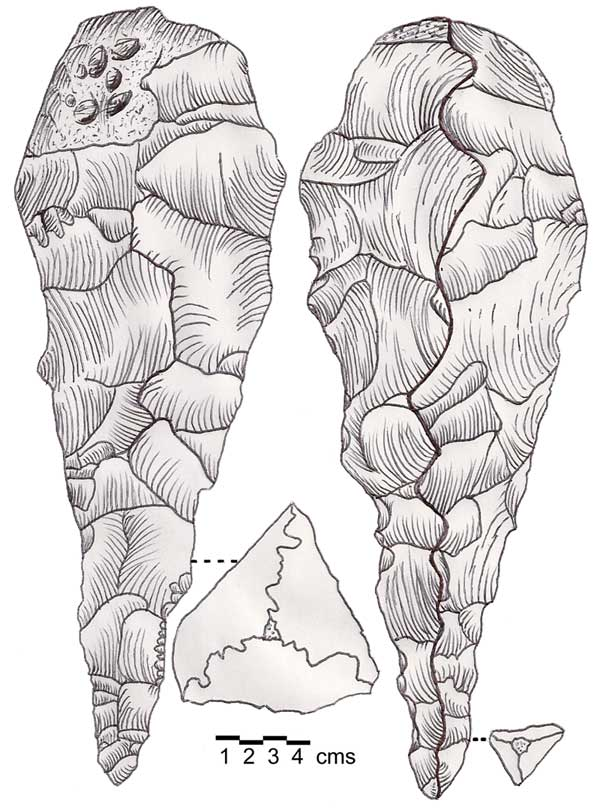
Trihedral Neolithic axe or pick from Joub Jannine II, Lebanon. Cream flint patinated to brown. In the collection of the Museum of Lebanese Prehistory at the Saint Joseph University, Beirut, Lebanon.

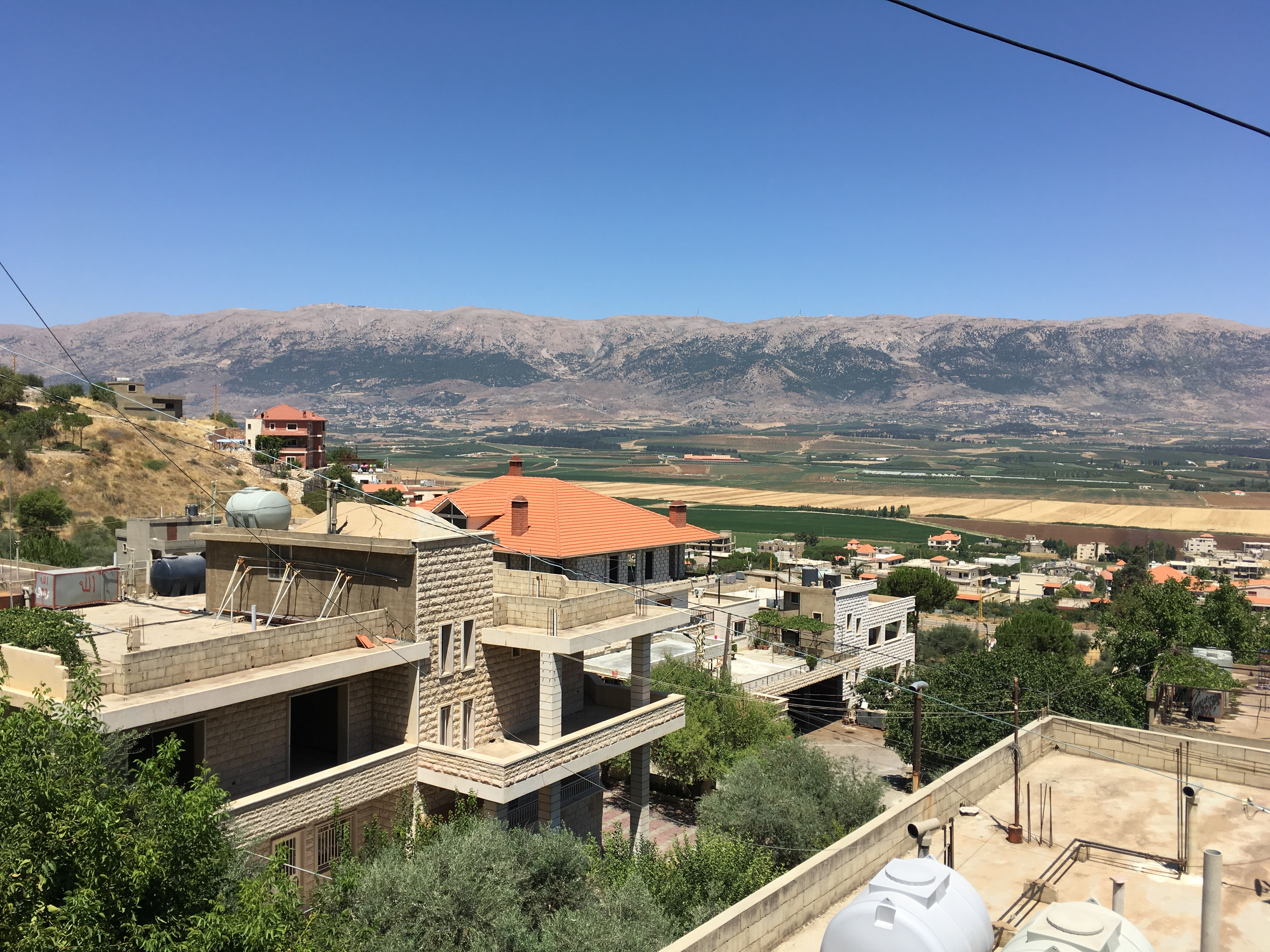
A view of the Beqaa Valley from residential Joub Jannine (taken July 2016)

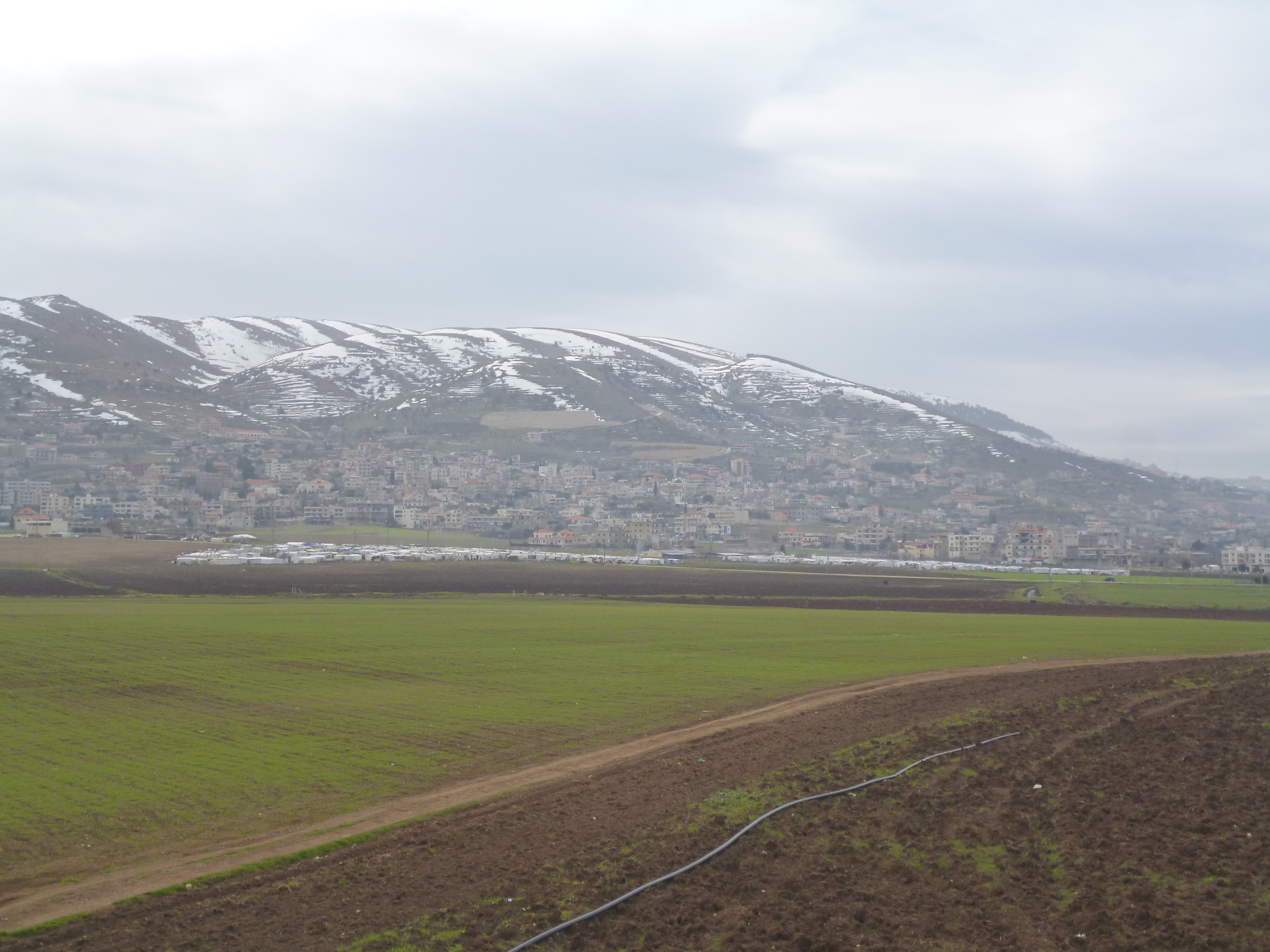
Joub Jannine. January 2015. .

Joub Jannine (Arabic: جب جنين / ALA-LC: Jub Jannīn) is a city located in the Beqaa Valley in Lebanon.

Joub Jannine serves as the capital of West Beqaa and it is the center of the Western Beqaa District, hosting the Serail, which is a main governmental building serving the entire area. Joub Jannine is the largest and most populated town in its district with a population of 14,728. All of the county's major banks can be found in Joub Jannine as well as a trades college, Amusement Park, indoor/outdoor soccer arena, basketball court and the weekly Souk which takes place every Saturday and is a local produce market.

Joub Jannine is surrounded by a number of villages. To the south there is the village of Lala, Ghazze to the north, Kamid al lawz to the east, and Kefraya, known for its wine grape vineyards, to the west.

== History ==
In 1838, Eli Smith noted Jubb Jenin as a Sunni Muslim village in the Beqaa Valley.

== Archaeological sites ==
Joub Jannine I is a small surface site brought to the surface through erosional activity of a stream. It is 8 km northeast of Qaraoun in a range of foothills, 1 km north of a small village called Jebel Gharbi, between two tracks, west of cote 878 by about 200 m. The site was found by Dubertret with a collection made by Henri Fleisch and Maurice Tallon that is now in the Museum of Lebanese Prehistory at the Saint Joseph University. Flint tools found on the site included bifaces and rough pieces that were suggested to date to the Acheulean.

Joub Jannine II was first discovered by M. Billaux in 1957. It was described by Henri Fleisch as Neolithic in 1960. It is located on the right bank of the Litani River northwest of the village, 100 m from the river and 100 m east of cote 861. An abundant amount of flint was collected including nine hundred and forty four tools and one hundred and fifty two cores. This was first reported to be a Paleolithic industry by Lorraine Copeland and Peter Wescombe. A highly specialized archaeological industry of striking spheroid and trihedral flint tools was found at the site and published by Fleisch in 1960, termed by Copeland and Wescombe as the Trihedral Neolithic. Little has been said about this industry or the ancient people that would have used these huge rock mauls (i.e. hammers) in this area, at the dawn of agriculture, or what they would have been using them for.

The material from Joub Jannine II was described by Lorraine Copeland as

Unique in Lebanon, except for isolated pieces at other sites, and consists of core-tools evidently made for a special purpose. (see Trihedral lithic pictured)

Joub Jannine III (The Gardens) is a Heavy Neolithic site of the Qaraoun culture, 1.5 kilometres (0.93 mi) south of the village along steep slopes and around the houses. It was discovered by Henri Fleisch and Maurice Tallon in 1957. An abundant amount of material was recovered, which included several large flakes and blades along with a finer series of rabots and scrapers that is now held in the Museum of Lebanese Prehistory at the Saint Joseph University. No large bifaces were found at this site. The site may extend through the areas now turned into gardens. It was covered in crops in 1966.

== Landmarks ==
Joub Jannine is home to one of the oldest bridges in Lebanon, the Roman Bridge of Joub Jannine, built in 704. The bridge collapsed in 1943, but was rebuilt with the same rocks. It is located at the entrance of Joub Jannine on Joub Jannine-Chtoura Rd.

During the 2024 Israeli invasion of Lebanon, UNESCO gave enhanced protection to 34 cultural sites including the Roman bridge at Joub Jannine to safeguard it from damage.

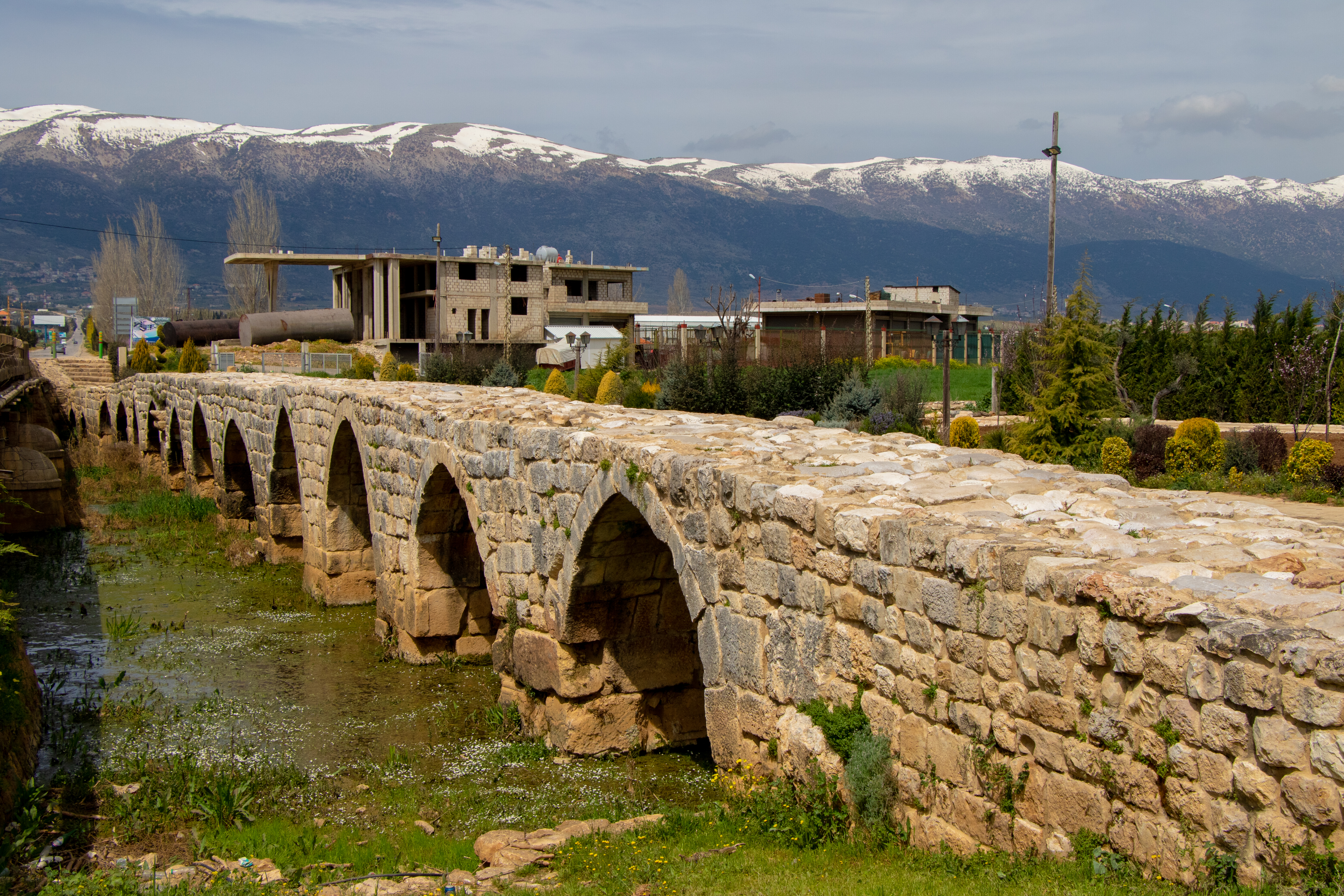
Roman Bridge of Joub Jannine after reconstruction

== Demographics ==
In 2014, Muslims made up 77.51% and Christians made up 22.28% of registered voters in Joub Jannine. 76.32% of the voters were Sunni Muslims, 9.45% were Greek Orthodox and 9.20% were Greek Catholics.

== Bibliography ==
- Robinson, E.; Smith, E. (1841). Biblical Researches in Palestine, Mount Sinai and Arabia Petraea: A Journal of Travels in the year 1838. Vol. 3. Boston: Crocker & Brewster.
