= Khallet Michte =

Archaeological site in Lebanon

- Khallet Michte I, Khallet Michte II
- Location within Lebanon
- 33.116944°N 35.415833°E
- Periods: Heavy Neolithic
- Cultures: Qaraoun culture
- Location: between Bint Jbeil and Ain Ebel, Lebanon

Site notes
- Archaeologists: Henri Fleisch
- Public access: Unknown

Khallet Michte is a Heavy Neolithic archaeological site of the Qaraoun culture located in the Caza of Bint Jbeil in the Nabatiye Governorate in Lebanon. The two sites Khallet Michte I and Khallet Michte II are located in adjacent wadis on south facing slopes between a track and the main road between Bint Jbeil and Ain Ebel. They were found by Henri Fleisch and noted to contain both Heavy Neolithic and Acheulean flint tools which are now in the collection of the Museum of Lebanese Prehistory at the Saint Joseph University.
