= Aammiq =

Archaeological site and village in Lebanon

Aammiq is a village in the Western Beqaa District in Lebanon. It is also the name of an archaeological site.

== Archaeology ==
Aammiq
- Location within Lebanon
- 33.731431°N 35.788983°E
- Type: Tell
- Periods: Natufian, Neolithic, Chalcolithic
- Location: southwest of Zahle; Aammiq Wetland, Lebanon
- Part of: Settlement

History
- Built: c. 12000 BC
- Abandoned: c. 4500 BC

Site notes
- Excavation dates: 1963, 1965, 1971
- Archaeologists: M. Cavalier; Jacques Cauvin; J. Besançon & Francis Hours
- Condition: ruins
- Public access: Yes

Aamiq or Aammiq II is an archaeological site southwest of Zahle in the Aammiq Wetland, Beqaa Valley, Lebanon.

It was first excavated by Jacques Cauvin in 1963, then again by M. Cavalier in 1964, 1965 by Lorraine Copeland and Peter Wescombe and Jacques Besançon & Francis Hours in 1971.

Two periods of inhabitation were found, the first period between 12000 and 10200 cal. BC was Natufian or perhaps preceramic Neolithic where a skeleton was found covered with red ochre. Tools with agricultural purpose included mortars, grinders and stoneware basalt pestles. Other brown flint lithics recovered include a triangle, blades, scrapers and picks, tools suggested pre-natufian occupation. A Late Neolithic period was also detected at around 5000-4500 cal BC (Ubaid period) similar to Late Neolithic Byblos. Ceramics found included some Chalcolithic sherds and lithics included Canaanite blades, axes and adzes, a long, polished plano-convex flint hatchet; many large flakes and blades and sickle elements. A fragment of a stalked arrow is the only trace of occupation between the periods, Chalcolithic occupation followed the older occupation at the edge of the marsh at Mallaha.

The results of a pollen core from Aamiq was published in 2008 suggesting the area was used for grazing in the Neolithic while the Lebanon and Anti-Lebanon mountains were being deforested. This is supported by Heavy Neolithic tools manufactured in specialized workshops such as Kamed el Loz I, Souwan and Wadi Msı'l el Hadd and a special design of flint called an Orange slice found at sites like Majdel Anjar I, Dakwe I and IIHabarjer III, Qaraoun I and II, Kefraya, and Beı'dar Chamou't.
