= Mtaileb =

- Town
- Interactive map of Mtaileb
- Country: Lebanon
- Governorate: Mount Lebanon Governorate
- District: Matn District

Mtaileb I, Mtaileb II
- Location within Lebanon
- 33.923611°N 35.611389°E
- Periods: Heavy Neolithic, Neolithic
- Cultures: Qaraoun culture
- Location: 1.5 kilometres (0.93 mi) east northeast of Antelias (Mtaileb I)
- Region: Mount Lebanon Governorate

Site notes
- Condition: Ruins
- Public access: Yes

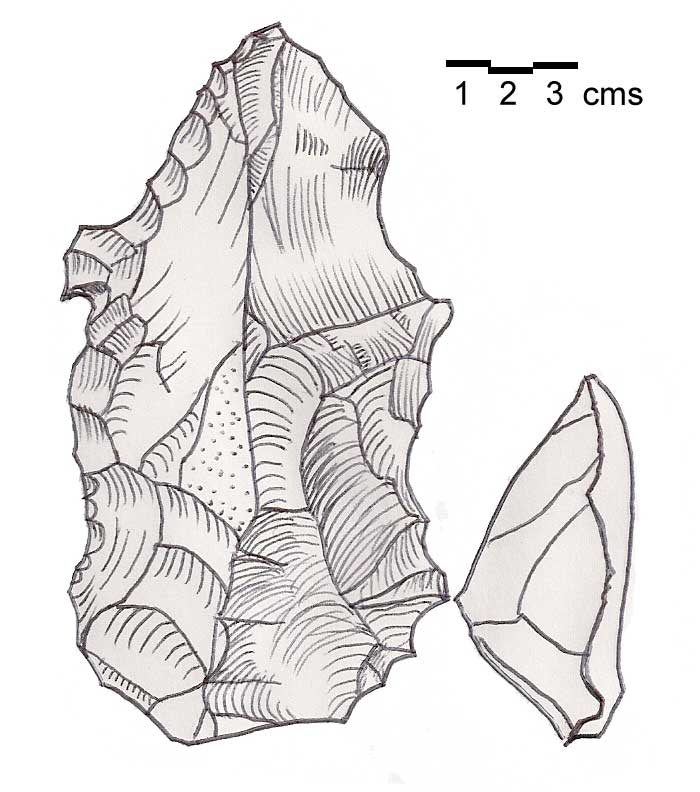
Heavy Neolithic flint tools of the Qaraoun culture found at Mtaileb I - Massive nosed scraper on a flake with irregular jagged edges, notches and "noses".

Mtaileb or Mtayleb (Levantine Arabic: المطيلب, romanized: al-Mṭayleb) is a suburb north of Beirut in the Matn District of Mount Lebanon Governorate in Lebanon. Its inhabitants are almost predominantly Maronite Catholic, with a significant minority of Greek Orthodox followers.

== Mtaileb I ==
Mtaileb I or Rabiya is an archaeological site located 1.5 kilometres (0.93 mi) east northeast of Antelias in a wooded ravine next to a road that zig-zags upwards to the Rabiya Club. The site was discovered by Auguste Bergy in 1941 and a Heavy Neolithic assemblage of the Qaraoun culture consisting of enormous flint tools was collected and now held in the Museum of Lebanese Prehistory marked "1,500 m - 1,800m E.N.E. Antelias". The tools were studied by Jacques Cauvin and said to be made of impure Upper Jurassic flint. The area is now well built up with widely spaced villas and contains flint outcrops under the soil.

== Mtaileb II ==
Mtaileb II is located 900 metres (3,000 ft) west northwest of Mtaileb on the north facing, wooded, sandstone slopes, in a junction of two ravines beneath the main Bikfaya road. A small Neolithic assemblage of tools was collected in beige and grey flint with small axes and picks. One slightly polished trapezoidal axe was found. The material is stored in the Museum of Lebanese Prehistory marked "1500 m S.W. Mazraat-ech-Chaar".
