= Nabi Zair =

Archaeological site in Lebanon

- Periods: Heavy Neolithic, Neolithic
- Cultures: Qaraoun culture
- Location: 1.5 kilometres (0.93 mi) northwest of Anjar, Lebanon

Site notes
- Archaeologists: Auguste Bergy
- Public access: Unknown

Nabi Zair is a Heavy Neolithic archaeological site of the Qaraoun culture approximately 1.5 kilometres (0.93 mi) northwest of Anjar, Lebanon. The site was discovered by Auguste Bergy who found an abundance of flints spread across a wide area around the road between Beirut and Damascus. Bergy found a skull he described as "protohistoric" on the bank of the river near the Nahr Zghail bridge. The skull was studied by Boule in 1939 and gave some evidence of an ancient site in the area. Islamic tombs were also noted in the area.
