= Dakoue =

Dakoue Dakoueh, Dekweh
- Village
- Interactive map of Dakoue
- Country: Lebanon
- Governorate: Beqaa Governorate
- District: Western Beqaa District

Government
  - Mayor: Raymond al-Ghajar

Population (2004)
  - Total: 800

Dakoue
- Location within Lebanon
- 33°41′42″N 35°53′35″E
- Periods: Heavy Neolithic, Neolithic, Roman
- Cultures: Qaraoun culture
- Location: 3 kilometres (1.9 mi) southwest of Mejdel Anjar, Lebanon

Site notes
- Public access: Unknown

Dakoue (also spelled Dakoueh, or Dekweh) is a village located 3 kilometres (1.9 mi) southwest of Mejdel Anjar, Lebanon. It is predominantly inhabited by shepherds and farmers.

== Heavy Neolithic site of the Qaraoun culture ==
There is a Heavy Neolithic archaeological site of the Qaraoun culture located 700 metres (2,300 ft) northwest of the village where plentiful Heavy Neolithic flint adzes, axes, debitage and waste material were found along with large amounts of Paleolithic materials.

== Roman temple ==
Behind the village there are the ruins of a Roman temple that still retains a central courtyard and a front colonnade composed of three columns. The temple was converted into a church and a chapel can be accessed via an opening in the west wall. There is a path leading from the temple to an ancient graveyard with tombs and sarcophagi. George Taylor noted the temple was aligned to the south west and classified it as a Prostylos temple. He noted that the decoration of the window, cornice and capital displayed a design unique in Lebanon.
