= Tell Zenoub =

Archaeological site in Lebanon

Tall Znoub تل ذنوب
- Village
- Location in Lebanon
- Coordinates: 33°39′37″N 35°46′40″E
- Country: Lebanon
- Governorate: Beqaa Governorate
- District: Western Beqaa
- Time zone: UTC+2 (EET)
  - Summer (DST): +3

Tell Zenoub
- Interactive map of Tell Zenoub
- Periods: Heavy Neolithic, Neolithic
- Cultures: Qaraoun culture
- Location: 4 kilometres (2.5 mi) north northeast of Joub Jannine, Lebanon

Site notes
- Public access: Unknown

Tell Zenoub (Levantine Arabic: تل ذنوب, romanized: Tell Zanūb) is a local authority in the Western Beqaa District in Lebanon

== History ==
Tell Zenoub is also an archaeological site of the Qaraoun culture that is located 4 kilometres (2.5 mi) north northeast of Joub Jannine, Lebanon. Although later occupation was detected, numerous Heavy Neolithic flints were found in fields south of the tell.

In 1838, Eli Smith noted Tell Zenoub as being a village in the Beqaa Valley.

== Bibliography ==
- Robinson, E.; Smith, E. (1841). Biblical Researches in Palestine, Mount Sinai and Arabia Petraea: A Journal of Travels in the year 1838. Vol. 3. Boston: Crocker & Brewster.
