= Tell Khardane =

Archaeological site in Lebanon

- Periods: Heavy Neolithic, Neolithic
- Cultures: Qaraoun culture
- Location: north northeast of Amuq (Lebanon), Lebanon

Site notes
- Public access: Unknown

Tell Khardane is a Heavy Neolithic archaeological site of the Qaraoun culture north northeast of Aammiq, Lebanon on the road to Chtaura. Several Heavy Neolithic flints including picks, scrapers, blades and flakes were found in fields that surround the tell mound. Many had been produced using the Levallois technique.
