= Akbiyeh =

Archaeological site in Lebanon

- Type: black soil area
- Periods: Heavy Neolithic, Neolithic
- Cultures: Qaraoun culture
- Location: 12 kilometres (7.5 mi) south of Sidon, Lebanon

Site notes
- Excavation dates: 1894
- Archaeologists: Godefroy Zumoffen
- Condition: under cultivation
- Public access: Yes

Akbiyeh is an archaeological site approximately 12 kilometres (7.5 mi) south of Sidon, northeast of Ain Kantarah in Lebanon. The area of black soil around 600 metres (2,000 ft) by 30 metres (98 ft) was found by Godefroy Zumoffen in 1894. Material recovered is in the Museum of Lebanese Prehistory including four bifaces of Lower Paleolithic form along with a variety of material suggested to be Middle Paleolithic and Heavy Neolithic of the Qaraoun culture. These include a number of rectangular picks, rough cores and flakes in various conditions. The site is now under cultivation.
