= Heavy Neolithic =

Style of large stone and flint tools

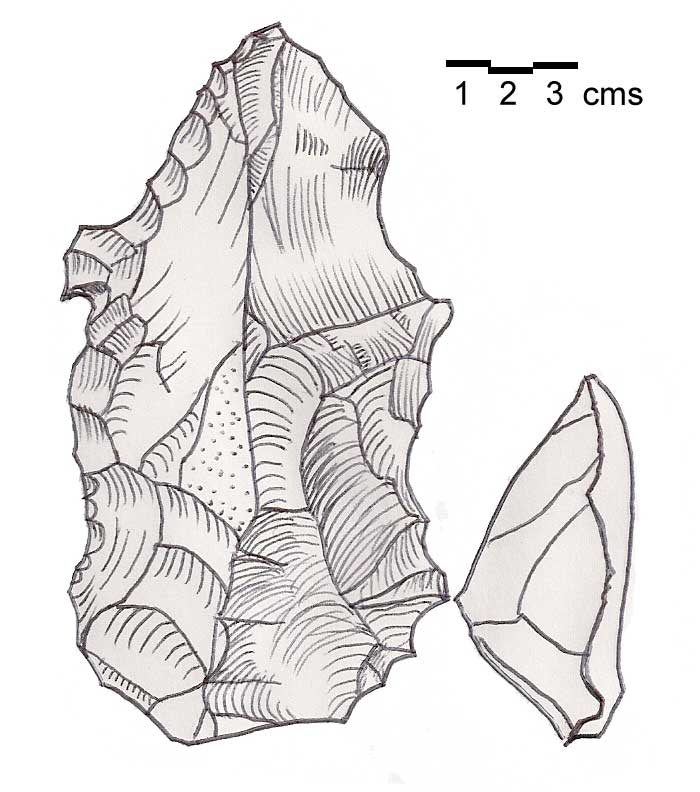
Heavy Neolithic tools of the Qaraoun culture found at Mtaileb I - Massive nosed scraper on a flake with irregular jagged edges, notches and "noses". Light grey and streaky silicious limestone.

Heavy Neolithic (alternatively, Gigantolithic) is a style of large stone and flint tools (or industry) associated primarily with the Qaraoun culture in the Beqaa Valley, Lebanon, dating to the Epipaleolithic or early Pre-Pottery Neolithic at the end of the Stone Age. The type site for the Qaraoun culture is Qaraoun II.

== Naming ==
The term "Heavy Neolithic" was translated by Lorraine Copeland and Peter J. Wescombe from Henri Fleisch's term "gros Neolithique", suggested by Dorothy Garrod (in a letter dated February 1965) for adoption to describe the particular flint industry that was identified at sites near Qaraoun in the Beqaa Valley. The industry was also termed "Gigantolithic" and confirmed as Neolithic by Alfred Rust and Dorothy Garrod.

== Characteristics ==
Gigantolithic was initially mistaken for Acheulean or Levalloisian by some scholars. Diana Kirkbride and Henri de Contenson suggested that it existed over a wide area of the fertile crescent. Heavy Neolithic industry occurred before the invention of pottery and is characterized by huge, coarse, heavy tools such as axes, picks and adzes including bifaces. There is no evidence of polishing at the Qaraoun sites or indeed of any arrowheads, burins or millstones. Henri Fleisch noted that the culture that produced this industry may well have led a forest way of life before the dawn of agriculture. Jacques Cauvin proposed that some of the sites discovered may have been factories or workshops as many artifacts recovered were rough outs. James Mellaart suggested the industry dated to a period before the Pottery Neolithic at Byblos (10,600 to 6900 BC according to the ASPRO chronology) and noted, "Aceramic cultures have not yet been found in excavations but they must have existed here as it is clear from Ras Shamra and from the fact that the Pre-Pottery B complex of Palestine originated in this area, just as the following Pottery Neolithic cultures can be traced back to the Lebanon." Maya Haidar Boustani has called for discussion on the chronological problem when reliable data on the flint workshops becomes available. She looked towards the work of Ron Barkai and H. Taute as being of possible use in this research.

A notable stratified excavation of Heavy Neolithic material took place at Adloun II (Bezez Cave), conducted by Diana Kirkbride and Dorothy Garrod. Materials extracted from the upper layers were however disturbed. The morphology of the tools has noted similarities to the Campignian industry in France. Due to the disturbance of the upper layers and lack of radiocarbon dating or the materials at the time of this excavation, the placement of the Qaroun culture into the chronology of the ancient Near East remains undetermined from these excavations.

The industry has been found at surface stations in the Beqaa Valley and on the seaward side of the mountains. Heavy Neolithic sites were found near sources of flint and were thought to be factories or workshops where large, coarse flint tools were roughed out to work and chop timber. Chisels, flake scrapers and picks were also found with little, if any sign of arrowheads, sickles (except for Orange slices) or pottery. Finds of waste and debris at the sites were usually plentiful, normally consisting of Orange slices, thick and crested blades, discoid, cylindrical, pyramidal or Levallois cores. Andrew Moore suggested that many of the sites were used as flint factories that complimented settlements in the surrounding hills.

The identification of Heavy Neolithic sites in Lebanon was complicated by the fact that the assemblages found at these sites included tools made with all techniques used during earlier periods. Bifaces are found both with and without a cortex, along with grattoir de cote, triangular flakes, tortoise cores, discoid cores and steep scrapers. This presented particular problems with sites where Heavy Neolithic material was mixed with that from the Lower Paleolithic and Middle Paleolithic, such as at Mejdel Anjar I and Dakoue. Although tools similar to Heavy Neolithic ones were found at later Neolithic surfaces sites, little relationship could be established between those found at the later Neolithic tells, where flints were often sparse, especially at those of later dates. The relationship and dividing line between the related Shepherd Neolithic zone of the north Bekaa Valley could also not be clearly defined but was suggested to be in the area around Douris and Qalaat Tannour. Not enough exploration has been carried out yet to conclude whether the bands of Neolithic surface sites continues north into the areas around Zahle and Rayak.

== Sites ==
Apart from the type site, Qaraoun II, other sites with Heavy Neolithic finds include Qaraoun I, Adloun II, Akbiyeh, Beit Mery II, Dikwene II, Hadeth South, Jbaa, Jebel Aabeby, Jdeideh I, Jdeideh III, Mtaileb I (Rabiya), Ourrouar II, Sin el Fil, Sarafand, Tell Mureibit near Kasimiyeh, Fadaous Sud, Baidar ech Chamout, Kfar Tebnit, Wadi Koura, Wadi Yaroun and other suggested sites at Flaoui, Sidon III, the Akkar plain foothills and the Plain of Zghorta. Others found in the Beqaa Valley include Ard Saouda, Nabi Zair, Tell Khardane, Mejdel Anjar I, Dakoue, Kefraya, Tell Zenoub, Kamid al lawz I, Bustan Birke, Joub Jannine III, Amlaq Qatih, Tayibe, Taire II, Khallet Michte I, Khallet Michte II, Khallet el Hamra, Douwara, Douris and Moukhtara with other possible sites at Tell Ain el Meten and El Biré. The Heavy Neolithic industry has also been identified at the Palestinian archaeological sites around Wadi al-Far'a; (Wadi Farah, Shemouniyeh and Wadi Sallah (occupational) excavated by Francis Turville-Petre.

== Gallery ==
Double ended pick, triangular section with narrowing, jagged edges at both ends.

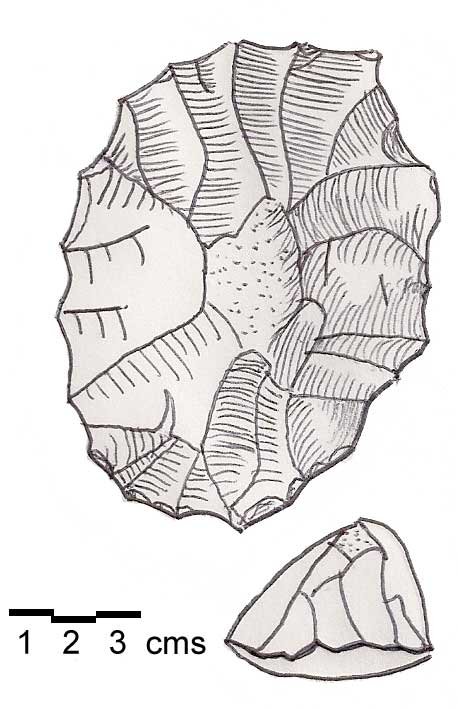
Mini blade core on a split cobble.

Thick and heavy biface, retouched all over with jagged and irregular edges.
