= Tell Mureibit =

Archaeological site in Lebanon

- Periods: Heavy Neolithic, Neolithic
- Cultures: Qaraoun culture
- Location: 8 kilometres (5 mi) north of Tyre, Lebanon

Site notes
- Archaeologists: E. Passemard
- Public access: Unknown

Tell Mureibit is a Heavy Neolithic archaeological site approximately 8 kilometres (5 mi) north of Tyre, Lebanon. It is located in a wadi near Qasimiye, Qasimiyeh or Kasimiyeh on the north bank of the Litani river. Material was collected by E. Passemard which is kept in the National Museum of Beirut. It consists of heavy, rough and usually bifacial tools of indeterminate date that has been likened to other Heavy Neolithic material of the Qaraoun culture.
