= Plain of Zgharta =

Archaeological site in Lebanon

- Location within Lebanon
- 34.4°N 35.9°E
- Periods: Heavy Neolithic (originally confused with Mousterian)
- Cultures: Qaraoun culture
- Location: East and southeast of Tripoli, Lebanon

Site notes
- Archaeologists: R. Wetzel, J. Haller
- Condition: terraced and under cultivation
- Public access: Yes

The Plain of Zgharta or Zghorta is a Heavy Neolithic archaeological site approximately 7 kilometres (4.3 mi) east and southeast of Tripoli in Lebanon. It has historically been a region known for growing sumptuous olives owing to early Quaternary, cemented fluvatile deposits that cover the land beneath the topsoil (known as the Conglomerates of Zgharta or the Conglomerates of Zghorta). The site was documented by R. Wetzel and J. Haller in 1945 who discuss surface finds of several large flakes and atypical bifaces from this area and ended up giving them a very improbable label of Mousterian. Lorraine Copeland deduced the likelihood that these pieces were Gigantolithic tools, once used by the Qaraoun culture to chop down Cedars of Lebanon to start the Neolithic Revolution.
