= Hadath, Mount Lebanon =

Hadat الحدث
- Location in Lebanon
- Coordinates: 33.835°N 35.536°E
- Country: Lebanon
- Governorate: Mount Lebanon
- District: Baabda

Area
  - Total: 1,563 ha (3,860 acres)

Hadeth
- Location within Lebanon
- 33.850518°N 35.527864°E
- Periods: Heavy Neolithic, Neolithic
- Cultures: Qaraoun culture
- Location: 7 kilometres (4.3 mi) south southeast of Beirut, Lebanon
- Region: Mount Lebanon Governorate

Site notes
- Archaeologists: Auguste Bergy
- Condition: built up
- Public access: Yes

Hadath (Arabic: الحدت) is a municipality in the Baabda District of the Mount Lebanon Governorate in Lebanon. It borders the southern periphery of the Lebanese capital Beirut and is considered part of its metropolitan area. Originally a village it was founded by the Jamous (lit: Buffalo) family. There is also a Jamous St in Beirut, named after the same family.

The place includes a Heavy Neolithic archaeological site approximately 7 kilometres (4.3 mi) south southeast of Beirut, on the old road to Sidon. It was discovered and a collection made by Auguste Bergy from a spur near a ravine south of the last houses in the village. Heavy Neolithic material of the Qaraoun culture was found of an atypical variety with large, rough flakes including picks, choppers and cores. Some examples showed evidence of burin impacts and twisted forms. The area is now built up.

== Demographics ==
In 2014, Christians made up 90.63% and Muslims made up 8.61% of registered voters in Hadath. 59.85% of the voters were Maronite Catholics, 13.06% were Greek Orthodox and 10.60% were Greek Catholics.
