= Douwara =

Archaeological site in Lebanon

- Location within Lebanon
- 33.096944°N 35.390278°E
- Periods: Heavy Neolithic, Chalcolithic
- Cultures: Qaraoun culture
- Location: 2 kilometres (1.2 mi) southwest of Ain Ebel, Lebanon
- Region: Nabatieh Governorate

Site notes
- Excavation dates: 1950
- Archaeologists: Henri Fleisch
- Public access: Yes

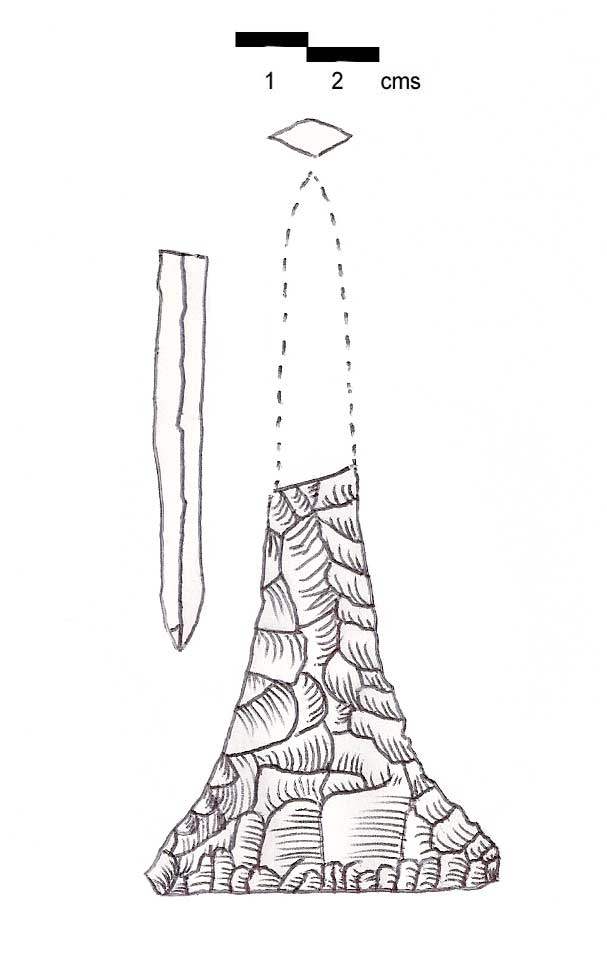
Minet ed Dhalia point similar to those amongst the Chalcolithic finds at Douwara

Douwara is a Heavy Neolithic archaeological site of the Qaraoun culture located 2 kilometres (1.2 mi) southwest of Ain Ebel in the Bint Jbeil District of Nabatieh Governorate in Lebanon. It is located on slopes north of the road from Ain Ebel to Rmaich.

It was discovered by Jesuit priest Henri Fleisch, whilst out prospecting for prehistoric sites in 1950, who published his findings in 1951 and 1954. The collections from the site were also discussed by Jacques Cauvin. Vast numbers of heavy tools were found representing the industry of the Qaroun culture including piles of debitage and bifaces. Another industry present at the site was tentatively identified as Chalcolithic and included axes, chisels and heavy borers that resembled Minet ed Dhalia points.
