= Scraper (archaeology) =

Prehistoric tool type

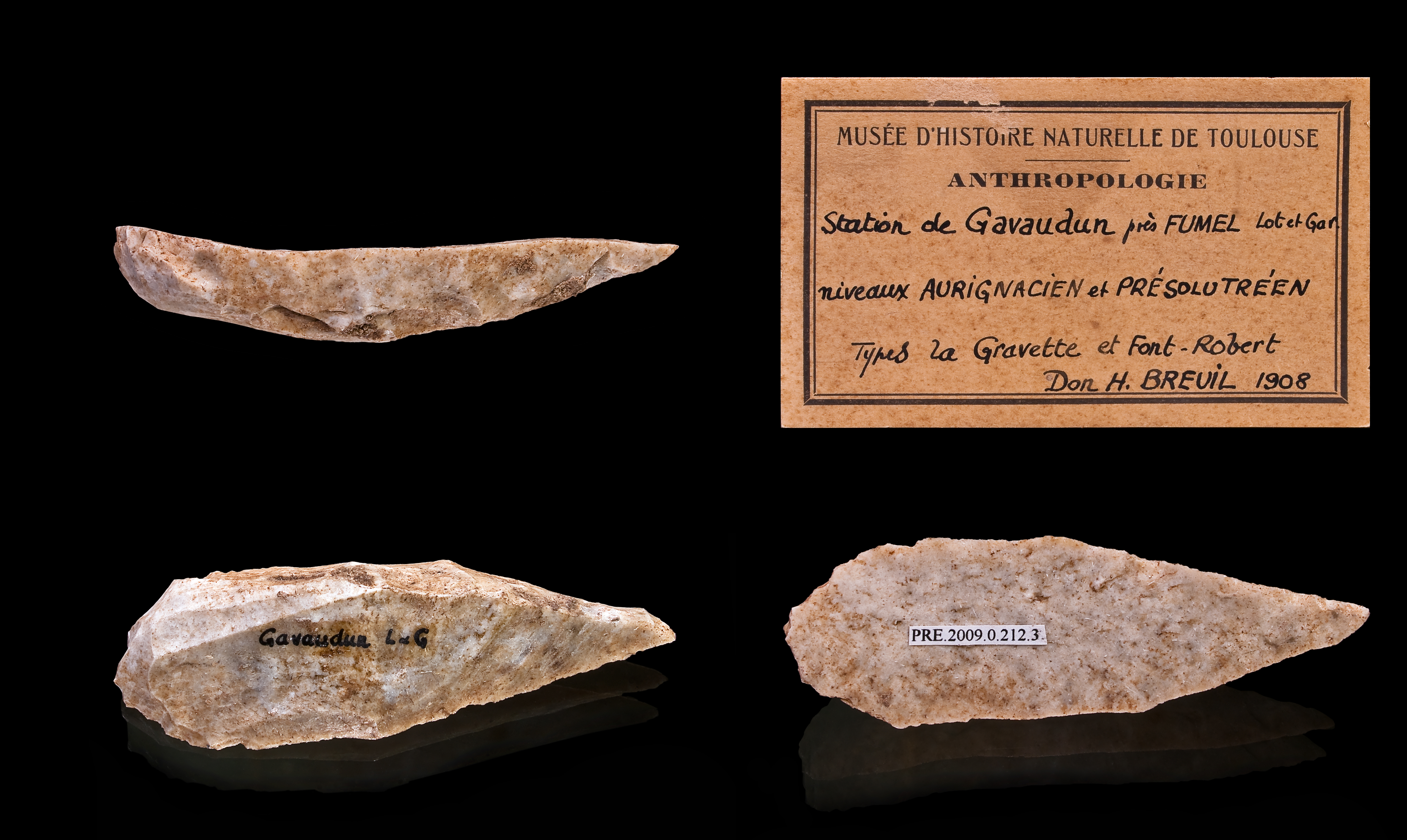
Scraper - Aurignacian - Muséum of Toulouse

In prehistoric archaeology, scrapers are unifacial tools thought to have been used for hideworking and woodworking. Many lithic analysts maintain that the only true scrapers are defined on the base of use-wear, and usually are those that were worked on the distal ends of blades—i.e., "end scrapers" (French: grattoir). Other scrapers include the so-called "side scrapers" or racloirs, which are made on the longest side of a flake, and notched scrapers, which have a cleft on either side that may have been used to attach them to something else.

Scrapers are typically formed by chipping the end of a flake of stone in order to create one sharp side and to keep the rest of the sides dull to facilitate grasping it. Most scrapers are either circle or blade-like in shape. The working edges of scrapers tend to be convex, and many have trimmed and dulled lateral edges to facilitate hafting. One important variety of scraper is the thumbnail scraper, a scraper shaped much like its namesake. This scraper type is common at Paleo-Indian sites in North America. Scrapers are one of the most varied lithic tools found at archaeological sites. Due to the vast array of scrapers there are many typologies that scrapers can fall under, including tool size, tool shape, tool base, the number of working edges, edge angle, edge shape, and many more.

== Method of use ==
The edge of the scraper that is extremely angled is the working edge. This edge is often used to soften hides or to clean meat off of the hides, in addition to being used for wood work. As the term scraper suggests, this tool was scraped at the hide or wood in order to reach the end goal. Scrapers were also made in order to skin animals.

Scrapers tended to be large enough to fit comfortably in the hand and could be used without being mounted on wood or bone. However, it is very likely that scrapers were mounted on short handles even though it is very rare to find mounted scrapers. As scrapers are used they have to be resharpened in order to stay effective. This causes them to get progressively smaller as they are used, resharpened, used, resharpened, and used again. Consequently, the majority of the scrapers that are found on sites are ones that have been resharpened and used to the point of being no longer functional.

== Categories ==
The two main classifications of scrapers are either end scrapers or side scrapers. End scrapers have working edges on one or both ends of a blade or flake, whereas side scrapers have a working edge along one of the long sides. There are a couple of types of scrapers based on their specific use when it comes to wood and hide or based on the shape and design of the scraper itself. The grattoir is a type of scraper usually made of flint and its main uses were to work wood and to clean hides. This type of scraper has its working edge along the long axis of the blade. The nose scraper typically has a smaller working edge either at both ends or just one end. This type of scraper is made from a convex blade and is used in more fine tuning work. The hollow scraper is a type of scraper that has a notch worked into the side or end of the scraper.

== Typologies ==
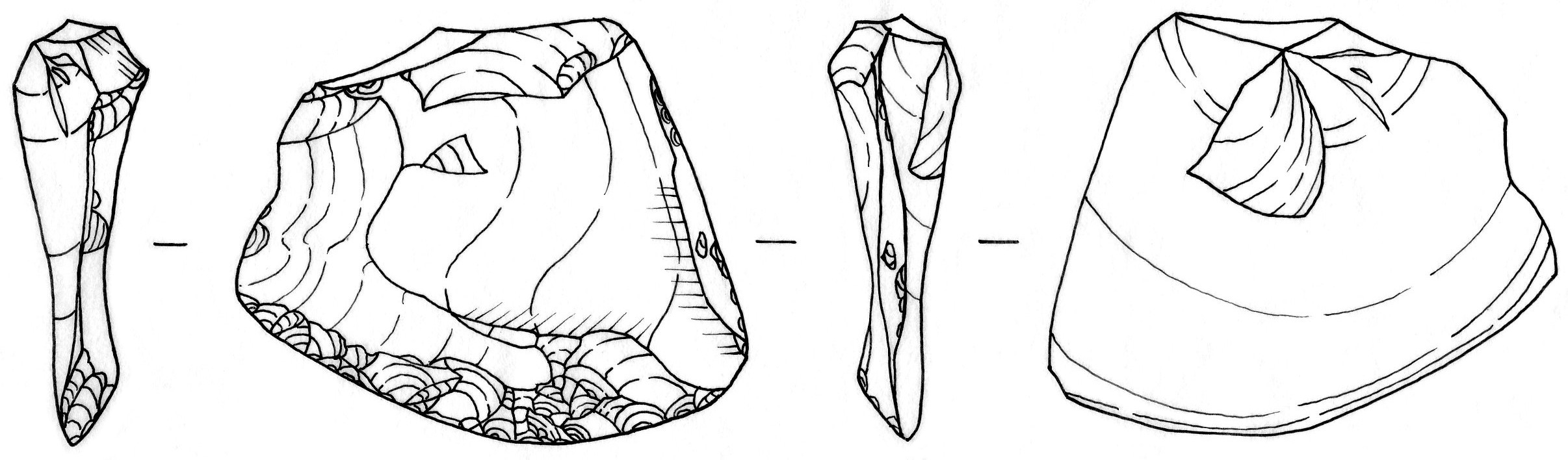
Convex transverse scraper

Tool size: This can be determined by either weight or dimensions and typically divided into either large or small scrapers. Tool shape: There are many different shapes scrapers can be, including rectangular, triangular, irregular, discoidal, domed, or keeled. In many cases it can be hard to determine the classification for the shape of the scraper. The shape of the scraper is often considered diagnostic. Shaping vs. Use Damage: Scrapers are often divided between ones that have been purposefully shaped for a specific use and ones that have been shaped due to their use. Tool base: Scrapers are classified based on if they originated from a blade or a flake. Number of working edges: Some scrapers have only one working edge while other scrapers have two working edges. It is extremely uncommon for there to be a scraper with three working edges. Edge angle: Some scrapers have vertical working edges while other scrapers have acute working edges. Edge shape: There is distinction between concave, straight, and convex working edges on scrapers. Location of functional edges: One of the main distinctions in scrapers, depends on if the working edge is on the end or the side of the scraper.
