= Majdal Anjar =

Majdal Anjar مجدل عنجر Majdal ʿAnjar
- Village
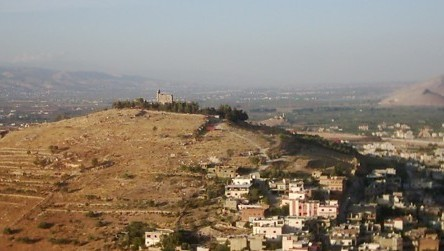

- Location in Lebanon
- Coordinates: 33°42′27″N 35°54′14″E
- Country: Lebanon
- Governorate: Beqaa Governorate
- District: Zahle District

Government
  - Mayor: Ayman Mostafa Abou Haikel

Area
  - Total: 9.90 sq mi (25.65 km^{2})
- Elevation: 3,180 ft (970 m)

Population (2006)
  - Total: 23,000
- Time zone: UTC+2 (EST)
  - Summer (DST): +3
- Website: Majdal Anjar official web site

Majdal Anjar (Arabic: مجدل عنجر, romanized: Majdal ʿAnjar; also transliterated Majdel Anjar) is a village of Beqaa Governorate, Lebanon. Majdal Anjar is an overwhelmingly Sunni Muslim town.

== Geography ==
Majdal Anjar is one of the Bekaa Valley towns of the east. It is located on the international road linking Beirut and Damascus through Lebanon and Syria's Masnaa Border Crossing, about 55 km from the Lebanese capital and 57 kilometers from Damascus. Rise of 970 m above sea level. An area of 25,642,775 square meters. A population of about 25,000 people. It borders Sawiri from east and south, Anjar from north and Dakwi and Rawda from west.

== Agriculture ==
The most important crops are cereals, including: wheat, barley, lentil, grapes, potatoes, beets, nuts, peaches apricots, cherry, pomegranate, almonds, olives, raspberries, apples, onions, tomatoes, zucchini, cabbage, cauliflower, watermelon, lettuce, radishes, parsley, mint, garlic, beans, kidney beans, etc.

== Industry ==
Nothing more than a simple primitive industry, and food industry, including bread, sugar, flour, and the construction industry. A sugar factory was founded in 1958 in Majdal Anjar.

== Trade ==
The town of Majdal Anjar is a complex interaction between Lebanon and the Arab states. There are custom offices along the border region.

== Tourism ==
The Temple at Majdal Anjar that was later converted into a castle, dates back to the reign of Herod of Chalkis who is thought to be the builder of this temple. It is also next to Anjar which hosts the Umayyad era ruins which are considered a world heritage site .

== History ==
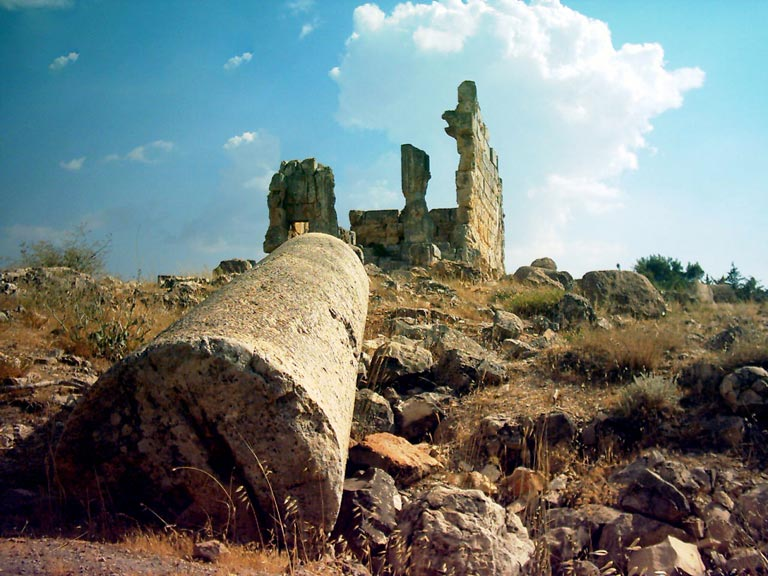
Majdal Anjar Temple

In 1838, Eli Smith noted Mejdel 'Anjar as a Sunni Muslim village in the Beqaa Valley.

In the 2nd century BCE, the Itureans, an Arab tribe from modern-day Jordan, settled in the southern Bekaa Valley and established the city of Chalkis. Following the Roman conquest of the region, Emperor Claudius granted the area to Herod of Chalkis, a great-grandson of Herod the Great, who ruled from 41 to 48 CE. It is likely that Herod of Chalkis constructed the temple now visible at Majdel Anjar, located about three kilometers southwest of the more prominent ruins of the Umayyad city of Anjar. The site controlled a key route to Damascus. The Abbasids later dismantled the temple, converting it into a fortress.

Inside the town there is a mosque called "Omar bin al-Khattab," built by Walid bin Abdul Malik bin Marwan.

During the 2024 Israeli invasion of Lebanon, UNESCO gave enhanced protection to 34 cultural sites in Lebanon including the temple at Majdal Anjar to safeguard it from damage.

== Archaeology ==
Majdel Anjar I is a large site, 1.5 kilometres (0.93 mi) northwest of the village where Jesuit archaeologist, Auguste Bergy found numerous flint tools that dated to various periods. He identified a Heavy Neolithic assemblage of the Qaraoun culture that consisted of chisels, axes cores and other debris.

Majdal Anjar II or Tell Majdal Anjar is 2 kilometres (1.2 mi) north of the village near the road. Lorraine Copeland commented that "sackfulls" of Neolithic flints could be recovered from the area when she visited, including large cutting tools. The tell shows deposits with finds consisting of pottery sherds, flints and part of a stoneware bowl. Also found were scapers, burins, trapezoidal axes and segmented sickles with fine denticulation. Pottery was both fine and coarse featuring red washing, burnishing and incisions. Finds were similar to middle Neolithic levels of Byblos and Ard Tlaili.

== Bibliography ==
- Robinson, E.; Smith, E. (1841). Biblical Researches in Palestine, Mount Sinai and Arabia Petraea: A Journal of Travels in the year 1838. Vol. 3. Boston: Crocker & Brewster.
