= Racloir =

Type of flint tool

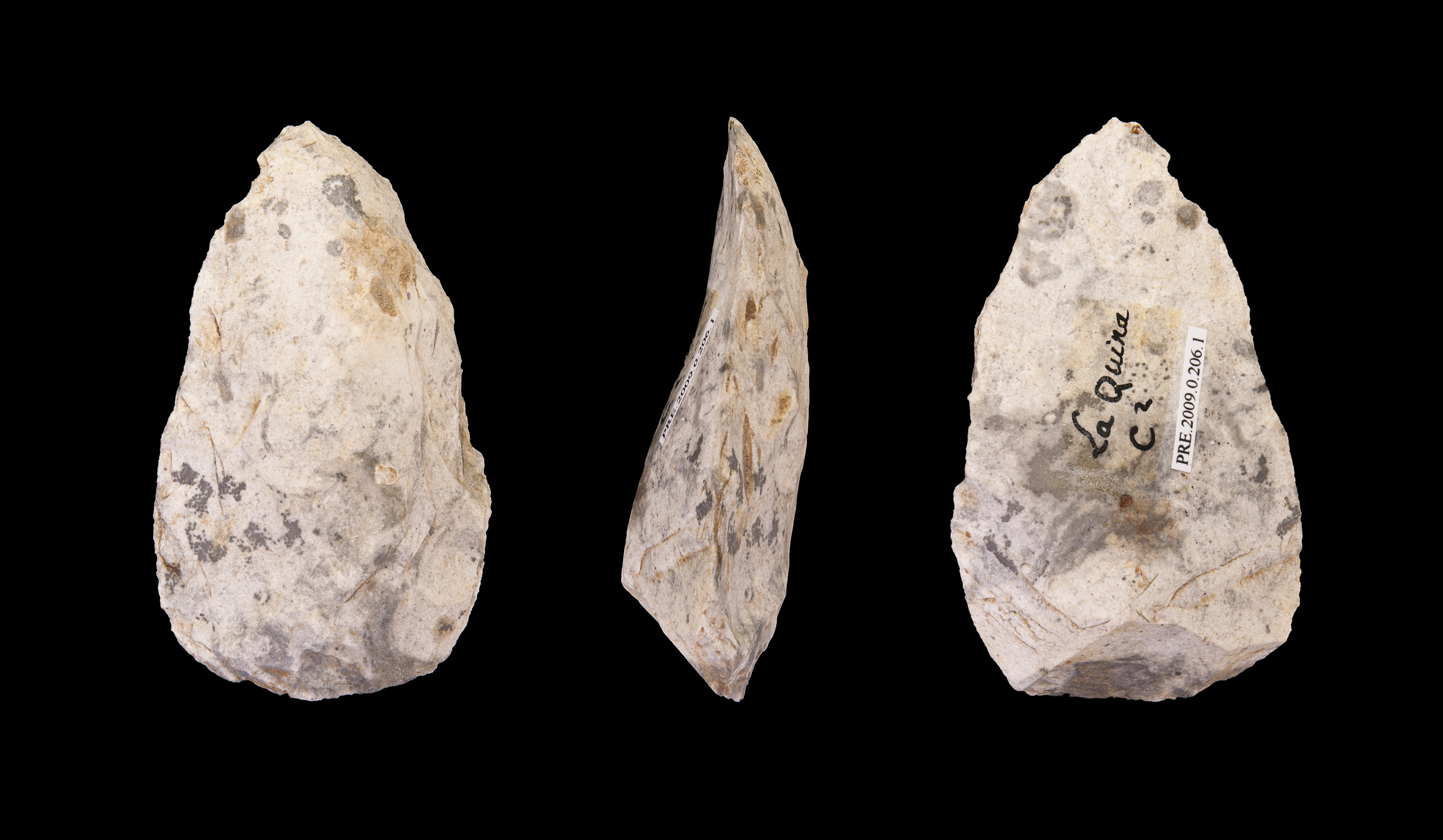
Type of Mousterian Racloir

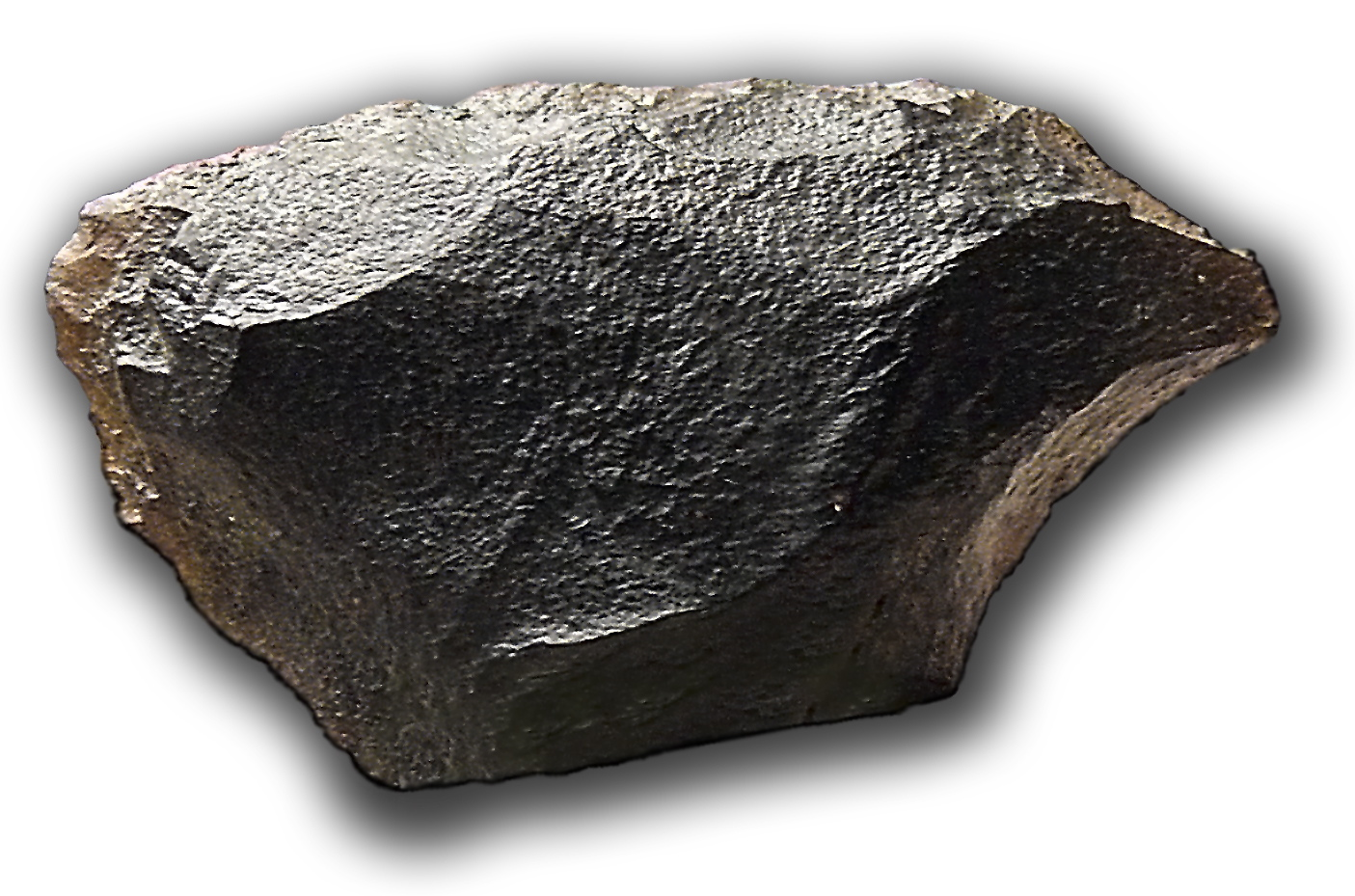
Racloir from Galería (TG11) of Atapuerca

In archaeology, a racloir, also known as racloirs sur talon (French for "scraper on heel"), is a type of flint tool made by prehistoric peoples.

== Description ==
The racloir is a type of side scraper distinctive of Mousterian assemblages. It is created from a flint flake and looks like a large scraper. As well as being used for scraping hides and bark, it may also have been used as a knife.

Racloirs are most associated with the Neanderthal Mousterian industry. These racloirs are retouched along the ridge between the striking platform and the dorsal face. They have shaped edges and are modified by abrupt flaking from the dorsal face.
