= List of caves in Lebanon =

This is a list of caves in Lebanon.

== List ==
- Achtarout
- Afqa
- Ain al-Bared
- Ain Seraaya
- Ain al-Libné
- Ain Chara
- al-Aaouamide
- al-Ain
- al-Choériyeh
- al-Daamiyé
- al-Dabaa
- al-Haoua 1
- al-Jiyyé
- al-Kassarate
- al-Mhadded
- al-Rihane
- al-Rmeïlé
- al-Saouda
- al-Souwwane
- al-Tallé
- al-Terrache
- an-Nouâhir
- Birket Aanjar
- Delmass Cave
- Dechouniyé
- Dominou
- er-Roueiss
- Fakhreddine
- Fnaïdeq
- Hanna Boustani
- Haskane
- Jbab
- Jeita
- Joualmane
- Kafarhim
- Kfar Sghab
- Kfar Zabad
- Lehfed
- Mabaage
- Mar Assia
- Mar Challita
- Mar Sarkis
- Marj ed-Debb
- Mikha
- Nabaa al-Chataoui
- Nabaa al-Hadid
- Nabaa al-Jaouz
- Nabaa al-Jouaïzat
- Nabaa al-Kiddab
- Nabaa al-Mghara
- Nabaa al-Moutrane
- Nabaa al-Saqié (al-fawqa)
- Nabaa al-Saqié (al-tahta)
- Nabaa Bou Safi
- Nabaa ech-Cheikh
- Nabaa er-Rahoué
- Nabaa Ghaouaghit
- Nabaa Hayssa
- Nabaa Iskandar
- Nabaa Qatra
- Nachcharini
- Ouadi al-Hadid
- Qadisha
- Qashqoush
- Ras al-Nabaa
- Ras Beyrouth
- Ras El Kelb
- Rechmi
- Saddiqîne
- Saleh
- Salem
- Touaïté
- zbaïne
- Zob Atta
- Zod

== See also ==
- List of caves
- Speleology
