= Qaraoun =

- Village
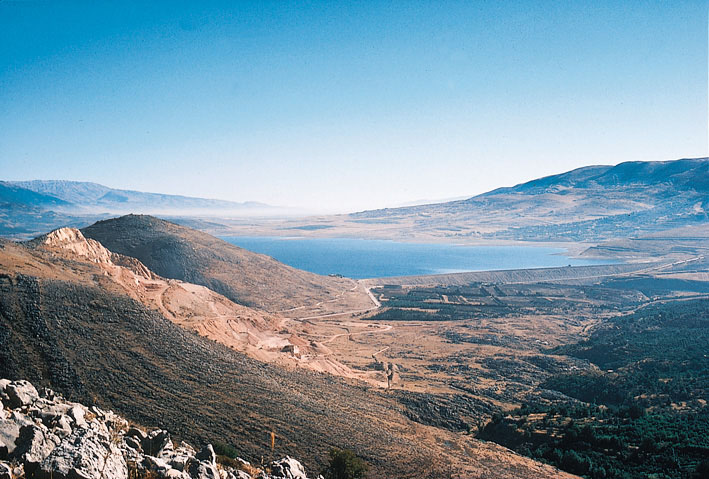
- Lake Qaraoun or Lake Litani, upstream of Qaraoun village in the Beqaa Valley in Lebanon

- Location in Lebanon
- Coordinates: 33°33′48″N 35°43′19″E
- Country: Lebanon
- Governorate: Beqaa Governorate
- District: Western Beqaa District

Area
  - Village: 5.64 sq mi (14.60 km^{2})
  - Land: 5.64 sq mi (14.60 km^{2})
  - Urban: 1.4 sq mi (3.6 km^{2})
- Elevation: 2,600 ft (790 m)

Population
  - Village: 7,000

Qaraoun is a Lebanese village, 85 km from Beirut, known for its Lake Qaraoun in the Beqaa Valley formed by the El Wauroun Dam built in 1959. It is an ecologically fragile zone in the Western Beqaa District. The village lies about 800 m above sea level. The dam is located nearby on the Litani River.

== Geography ==
The village is delimited by Majdel Balhis on the east, Aitanite on the west, Baaloul on the north and Sohmor on the south. The ecoregion of the village has now a land area of 1460 ha, with 1100 ha of it under agriculture including 400 ha under irrigation and the balance agricultural area is rainfed. When the El Qaraoun Dam was built on the Litani River (the longest river in Lebanon) in 1959, Qaraoun village, lying on its left bank transferred an area of 740 ha for the development of the project. The ecoregions habitat composition is a delicate interface of dry lands with the riverine and lacustrine zones.

== Demographics, economy and development ==
The population of the village is around 7,000.

The development activity near the village, consequent to land area the Qaraoun village transferred for building of the El Qaraoun Dam in the middle reaches of the Litani River, which created an artificial lake (33°34′11.63″N 35°41′51.18″E) with water spread area of 1190 ha (the largest body of freshwater in Lebanon). The dam, which created the artificial lake or reservoir, is the largest dam built in Lebanon for multipurpose uses of hydropower generation (190 MW), irrigation (28,500 ha) and drinking water supply. It is a concrete-faced rockfill dam (CFRD) of 61 m height built with crest level at EL 801 m with a dam length of 1090 m, over karstic limestone formations. The reservoir has a storage capacity of 220 million cubic metres at maximum pond elevation of 858 m.

The lake environment includes woodland, orchards and low-growing scrubs; it attracts about 20,000 migratory birds such as storks, pelicans and wintering fowl. The ferruginous duck (Aythya nyroca), pallid harrier (Circus macrourus), greater spotted eagle (Aquila clanga), eastern imperial eagle (Aquila heliaca) and sociable lapwing (Vanellus gregarius) are some of the birds which are of conservation concern according to the 2008 IUCN Red List.

== Archaeology ==
Heavy Neolithic pick of the Qaraoun culture found at Mtaileb I - Double ended pick, triangular section with narrowing, jagged edges at both ends. Light grey and streaky silicious limestone.

The town gives its name to the Neolithic Qaraoun culture of the Beqaa Valley notable for the Heavy Neolithic flint industry. There are several archaeological sites in the area.

== Qaraoun I (Left Bank) ==
Qaraoun I is a Heavy Neolithic archaeological site of the Qaraoun culture, located on the left side of the Litani river, a little downstream from the Qaraoun Dam. It is an open site on the slope overlooking the river, west of the road to Kaukaba in stony fields about 200 m before a descent in the road that passes the dam. It was recorded as being 100 m down from the branching point of the Litani and north Cheeta at 300 m north of cote 801. Flint tools were found on the top of limestone cliffs where some soil had fallen away into a wadi. The site was discovered by Dubertret and studied by Henri Fleisch in a publication of 1954 along with Jacques Cauvin in 1963. Materials recovered include picks, scrapers and axes with an abundance of waste blades, flakes and Levallois cores amongst others. Material was confirmed as a Heavy Neolithic site by Henri Fleisch in a personal communication to Lorraine Copeland in 1965. It is stored in the Museum of Lebanese Prehistory at Saint Joseph University and resembles the finds from Qaraoun II. Another collection was made on a visit with J. King in 1966 that included long blades, a few tidy bifaces, picks, rabots and huge Levallois cores. Collections made at this site in 1900 are also held in Croatia at the Archaeological Museum, Zagreb Museum Laboratory and in Bosnia and Herzegovina at the Museum of Sarajevo.

== Qaraoun II (Right Bank) ==
Qaraoun II is the type site of the Heavy Neolithic Qaraoun culture in the Beqaa valley. It is located on top of a gorge on the right of the river. It is 100 m west of the branching point of the Litani and the north Cheeta, 700 m northeast of the base of the west Beliete, 100 m west of cote 833. It was found by Dubertret and studied by Henri Fleisch with publications covering the site in 1951, 1954 and 1960. A large number of flints were found in numerous collections in 1952, 1954, 1958, 1959, 1961, 1963, 1964, 1966, 1968 and 1970. Studies of the materials were carried out by Jacques Cauvin and Marie-Claire Cauvin. It was also discussed by W. Van Liere and Henri de Contenson in 1963. A large area of the site was completely destroyed by construction of workmen's houses leaving only a small section of original surface when surveyed in 1966 when another collection was made in 1966 by Lorraine Copeland in July 1966 that rescued several quality pieces. The site was originally recorded by the Jesuits as Acheulean but the flint collections were later found to be of much later date. It comprised a full range of Heavy Neolithic material with oval, almond shaped and rectangular axes, trapezoidal and rectangular chisels, thick discoid, side and end scrapers on large blades, picks and burins and a full range of cores. The industry is characterized by large, round, flat bifaces that were noted by Fleisch to have similarities to those found at Douwara and various other sites. The material from this site was in a pale, smooth, grey-cream chert that had patinated and is now held at the Museum of Lebanese Prehistory at Saint Joseph University. The Cauvins suggested the material had similarities to the Neolithic moyen assemblage from Byblos and Andrew Moore theorized that Heavy Neolithic stations such as this were used during earlier and later periods. James Mellaart suggested the Heavy Neolithic industry of the culture dated to a period before the Pottery Neolithic at Byblos (10600 to 6900 BCE according to the ASPRO chronology).

== Qaraoun III (Ain el Barde) ==
Qaraoun III is 300 m northwest of the village, on the left bank of the river near the track going south towards Joub Jannine at the edge of the Sahel Qaraoun plain. It was discovered and materials collected by Jacques Cauvin who suggested they were Acheulean. The bi-facial pieces recovered were of exceptional high quality with various forms showing a great level of skill and workmanship. They are now held by the Museum of Lebanese Prehistory at Saint Joseph University. The site was wiped from the face of the map by the waters of the Qaraoun lake which formed after the construction of the El Waraoun dam.1

Henri Fleisch remarked in a personal communication with Lorraine Copeland that several other prehistoric sites exist in the same area, but with smaller amounts of material.

In February 2003, heavy rainfall in the southern Beqaa Valley raised the water level of the Litani river around lake Qaraoun and caused further damage to the sites close to the banks. Maya Haïdar Boustani has indicated that urgent archaeological fieldwork is required to investigate and protect the condition of the archaeological sites concerned.
