= Aammiq Wetland =

Wetland in Lebanon

Coordinates: 33°43′53.15″N 35°47′20.34″E

Designations

Ramsar Wetland
- Official name: Ammiq Wetland
- Designated: 16 April 1999
- Reference no.: 978

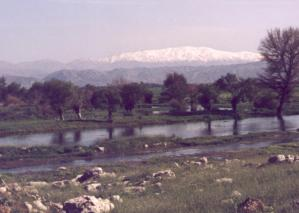
Ammiq wetlands

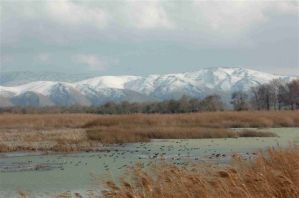
The wetlands in winter

The Aammiq Wetland (the name is also sometimes transliterated as "Ammiq"or "Aamiq") is the largest remaining freshwater wetland in Lebanon, a remnant of much more extensive marshes and lakes that once existed in the Bekaa Valley. It has been designated an Important Bird Area in the Middle East (BirdLife International, 1994), is included in the Directory of Wetlands in the Middle East (IUCN, 1995), was declared Ramsar Convention site number 978 in 1999, and most recently (2005) was designated, with Al Shouf Cedar Nature Reserve, a “Biosphere reserve” by UNESCO.

== Description ==
The swamp lies on one of the most important bird migration routes in the world, and over 250 species of birds have been recorded in the area, including the globally vulnerable greater spotted eagle (Aquila clanga), eastern imperial eagle (Aquila heliaca), and lesser kestrel (Falco naumanni). Records of globally near-threatened bird species at the wetland include great snipe (Gallinago media), ferruginous duck (Aythya nyroca) and pallid harrier (Circus macrourus). In addition to the diversity of birds in the area, there are a variety of animals living in and around the marsh. Twenty-three species of mammals have been recorded, including jungle cat (Felis chaus) and European otter (Lutra lutra). Five species of amphibians and twelve species of reptiles have been recorded, and a two-year weekly butterfly survey found fifty-three species of butterflies in the area. The wetland lies 7 km SSW of the city of Qab Elias on the eastern edge of Mount Lebanon. The main area of reedbeds and open pools covers 253 ha, stretching east from the foot of the mountains to the Litani River in a long strip. Rain and snow falling on the high ridge of Barouk mountain to the west provide water for the wetland. Surrounding the open water and reed bed are areas of rough grazing, cultivated land, drainage ditches, and an avenue of trees, all adding to the diversity of habitats in the area. On the nearby mountain slopes, small wooded areas and rocky shrubland give an even greater variety of habitats and species. Behind the nearby village of Aammiq are woods where Syrian woodpecker (Dendrocopus syriacus) and Syrian serin (Serinus syriacus) can be found. In spring and summer, shrubby hillsides are home to assorted buntings, wheatears, warblers and shrikes, and rocky gorges host western rock nuthatch (Sitta neumayer) and Eurasian eagle owl (Bubo bubo). Mammals present include Caucasian squirrel, wildcat, wild boar and the Indian porcupine.

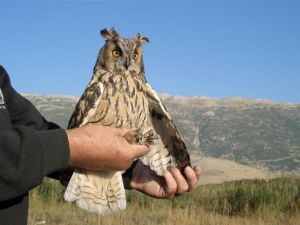
Long-eared owl caught during ringing activity

== Scientific studies ==
Since the founding of A Rocha Lebanon in 1996, scientific studies and short-term research projects on the flora and fauna of Lebanon and in particular the West Bekaa have been carried out, all of which have greatly increased the knowledge of migrating raptors and other birds in Lebanon. Various archaeological studies addressed including pollen core analysis on the site of Aammiq.

== Fauna ==
Mammals: The following descriptions of mammals of the Ammiq wetlands have all been recorded by A Rocha personnel in the Aammiq region from 1997 onwards. The region covered includes not just the valley floor wetlands but also the adjacent farmlands and the slopes of Mount Barouk. One mammal is the European otter Lutra lutra. Water buffalos were introduced to the swamp in order to maintain the health of the vegetation cover and the swamp itself, since buffalo graze wetlands in a more efficient way than other herbivores. The mammals recorded in the region include: southern white-breasted hedgehog (Erinaceus concolor), Cape hare (Lepus capensis), Caucasian squirrel (Sciurus anomalus), Indian porcupine (Hystrix indica), gray wolf (Canis lupus), red fox (Vulpes vulpes), European otter (Lutra lutra), European badger (Meles meles), striped hyena (Hyaena hyaena), mountain gazelle (Gazella gazella), wild boar (Sus scrofa).

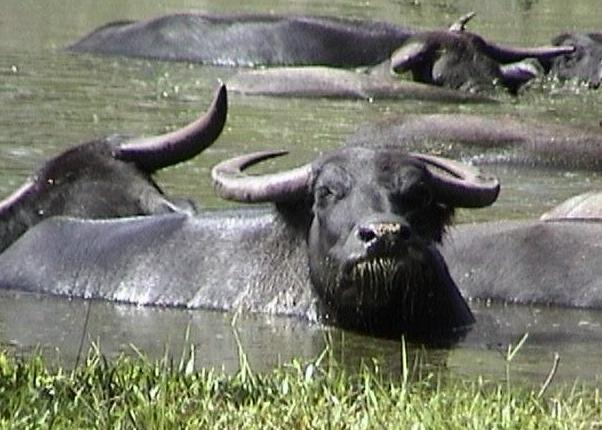
Water buffalo

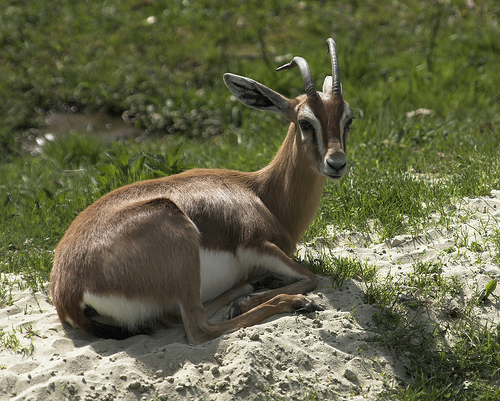
Mountain gazelle

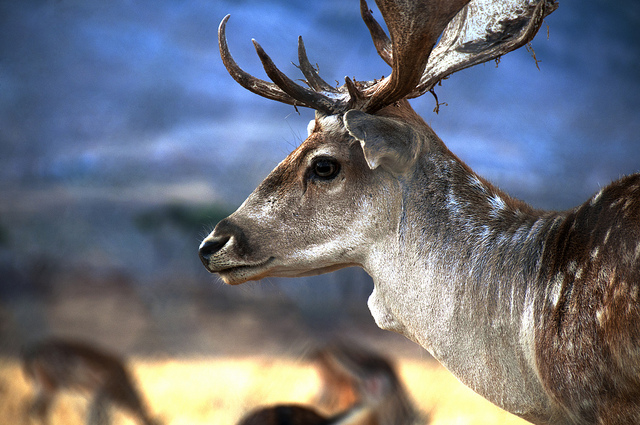
European fallow deer

Birds: Nearly 260 bird species have been recorded in the Aammiq region either by A Rocha personnel or people working with A Rocha from 1996 onwards. The Aammiq region includes not just the valley floor wetlands but also the adjacent farmlands and the sometimes wooded rocky slopes of Mount Barouk. The listing of these birds does not give any idea of their abundance or status. While some of the birds recorded below are residents, others are passage migrants. Some of these, such as the white stork and the lesser spotted eagle, may pass over Aammiq in flocks of hundreds at a time. Other migrants fly over in far smaller numbers. Species include: pygmy cormorant (Phalacrocorax pygmeus), white pelican (Pelecanus onocrotalus), greater flamingo (Phoenicopterus rubber), ferruginous duck (Aythya nyroca), osprey (Pandion haliaetus), Verreaux's eagle (Aquila verreauxii), peregrine falcon (Falco peregrinus), common crane (Grus grus), rock pigeon (Columba livia).

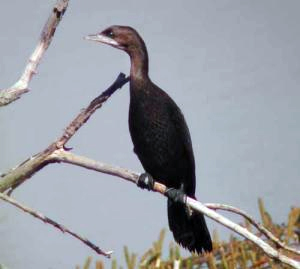
Pygmy cormorant

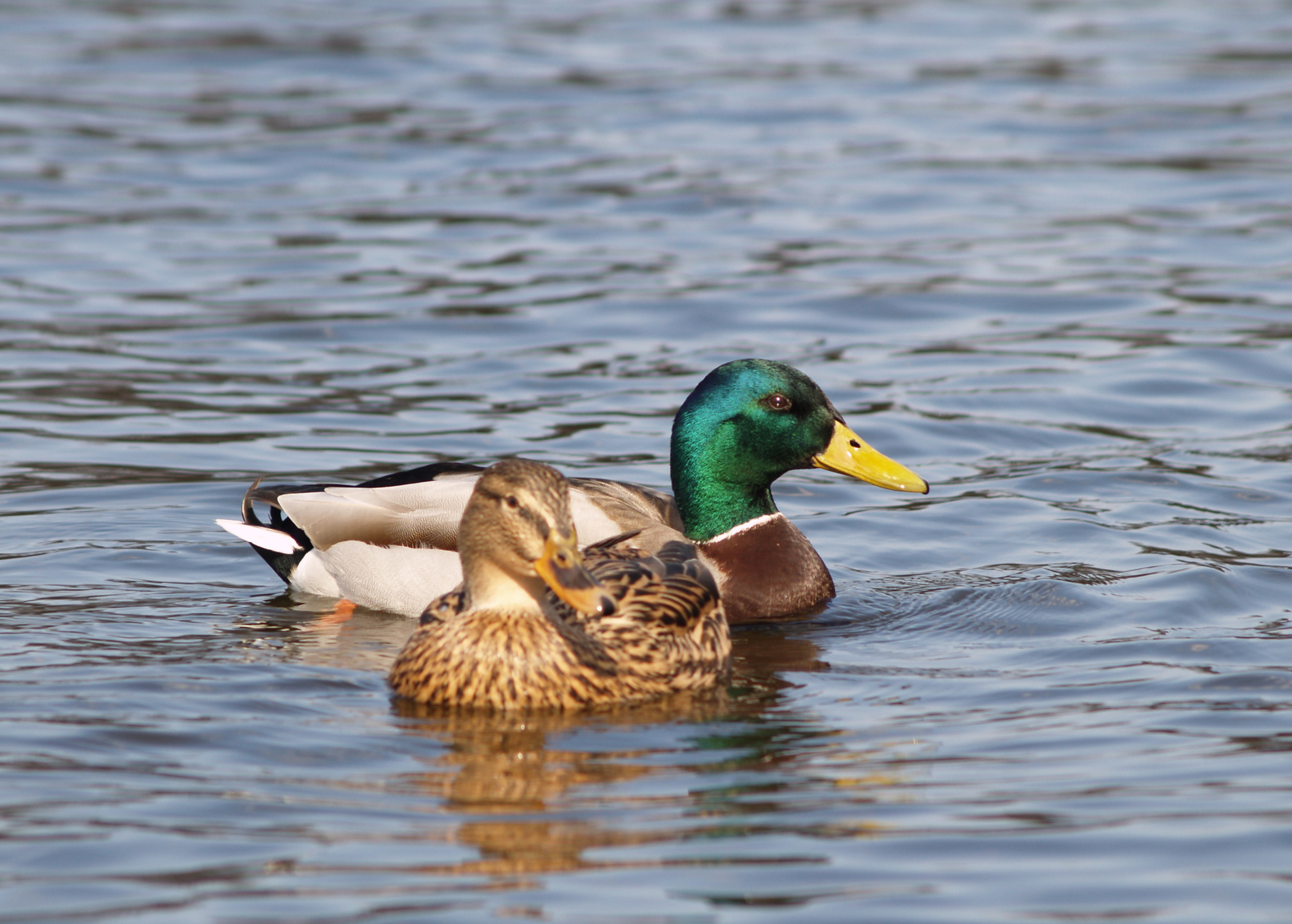
Mallard (male and female)

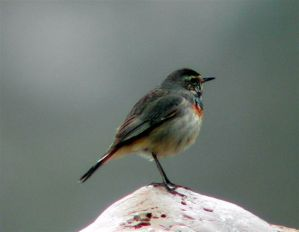
Bluethroat

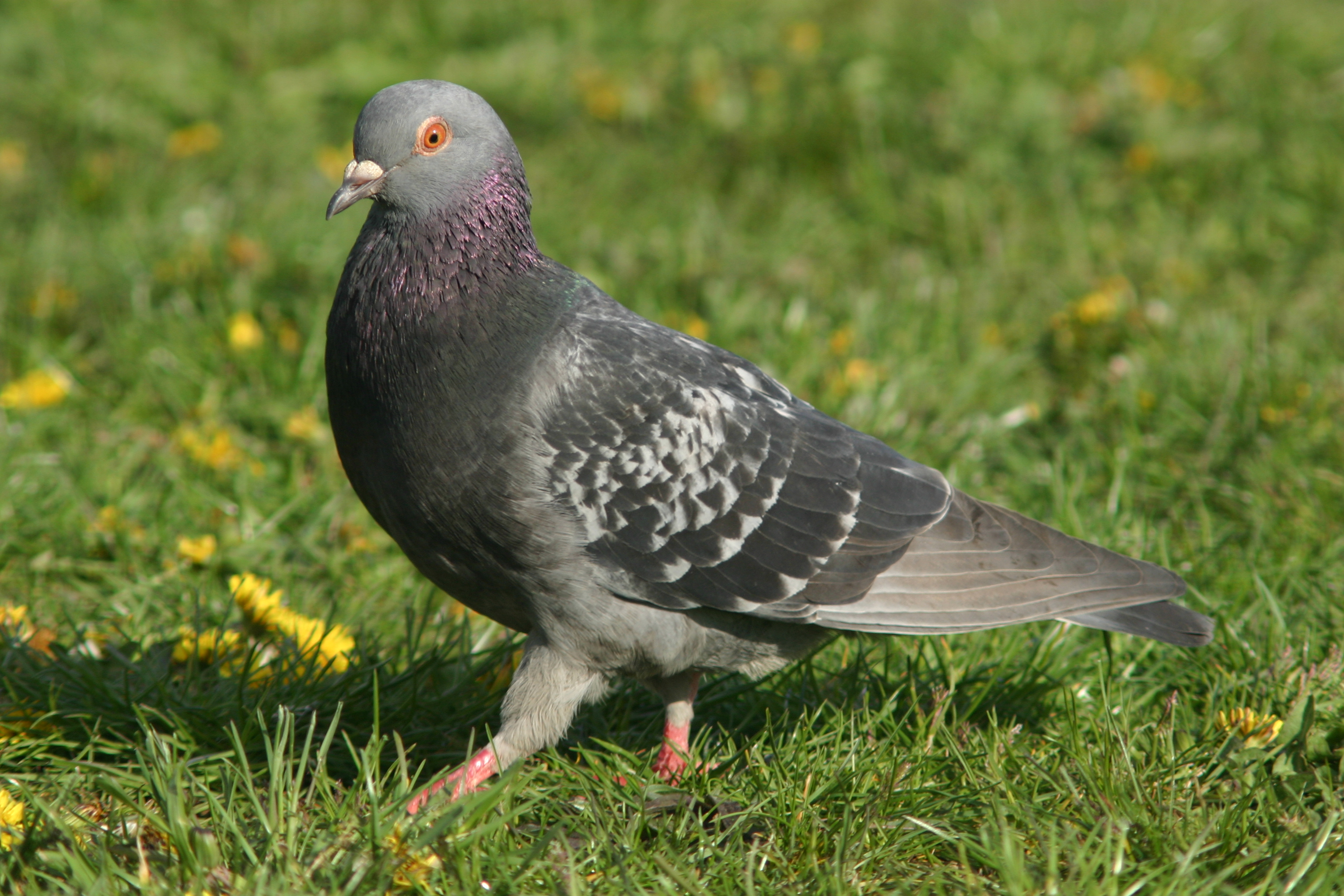
Rock pigeon

Amphibians and reptiles: The amphibians and reptiles listed below have been recorded in the Aammiq region either by A Rocha personnel or people working with A Rocha from 1996 onwards. As with the other species lists, the Aammiq region is here taken to include not just the valley floor wetlands, which are very rich in reptiles, but also the adjacent farmlands and the rocky slopes of Mount Barouk. Herpetology, the study of reptiles and amphibians, is a specialised field and as yet there has been no systematic A Rocha herpetological survey of this area. Far more species are known to exist in the area than the ones reported. Species include: European green toad (Bufo viridis), Levantine frog (Pelophylax bedriagae), Levant green lizard (Lacerta media), European worm snake (Typhlops vermicularis), Levant viper (Macrovipera lebetina).

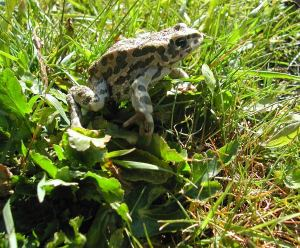
European green toad

Mediterranean tree frog

Moths, butterflies, and dragonflies:

As with many other groups, the moths of the Aammiq region are poorly known. The list below represents an incomplete and provisional list of species so far recorded. A Rocha personnel recorded new records of species since 1998 such as: Oriental marbled skipper (Carcharodus boeticus), swallowtail (Papilio machaon), scarce swallowtail (Iphiclides podalirius), false Apollo (Archon apollinus), large white (Pieris brassicae), plain tiger (Danaus chrysippus), long-tailed blue (Lampides boeticus).

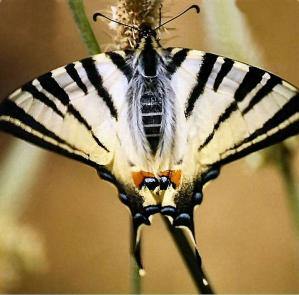
Scarce swallowtail

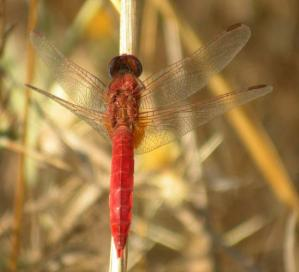
Scarlet dragonfly

Also the Aammiq region has a diversity of dragonflies which can be divided into two groups, the Zygoptera (damselflies) and the Anisoptera (the insects commonly referred to as dragonflies), species include: azure damselfly (Coenagrion puella), blue-tailed damselfly (Ischnura elegans), emperor dragonfly (Anax imperator), southern darter (Sympetrum meridionale), scarlet dragonfly (Crocothemis erythraea).

== Environmental education ==
A Rocha Lebanon has run the environmental education programme at the Aammiq Wetland since 1998.
