= Kefraya =

Kefraya كفريا
- Town
- Location within Lebanon
- Coordinates: 33°40′15″N 35°44′11″E
- Country: Lebanon
- Governorate: Beqaa Governorate
- District: Western Beqaa District
- Founder: Hala Saleh

Government
  - Time Zone: GMT +2 (UTC)
  - - Summer (DST): +3 (UTC)
  - Area Code(s): (+961) 1
- Time zone: UTC+2 (EET)
  - Summer (DST): UTC+3 (EEST)
- Dialing code: +961

Kefraya (Arabic: كفريا / ALA-LC: Kifrayā) is a village in the Western Beqaa District of the Beqaa Governorate in the Republic of Lebanon, approximately 7 kilometres (4.3 mi) northwest of Joub Jannine. The village is predominantly Sunni with a small minority of Greek Catholics and Shia Muslims.

== Château Kefraya ==
It is known for its vineyards and Château Kefraya wines. Château Kefraya is the second biggest winery in the Beqaa Valley with land that extends up to 3,000 acres (12 km^{2}) amongst the foothills of Mount Barouk, 20 kilometres (12 mi) south of the town of Chtaura. It was established in 1951 by its owner Michel de Bustros (Bustros Family). Shares of the winery are owned by Walid Jumblatt. Chateau Kefraya exports wines to a number of countries in America, Europe, Middle East, Asia, Oceania, and Africa.

== Archaeology ==
Kefraya was also once home to the Qaraoun culture with a Heavy Neolithic archaeological industry prior to the Neolithic Revolution. A very large archaeological site was discovered in the area running along both sides of the road. Good quality flint nodules were found amongst Eocene conglomerates where a Heavy Neolithic factory site was detected with a massive abundance of Levallois cores, debitage and waste littering the surface of the site. Large numbers of flint tools were collected by workers that included a variety of scrapers on flakes, knives, axes, adzes and a segmented sickle blade. The type of flint found in the area was termed Kefraya flint.
