= Nachcharini =

Cave in Lebanon

Nachcharini cave
- Location in Lebanon
- 34°4′39″N 36°20′52″E
- Type: Cave
- Periods: PPNA, PPNB, Neolithic
- Cultures: Natufian culture, Khiamian
- Location: Nachcharini Plateau
- Region: Anti-Lebanon Mountains
- Part of: Natufian sites in Lebanon

Site notes
- Material: Limestone
- Excavation dates: 1972, 1974, 2001
- Archaeologists: Bruce Schroeder, Alex Wasse
- Condition: ruins, looted during war
- Public access: Yes

The Nachcharini cave is located at a height of 2,100 m (6,889.76 ft) on the Nachcharini Plateau in the Anti-Lebanon Mountains near the Lebanese/Syrian border and among the most elevated Natufian and Khiamian hunter-gatherer occupation sites found to date.

Moderately sized, but of significance for the study of the Pre-Pottery Neolithic A period in Lebanon, it was excavated in 1972 and 1974 by Bruce Schroeder as part of the University of Toronto's investigation of Paleo-human occupation throughout the Beqaa Valley in the west. Research was discontinued during the Lebanese Civil War. The only radiocarbon date of the Neolithic period from this site has a high deviation rate, falling between 8,500 BC and 7,700 BC. Resumed investigation into the prehistoric land use of this site were carried out in 2001, directed by Alex Wasse of the Council for British Research in the Levant. The team found the site badly looted but was able to recover numerous tools and flints for further study.

Harsh local climate restricted occupation of the site most likely to spring and summer only. Heavy snowfall lasts into spring, which provides water for areal irrigation into June, of some of the historically richest Levantine pastures.

Research suggests, that there are strong elements of continuity between the Natufian (as the last Levantine Epipaleolithic culture) and the PPNA as evidenced by tool comparison. Analysis of chipped stone tools revealed similarities to the Jericho Sultanian style, suggesting more advanced activities than carried out at other PPNA sites. Evidence from Wadi Faynan suggests a variety of non-hunting purposes for these types of tools. Microdrills are a particularly common tool type in the Khiamian period. They were used mainly to perforate stone beads. This can be deduced from the use-wear marks on the active areas and the residue conserved on them.

== Bibliography ==
- Ofer Bar-Yosef, François Raymond Valla: The Natufian culture in the Levant, International Monographs in Prehistory, 1991.
- ^ Borrell, Ferran; Ibáñez, Juan José; Molist, Miquel (January 2014). Stone Tools in Transition: From Hunter-Gatherers to Farming Societies in the Near East. Servei de Publicacions de la Universitat Autònoma de Barcelona. pp. 211–. ISBN 978-84-490-3818-1.
- ^ Alan H. Simmons (15 April 2011). The Neolithic Revolution in the Near East: Transforming the Human Landscape. University of Arizona Press. pp. 118–. ISBN 978-0-8165-0127-4.
- ^ Peter M. M. G. Akkermans; Glenn M. Schwartz (2003). The Archaeology of Syria: From Complex Hunter-Gatherers to Early Urban Societies (c.16,000-300 BC). Cambridge University Press. pp. 33–. ISBN 978-0-521-79666-8.
