= Grattoir de côté =

Upper Paleolithic stone tool

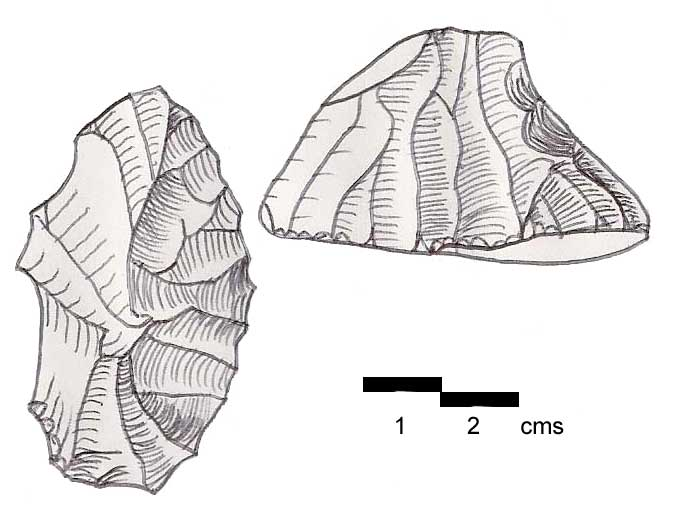
Grattoir de côté. A carinated steep-scraper with a racloir on one of the sides. Found at Jdeideh II, Lebanon. Brown Cretaceous flint

In archaeology, a grattoir de côté (French for side scraper) is a ridged variety of steep-scraper distinguished by a working edge on one side. They were found at various archaeological sites in Lebanon including Ain Cheikh and Jdeideh II and are suggested to date to Upper Paleolithic stages three or four (Levantine Aurignacian).
