= Maurice Tallon =

French Jesuit archaeologist (1906–1982)

Reverend Father Maurice Edouard Tallon (22 October 1906 – 21 July 1982) was a French Jesuit archaeologist notable for his work on prehistory in Lebanon. Born in Mornant, France, he was son of Edouard Tallon and attended Mongre College, (Clermont-Ferrand).
