= Auguste Bergy =

Reverend Father Auguste Bergy (12 May 1873 – 31 August 1955) was a French Jesuit archaeologist known for his work on prehistory in Lebanon.

He is known particularly for excavations and studies at the Sands of Beirut and at Ras Beirut. In 1930 he discovered Tell Arslan, the oldest known neolithic village settlement in the Beirut area.

== Selected bibliography ==
- Bergy, Auguste., Le Paléolithique ancien stratifié à Ras Beyrouth, M.U.S.J, XVI, 169-217, 1932.
