= Industry (archaeology) =

Typological classification of stone tools

Video of the extraction of a stone tool from a silex rock.

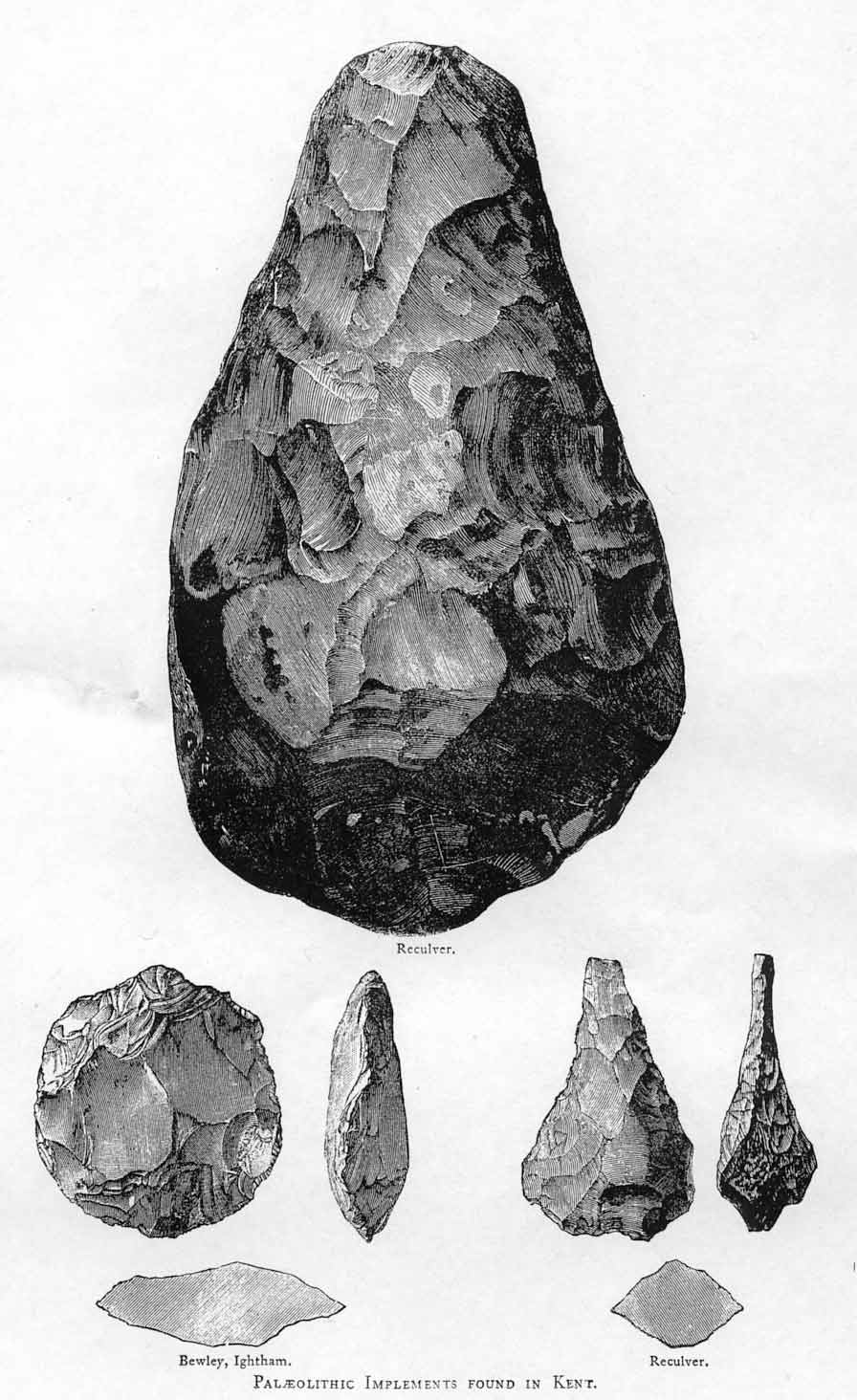
Acheulean handaxes from Kent. The types shown are (clockwise from top) cordate, ficron, and ovate.

In the archaeology of the Stone Age, an industry or technocomplex is a typological classification of stone tools.

An industry consists of a number of lithic assemblages, typically including a range of different types of tools, that are grouped together on the basis of shared technological or morphological characteristics. For example, the Acheulean industry includes hand-axes, cleavers, scrapers and other tools with different forms, but which were all manufactured by the symmetrical reduction of a bifacial core producing large flakes. Industries are usually named after a type site where these characteristics were first observed (e.g. the Mousterian industry is named after the site of Le Moustier). By contrast, Neolithic axeheads from the Langdale axe industry were recognised as a type well before the centre at Great Langdale was identified by finds of debitage and other remains of the production, and confirmed by petrography (geological analysis). The stone was quarried and rough axe heads were produced there, to be more finely worked and polished elsewhere.

As a taxonomic classification of artefacts, industries rank higher than archaeological cultures. Cultures are usually defined from a range of different artefact types and are thought to be related to a distinct cultural tradition. By contrast, industries are defined by basic elements of lithic production which may have been used by many unrelated human groups over tens or even hundreds of thousands of years, and over very wide geographical ranges. Sites producing tools from the Acheulean industry stretch from France to China, as well as Africa. Consequently, shifts between lithic industries are thought to reflect major milestones in human evolution, such as changes in cognitive ability or even the replacement of one human species by another. However, findings from ancient DNA studies describe several changes and periods of stasis in European populations that are not strongly reflected in the current cultural taxonomic frameworks. Therefore, artefacts from a single industry may come from a number of different cultures.

== See also ==
- Archaeological horizon
- Lithic technology
