= Museum of Lebanese Prehistory =

Museum in Beirut, Lebanon

- Musée de Préhistoire Libanaise متحف ما قبل التاريخ اللبناني
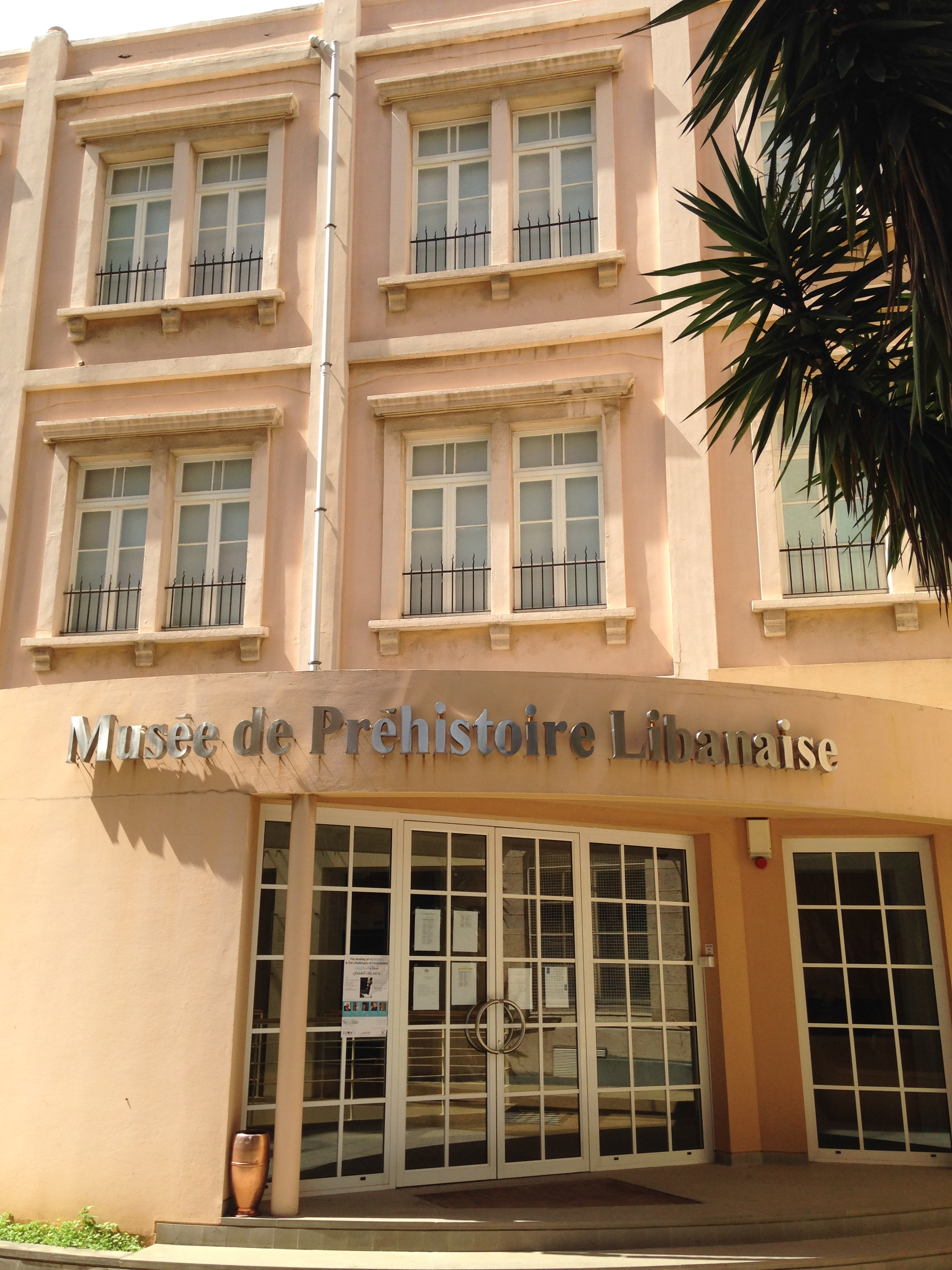

- Location within Beirut Location within Lebanon
- Established: 2000
- Location: Beirut, Lebanon
- Coordinates: 33°53′29.92″N 35°30′29.37″E
- Type: Archaeological
- Director: Maya Haïdar-Boustani
- Curator: Nelly Abboud
- Website: www.usj.edu.lb/mpl/

The Museum of Lebanese Prehistory (French: Musée de Préhistoire Libanaise, Arabic: متحف ما قبل التاريخ اللبناني) is a museum of prehistory and archaeology in Beirut, Lebanon.

== History ==
The museum was opened in June 2000 to commemorate the 125th anniversary of Saint Joseph University of Beirut. The founding of the museum was an outgrowth of the work of Jesuit scholars who carried out much of the prehistoric research in this part of the world until the 1950s. The artifacts in the collection of the Faculty of Arts and Humanities of Saint Joseph University became the basis of the museum. This faculty established a research centre in 1988 that led to the creation of the Museum of Prehistory in June 2000.

== Displays ==
The museum houses a large collection of animal and human bones, Neolithic pottery, stone tools and other ancient items recovered from over four hundred archaeological sites since the 19th century. The collections form a unique reference and were only accessible to specialists until the late 1990s. By exhibiting part of the collection to the public, the university has enabled people to investigate and discover the details and mysteries of prehistoric Lebanon.

The museum occupies a total of 350 square metres (3,800 ft^{2}) on two levels. The upper floor is devoted to tools and the basement displays illustrate the lifestyle of hunter-gatherers. The invention of agriculture and the domestication of animals are key themes and the museum includes 35 display boards and 22 windows exhibiting different fossils and flint tools from the Stone Age. These include early agricultural tools, blades, sickles, a pick, an axe and millstone. Dioramas and recreated artifacts are presented together in thematic arrangements and in some cases compare and relate modern tools to Stone Age counterparts making the artefacts easier to understand. Displays cover three areas: tools, hunting and the invention of agriculture. Visitors are invited to discover how and why flint tools were made and what purpose they served. Rare bone tools and an antler from the Antelias Cave, Sands of Beirut illustrate the ingenuity of the prehistoric people who inhabited Lebanon. Hunting is illustrated in various panels with reconstructions of weapons like the spear and arrows along with elements of well-preserved fauna from sites explored by the Jesuit Fathers. The invention of agriculture was one of the most important milestones in the history of mankind achieved in the Middle East. A special area of the display highlights the various stages from plowing up to production of bread, a transition accessible to all audiences. A French and Arabic documentary presentation entitled Lebanon in Prehistory can be viewed by visitors.

== Exhibitions ==
The museum hosts a range of conferences and exhibitions including "The Heritage of Darwin", "The Paintings of Frédéric Husseini" and "Aquatic Fossils from Lebanon". To celebrate its 10th anniversary, the museum presented an exhibition entitled Prehistory vs Urbanization devoted to one of its founders, Henri Fleisch. Fleisch compiled a photographic archive of the devastation caused by excessive urbanization of Lebanon for nearly 60 years. The single showroom exhibition gave a dissection of the scene showing sites such as Tripoli, Byblos, Tabarja, the bay of Jounieh, Antelias and memorable caves, Ras Beirut and Naam. Thousands of images and freezes were taken of the Lebanese coastline, mountains and the Beqaa Valley showing sites that were inhabited by bipedal hominids for nearly a million years before the appearance of the Phoenicians. A central theme of the exhibition was urbanization as "a disaster inflicted on the Prehistory" and the upheavals of the Lebanese landscape. This destruction is shown in the Fleisch's photographs which document the disappearance of the Sands of Beirut, a complex of nearly 20 rich, prehistoric sites that were completely destroyed due to operations to use the soft sandstone for buildings.

Lévon Nordigiuan, the museum director said

The work carried out on large urban sites will slow if not stop prehistoric research, even though Lebanon is at this time, one of the most developed Arab countries in this area ... historians can only feel deep sorrow at the disaster inflicted on the prehistory of the Sands of Beirut, the Sands are gone.

The exhibition was filled with similar photographic examples. The Antelias Cave with many Paleolithic vestiges was demolished by workers in the 1960s. Naama showed three Paleolithic habitats with numerous animal bones and disappeared in favor of the southern highway. Last-minute intervention of Fleisch saved many essential pieces for scientific research. Other sites, like the shelter of Ksar Akil in the valley of Antelias are still at risk. Transformations reported by the photographs are not always obvious to understand for the untrained eye.

Maya Haïdar Boustani, the museum curator stated

The photographs are black and white and the places he chooses are not easy to visualize. The difficulty for us was to make pictures talk to the general public so they measure the extent of damage.

To provide a comparison point for visitors, photographs of the locations were taken showing changes over 60 years and the verdict was clear and without surprises; urbanization has become rampant. Comparative photos, in color this time, depict a coastline taken over with holiday resorts and mountains denatured by residential cement mixers.

== Projects ==
The museum has been involved in various archaeological research and recovery projects in Lebanon and Syria. In 2001, an exploration project was carried out in the Anti-Lebanon mountains in partnership with the Directorate General of Antiquities and the Council for British Research in the Levant. From July 14 to August 10, 2001, an international team led by Alexander Wasse (Council for British Research in the Levant) conducted a field campaign. Its objectives were to locate and specify the GPS location of sites already discovered by Bruce Schroeder, to carry out an intensive survey of the plateau and wadi of Nachcharini Atneine, to study the environmental context in order to get an idea of the prehistoric occupation of the area and assess the conservation status of the Nachcharini cave for possible excavation. Of the 23 prehistoric sites originally discovered by Bruce Schroeder, 19 were located, including Nachcharini and 39 other new sites were inventoried. According to the lithic material collected, the periods documented include the Middle Paleolithic, the Epipaleolithic, the Pre-Pottery Neolithic A, the Pre-Pottery Neolithic B and Chalcolithic or Early Bronze Age. The diagnosis of pottery sherds collected on the surface showed several periods of occupation.

In 2004, the museum embarked on a project of surveys in Syria's (Homs District). The project was a partnership of the Directorate General of Antiquities and Museums in Syria, the Mila and Fontanals Institution of the Higher Council for Scientific Research (Barcelona) and the International Institute for Prehistoric Research in the University of Cantabria (Santander). Scientific direction was carried out jointly by Dr. Michel Al-Maqdisi (Directorate of Antiquities and Museums of Syria), Dr. Maya Haïdar-Boustani (Museum Lebanese Prehistory, LSU) and Dr. Juan José Ibañez (Mila and Fontanals Institution). The area of the survey is located in western Syria, totaling approximately 560 kilometres (350 mi). This region includes clearly differentiated areas in the valley of the Orontes River, the basaltic plateaus, hills and plains of Bouqaia. The aim of the mission is not only to inventory and document all sites from the Paleolithic to the Ottoman period, but specifically to locate sites that mark the beginning of the Neolithic and later those of Early Bronze Age lying between the south of Aleppo and the Beqaa Valley, forming a vast region that connects the middle Euphrates to the Jordan Valley. The second area of research concerns the period of the mid 3rd millennium, including surveys to find sites on the caravan route between Tell Jamous in the west and Tell Nebi Mend to the east. The location of archaeological sites is based on analysis of satellite images (Corona and Google Earth), the study of the topographical maps, aerial photography, geophysical and population surveys. 167 archaeological sites were found from all periods, reflecting the rich heritage of this region. The major contribution of the work was the discovery of Natufian and megalithic tombs attested in two sites: Jeftelik and Wadi Chbat, the first Natufian sites inventoried and documented in this area. The Neolithic and perhaps even the final PPNB pottery was documented on a few important sites such as Tell al-Marj, which has strong parallels with Byblos. Megalithic sites are a spectacular phenomenon, often equipped with tumuli and burial vaults. These structures are sometimes grouped in small numbers, as on the tops of hills in the basaltic area, but sometimes they form a vast necropolis such as the basalt plains north of Lake Qattina. The presence of monoliths, and side walls of the tumuli suggests the existence of complex, Bronze Age, ritual structures similar to those of Menger in northern Lebanon and those of southern Syria.

== Visitor information ==
The museum opening hours are between 0900 and 1500 on Tuesdays, Wednesdays, Fridays and Saturdays. The museum is closed on public holidays and during university holidays. Tours last approximately 1 hour, including a 15-minute film documentary, the first of its kind and a valuable complement to the museum visit, broadcast in French or Arabic. Group tours and school visits can be made by appointment.

== See also ==
- Archaeology of Lebanon
- List of museums in Lebanon
