= Henri Fleisch =

French archaeologist, missionary and orientalist (1904–1985)

Reverend Father Henri Fleisch (1 January 1904 – 10 February 1985) was a French archaeologist, missionary and Orientalist, known for his work on classical Arabic language and Lebanese dialect and prehistory in Lebanon. Fleisch spent years recording and recovering lithics from prehistoric Lebanese archaeological sites and in 1954, it was confirmed that he had discovered and named a previously unknown proto-Neolithic culture in Lebanon called the Qaraoun culture that used a flint industry he termed Heavy Neolithic.

Fleisch was born in Jonvelle (Haute-Saône), France. He entered the Society of Jesus in Lyon Fourvière in September 1921 and was ordained a Catholic priest on 24 August 1933, he celebrated his first mass at Jonvelle on 27 August. Fleisch was largely self-taught, specialising in oriental studies, for which he earned a doctorate at the Sorbonne in May 1943 with a thesis published on "Work and Memoirs of the Institute of Ethnology in Paris". He made many trips abroad and settled in Lebanon, where he discovered in Bikfaya in 1923–1926. He did his military service in Syria and was injured during a confrontation. Mobilized in 1939, he was taken prisoner on 19 June 1940 and held at Stalag XII, from where he was released in February 1941. From August 1945 he taught at the "Institut des Lettres Orientales" of Saint Joseph University in Beirut. It was here that many of his archaeological finds were stored and in 2000 they formed The Museum of Lebanese Prehistory where many of his finds are stored and displayed. The museum celebrated their tenth anniversary with a posthumous exhibition of Fleisch's photography and work entitled "Prehistory vs. Urbanization". He died, aged 81, in Lebanon, where he was buried.

He was the author of two hundred forty publications, including the Eastern dialects and was a specialist in Arabic, Greek, Latin, Syriac and Hebrew. He also wrote a small booklet on the French regional patois vocabulary of Jonvelle in 1951. He was the author of the Treaty of Arabic philology in 1961 and 1977. He distinguished himself by combining research prehistory and geology, discovering the site of Naama and carrying out work at Tell Jisr and Ras Beyrouth. Fleisch's most famous works are Introduction à l'Étude des langues sémitiques (1947), L'Arabe classique (1968) and Traité de philologie arabe, 1-2 (1961–79).
