= Qaraoun culture =

Archaeological culture in Lebanon

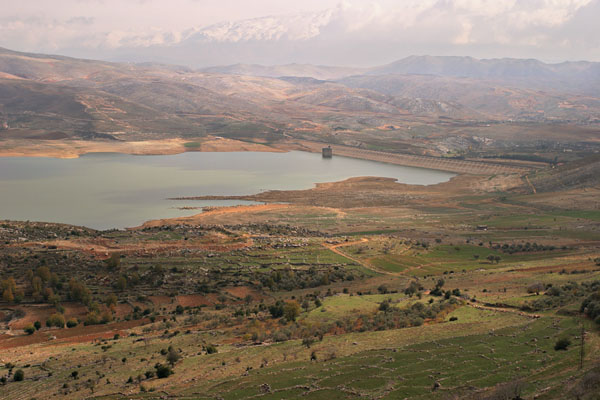
Lake Qaraoun, ancient home of the Qaraoun culture.

Heavy Neolithic tool of the Qaraoun culture found at Mtaileb I - Thick and heavy biface, retouched all over with jagged and irregular edges. Light grey and streaky silicious limestone.

The Qaraoun culture is a culture of the Lebanese Stone Age around Qaraoun in the Beqaa Valley. The Gigantolithic or Heavy Neolithic flint tool industry of this culture was recognized as a particular Neolithic variant of the Lebanese highlands by Henri Fleisch, who collected over one hundred flint tools within two hours on 2 September 1954 from the site. Fleisch discussed the discoveries with Alfred Rust and Dorothy Garrod, who confirmed the culture to have Neolithic elements. Garrod said that the Qaraoun culture "in the absence of all stratigraphical evidence may be regarded as mesolithic or proto-neolithic". (5,000 to 20,000 years Before Present ).
