= War of Brothers =

Fighting between the Amal Movement and Hezbollah

War of Brothers حرب الإخوة
- Part of the Lebanese Civil War
| Date | April 1988 – November 1990 |
| Location | Southern Lebanon, Beqaa Valley and Beirut (Mainly in Dahieh) |
| Result | Inconclusive: Later reconciliation between the two parties |

Belligerents
| Amal Movement: Lebanese Resistance Regiments; Supported by: Syria | Hezbollah: Lebanese Islamic Resistance; Supported by: Iran |

Commanders and leaders
| Nabih Berri | Subhi al-Tufayli |

Strength
| 16,000 fighters (only a few engaged) | 8,000 fighters (only a few engaged) |

Casualties and losses
- Between 500 and 750 dead: 2000+ Amal fighters wounded; 1000+ Hezbollah fighters wounded

The War of Brothers (Arabic: حرب الإخوة, romanized: Ḥarb al-ʾIkhwat) (Note: Alternate names include the Brothers-Enemies War (Arabic: حرب الإخوة الْأَعْدَاءَ, romanized: Ḥarb al-ʾIkhwat al-ʾAʿdāʾ) and the War of the Two Brothers (Arabic: حرب الشقيقين, romanized: Ḥarb ash-Shaqīqayn).) was a period of violent armed clashes between rivals Amal and Hezbollah, Lebanon's main Shiite militia movements, during the final stages of the Lebanese Civil War. The fighting broke out in April 1988 and proceeded intermittently in three phases over the following years until the signing of an agreement brokered by their respective foreign backers, Ba'athist Syria and Iran, in November 1990.

The Amal Movement was formed in 1974 as the armed wing of popular Shiite cleric Musa al-Sadr's Movement of the Dispossessed. Amal supported the intervening Syrian army against the Palestine Liberation Organization (PLO). Hezbollah, on the other hand, which began as an umbrella organization consisting of more conservative elements of Lebanon's Shiite community, was born in 1982 in reaction to Israel's invasion and occupation of South Lebanon. As the Amal-initiated "War of the Camps" against the PLO ended, Hezbollah and its rival Amal began clashing in South Lebanon and in Beirut's southern suburbs.

== Background ==
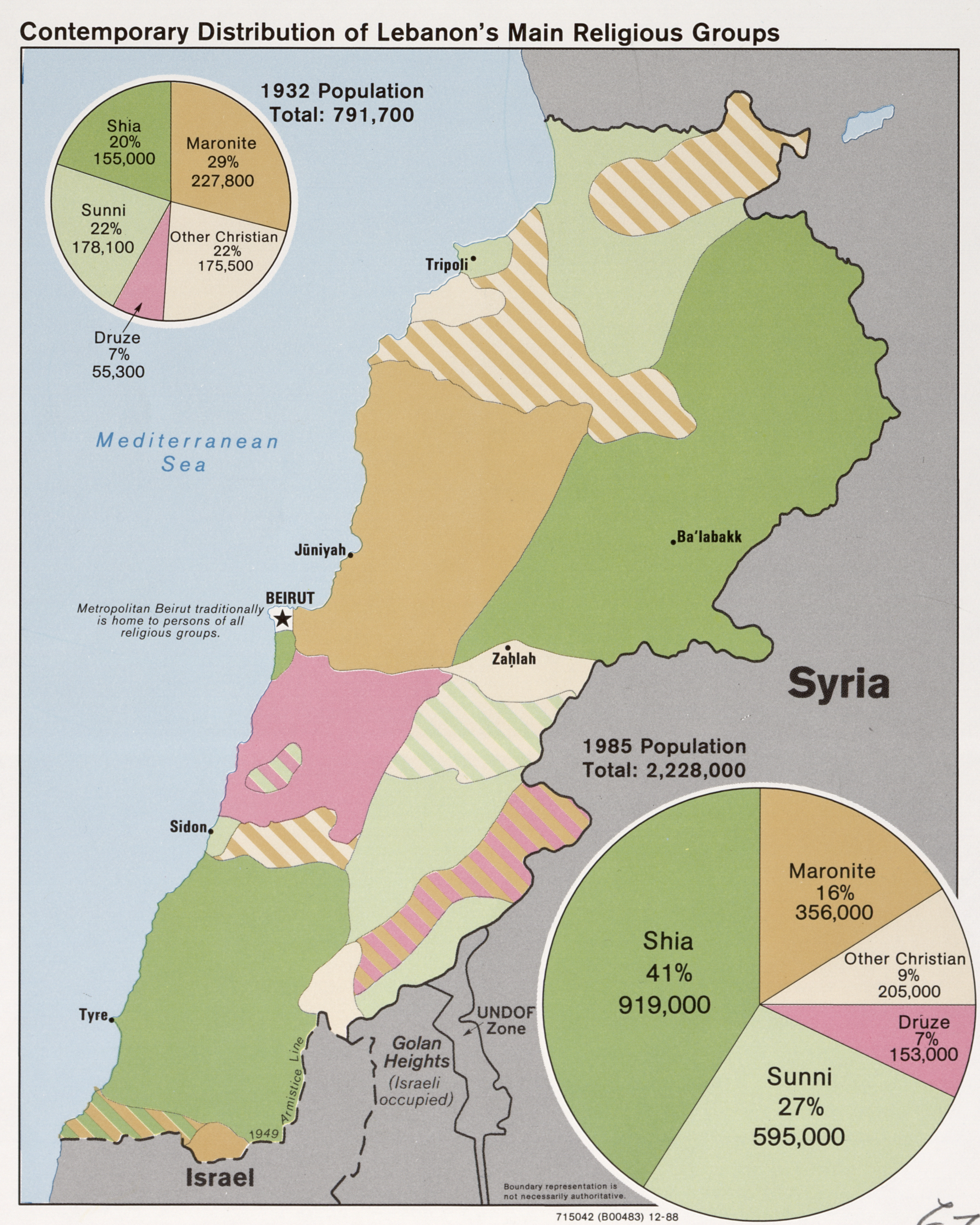
The distribution of the Shia population in Lebanon.

The French mandate in Lebanon was carved out of the region of Syria in 1920, aiming to provide Mount Lebanon's Maronite Christians the basis for an independent state of their own. But due to the Christians' limited geographic distribution, the mandate was including Muslims' lands as well, which only contributed to the complication of the political situation. The situation gradually became better over the years, however, as the Shiites were officially recognized as a sect and granted the right to celebrate Ashura.

As the economic situation began to improve in the 1950s, the Shiites, many of whom had relocated to urban areas, started seeking political representation. Musa al-Sadr, an Iranian-Lebanese cleric who arrived in Lebanon in 1959 to occupy the position of Tyre's leading imam, sought to further his community's interests by promoting and strengthening a certain 'Shiite identity' that is consistent with the broader Lebanese identity. Before Sadr's founding of the Movement of the Dispossessed (Harakat al-Mahrumin) in 1974 and the Supreme Islamic Shiite Council before it, the Shiites, who long felt disenfranchised in the political spectrum, tended to join ranks with a variety of available sociopolitical movements, among which were the Lebanese Communist Party, as well as Nasserist, Ba'athist and even Palestinian movements. The Movement of the Dispossessed became increasingly popular among the middle class Shiites and Lebanese returnees from West Africa, as well as some progressive elements within the influential za'im system. (Note: The majority of the zu'ama, however, felt challenged by Sadr's ideology, which was shifting the Shiites away from their influence. Kamel Asaad, a powerful za'im in the south, as well as the Khalil family of Tyre, were two of Sadr's prominent opponents then.) Sadr's promotion of the idea of social solidarity among Shiites which, coupled with the narrative of "resistance" to Israel, were particularly appealing to his community and contributed to the growth of his movement.

=== Civil War and rise of Hezbollah ===
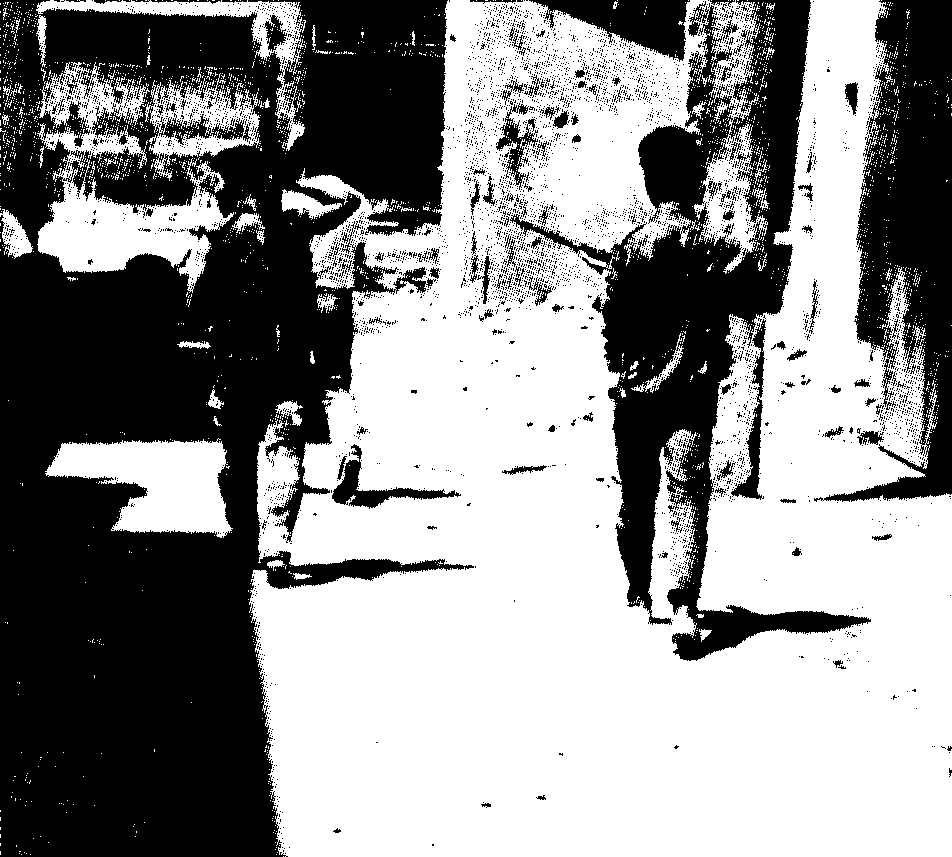
Armed Hezbollah fighters patrol a neighborhood in southern Beirut, 1980s.

Sadr initially advocated for non-violence during the early stages of the Lebanese Civil War, (Note: He went on a much publicized hunger strike at a Beirut mosque to protest the early clashes of the civil war. This earned him the admiration of both Shiites and non-Shiites. And although he supported the Palestinians by the early stages of the conflict, during which the Amal militia was primarily dedicated to protecting the Shiite community of Beirut, Sadr and his movement favored a more neutral and non-confrontational approach when it came to their Christian rivals.) but when an explosion took place at a training camp in the Beqaa Valley, he acknowledged, in July 1975, (Note: In July 1975, a PLO officer, while instructing Shiite militants on the use of explosives in a training camp established by Amal, accidentally detonated a device which killed up to thirty Amal members. Because of the secretive nature of the Amal-PLO training program, Sadr was forced to admit the existence of the militia. This came out as a surprise to many Lebanese observers, and as an embarrassment to Sadr who had recently ended his hunger strike.) the existence of "Amal" (Arabic acronym for "Lebanese Resistance Brigades") as the military wing of the Movement of the Dispossessed. Amal grew rapidly in size, though with an increasingly weaker central command. (Note: In 1978, many fighters, who never went through Amal's official recruitment process, self-organized into local militias, claiming the defense of certain pieces of land in the name of Amal. The movement's leadership did not interfere.) This, in addition to the growing military presence of the Palestine Liberation Organization (PLO) in Shiite lands in the south and its use of methods like torture, increased tension between the two parties. At first, the Shiites, particularly the ones living in the south, were generally supportive of the PLO, (Note: Clashes, however, did occasionally occur between Shiite elements and the PLO upon the eruption of civil war in 1975, and intensified as the conflict progressed.) to which Amal was originally allied. But relations between the PLO and Amal were further strained by the latter's decision to support the Syrian intervention of 1976 against the Lebanese National Movement-PLO coalition. Sadr also drew criticism from within the Shiite community when, later in 1976, he struck a deal with Maronite Phalangist forces besieging the al-Nabaa district of Beirut, allowing the relocation of 100,000 Shiites, among whom were Mohammad Hussein Fadlallah, (Note: Sadr and Fadlallah were both students of the Iranian Najaf-based marja', Abu al-Qasim al-Khoei. Khoei, who became one of Sadr's critics, later appointed Fadlallah as his representative in Lebanon. Amal's deal with the Phalangists furthered tension in the relationship between Sadr and Fadlallah.) from the neighborhood to Jabal Amel and the Beqaa. When Israel launched Operation Litani in 1978 against the PLO in South Lebanon, disproportionate damage was inflicted upon the Shiite community, as it was caught in the crossfire. Sadr himself criticized the PLO for provoking the conflict, and supporters of Amal shifted to blaming the Palestinians for their community's plight. Violent clashes between Amal and the various Palestinian factions operating in the country became more frequent between 1978 and the Israeli invasion of 1982. The IDF operation, which eventually succeeded in routing the PLO out of Lebanon, was welcomed by a portion of the southern Shiite community, given that it aimed to destroy their Palestinian foes.

Musa al-Sadr's unsolved disappearance in 1978 during a trip to Libya, following the Litani operation, led to a struggle for influence among the Shiites, and left Amal's leadership divided along moderate and extremist lines. The Iranian Revolution of 1979 had an equally significant impact on the Shiites of Lebanon, which later managed, through Hezbollah, to indoctrinate the community at the expense of Amal's internal schisms. Hezbollah originated from a Syrian–Iranian deal that allowed Tehran to deploy a 1,500-member Revolutionary Guards (IRGC) delegation in the form of religious scholars and military officials. The Syrian government's concern by the possibility of Israeli influence among the Shiites of the south (Note: One of the Syrian government's longstanding concerns when it came to its Lebanon policy was its fear of a potential Israeli-Lebanese agreement that would compromise its interests in Lebanon and would further isolate it on a regional scale.) in the wake of the 1982 IDF invasion motivated its decision to allow the IRGC delegation to operate freely in the country, despite Syrian wariness of the prospect of Iran's clerical entrenchment in Lebanon. Hussein al-Musawi, one of Amal's leading members, split from the movement in June 1982 to form Islamic Amal. Two months later, Iran's revolutionary leader, Ayatollah Khomeini, met with a number of prominent Lebanese Shiite figures in Tehran, including Fadlallah and Subhi al-Tufayli, who would later become Hezbollah's first secretary-general, among several others. (Note: Ideological differences between Khomeini's doctrine and that of Amal's Nabih Berri made it harder for Iran's new clerical regime to use Amal as a platform from which it could export the Islamic Revolution to Lebanon. Sadr was committed to a Shiite identity that is consistent with Lebanese nationalism and advocated for stronger Lebanese state and military presence in the south, a position later reiterated by Sadr's successors, Hussein el-Husseini and Berri. Iran and Hezbollah, on the other hand, promoted a pan-Islamic revolutionary ideology that is transnational and not confined to specific countries' borders.) During this conference, Khomeini encouraged his guests to form a resistance movement against Israel in South Lebanon. Meanwhile, the IRGC delegation, stationed in the Beqaa Valley, (Note: Namely in Brital, Nabisheet and Baalbek. The Beqaa region is where many Shiite militant clerics and activists had taken up residence in 1982.) helped form the nucleus of Hezbollah's leadership after a recruitment campaign that managed to gather several Lebanese clerics in its ranks. At the same time, the military wing of this movement grew rapidly as a result of extensive Iranian funding and training. Among the constituent groups of Hezbollah were the Muslim Student Union and the Lebanese branch of the Islamic Dawa Party of Iraq, both of which Fadlallah helped create, as well as Hussein al-Musawi's Islamic Amal.

=== Lead-up to war ===
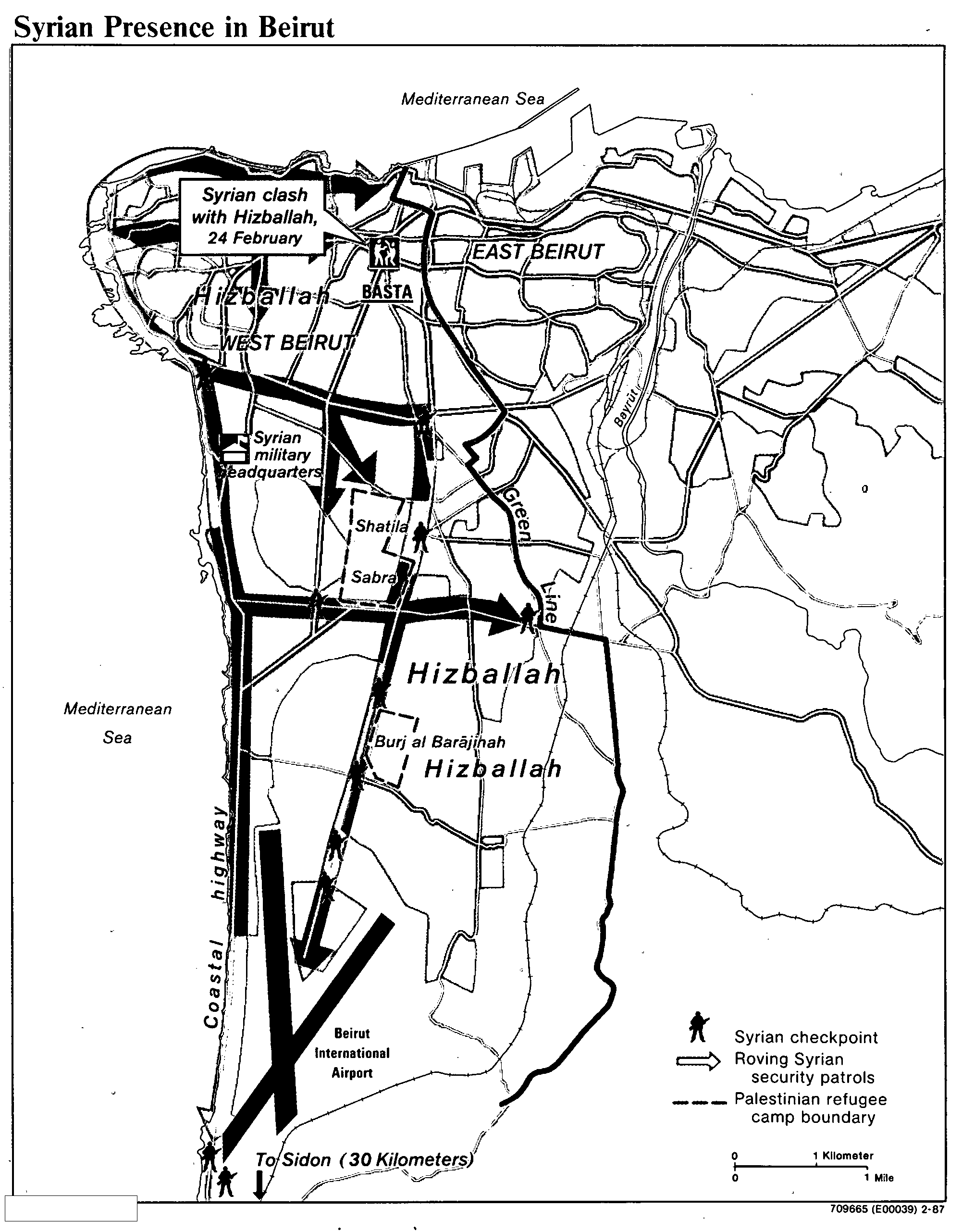
Map of Hezbollah and Syrian control of Beirut in 1987.

Hezbollah originally devoted itself to overthrowing the Lebanese government and establishing a Faqihi Islamic Republic in the image of Iran and resisting the presence of Israeli troops and the Multinational Force in Lebanon (MNF) in the country, as illustrated later by the "Open Letter", a constitutional document which it released in February 1985. The organization is widely credited with a series of attacks sponsored by Iran in the early 1980s, not long after which the MNF ceased to exist. Such incidents include the 1983 suicide bombings in Beirut which struck separate buildings housing MNF troops, killing 241 American soldiers and 58 French paratroopers. The movement also engaged in a series of kidnappings of foreigners and assassinations of politicians throughout the civil war. Given the criticism Syria has received for its links to Hezbollah, the latter's tactics were badly received by both the Syrian government and Amal, who had been working toward achieving favorable perception by world media and the United States. Hafez al-Assad, Syria's president, warned that he would expel the IRGC from Lebanon following Hezbollah's kidnapping of David S. Dodge, the acting president of the American University of Beirut. Amal's leader, Nabih Berri, became the target of multiple Iranian-backed assassination attempts perpetrated by Hezbollah and other pro-Khomeini elements in Lebanon. Assad's threat to the IRGC was materialized when he expelled 300 of its recruits from Baalbek following a complaint by Berri to the Syrian government over the attempts on his life. The hijacking of TWA Flight 847 from Athens to Rome in 1985 by Hezbollah, which was forced to land in the Amal-controlled Beirut International Airport, initially embarrassed Berri and Syria, and further added to the tension between the Syrian and Iranian camps. Hezbollah opposed the Syrian-brokered Tripartite Accord later that year, (Note: The Tripartite Accord was an attempt by Syria to end the civil war, and to emphasize its special relationship with Lebanon. The agreement included Berri of the Shiite Amal, Walid Jumblatt of the Druze Progressive Socialist Party and Elie Hobeika of the Christian Lebanese Forces (LF), three of Lebanon's most powerful militias at the time. Hezbollah's opposition was due to the inclusion of the LF, whose members it perceived as "Israeli agents", though its rejection of the accord was merely political.) and supported the PLO during the War of the Camps, which was launched by Amal, with Syrian support, in order to curb the resurgence of Yasser Arafat's PLO in Lebanon. (Note: Arafat took advantage of the IDF's withdrawal to the "security zone" in 1985, and sought to re-establish the PLO in Lebanon.) Hezbollah considered this sort of inter-Muslim fighting a distraction from the resistance to Israel, and Iran was keen to lift Amal's siege on the Palestinian camps, publicly denouncing its actions as beneficial to the Israelis, against whom it sought to create a Shiite-Palestinian coalition.

On its part, Amal was not only concerned because Palestinian fighters in Lebanon were increasing in number, but also because their camps were geographically located between its strongholds in West Beirut and Hezbollah-controlled Shiite districts in the city, where the latter was gaining influence at Amal's expense. Violent skirmishes between Amal and Hezbollah were rare, but limited clashes did, however, break out twice in 1986 during the War of the Camps. In February, Amal, backed by the Shiite Sixth Brigade of the Lebanese Army, fought Hezbollah in Beirut. They clashed once again in September, and this time the violence reportedly ended with a ceasefire, following an Iranian diplomatic intervention. Another confrontation took place in 1987, when over 2,500 Hezbollah supporters attempted a march on Tyre in the south. They retreated when Amal mobilized its men to block the move. The standoff was accompanied by a large demonstration in the city in which thousands of Shiites rallied in support of Amal. On 22 February 1987, spurred by the kidnapping of Terry Waite, attributed to Hezbollah, and the defeat of the Syrian allied Amal Militia in a week of fighting with the Druze and Communist militias, the Syrian Army deployed 7,000 commandos into West Beirut. On February 24, 1987, an incident occurred at the Fathallah barracks in which 23 Hezbollah militiamen were executed by the Syrians. Hezbollah fighters were placed on high alert following the massacre, while the movement's top leadership condemned it and demanded an apology. Following intense pressure from Iran the Syrians agreed to stop further activity against Hizbollah.

== Events ==
On February 17, 1988, while on his way back from a meeting with a local Amal official, American colonel William R. Higgins, (Note: Higgins was later tortured and murdered by his captors. His death was confirmed in July 1990, when the perpetrators released a video showing his body.) who was heading a United Nations observers' mission, was captured by Hezbollah men on a coastal road in South Lebanon. Earlier this month, they also kidnapped, but eventually released, two UNRWA workers in an area controlled by Amal near Sidon. Nabih Berri considered Hezbollah's actions a territorial breach, and ordered an extensive search and rescue operation in Iqlim al-Tuffah following the Higgins incident. Hezbollah, while backing his captors' demands, denied any responsibility for the kidnapping. When Amal's operation spread to villages in the region which Hezbollah controlled, carrying out a series of arrests and home to home inspections, the latter responded by killing a Lebanese Army officer associated with Amal, and by attacking an Amal checkpoint on the outskirts of the village of Harouf in the Jabal Amel region.

=== Fighting in Nabatieh and Ghazieh ===
During the early stages of an Amal offensive on April 5, 1988, Hezbollah managed to occupy Nabatieh and the surrounding villages. It seized Amal positions and offices in the town, as well as in Ghazieh. In a counterattack, however, Amal retook Nabatieh. It proceeded to attack Hezbollah militants in Tyre and its surroundings, and took the conflict further south to Siddikine. The fighting had gone uninterrupted, despite mediation attempts by a local imam in Nabatieh. Amal had retaken positions it had lost earlier in the fighting, in addition to the three villages of Jebchit, Doueir and Zawtar, previously considered Hezbollah strongholds. The armed clashes were accompanied by psychological warfare, through which Amal attempted to pressure its rival, with Berri associating his movement's military successes to broad public support. Amal declared victory over "extremism and political kidnapping" by mid-April, announcing an end to Hezbollah's military presence in the south, and expelled a number of its rival's clerics to the Beqaa.

A high-level Iranian delegation headed by Ahmad Jannati, which arrived in Lebanon earlier that month following the outbreak of violence, announced during a press conference on April 22 the creation of a five-member commission to solve the crisis that consisted of himself and representatives from Amal and Hezbollah. The commission, however, failed to convince the two sides to reach an agreement in regards to the presence of the United Nations Interim Force (UNIFIL) in the country and disengagement from Israel, both of which Hezbollah opposed. Days after Jannati's conference, fighting re-erupted, but this time in the Beqaa Valley on April 26, and a Hezbollah fortification in the southern village of Maydoum was raided by Israeli commandos on May 2. This pushed Hezbollah to seek further assistance from the IRGC.

=== Battle for southern Beirut ===
In early May, 1988, two Amal members were killed at a Hezbollah-manned roadblock in southwest Beirut. The ensuing clashes saw defections from Amal, and led to Hezbollah's occupation of Amal positions in the neighborhoods of Chyah and Ghobeiry. Amal commenced a large offensive on May 6 against its rival in the southern Beirut suburbs of Dahieh, overrunning Hezbollah positions in the neighborhood within the first 36 hours of fighting. The following day, however, a large combined Hezbollah-IRGC force, the latter assembling from the Beqaa Valley, penetrated the suburbs without being detected by Syrian troops. They rapidly advanced on Amal positions in a carefully planned offensive. An intervention by the Iranian Embassy established a 16-hour ceasefire that night, before which Hezbollah had occupied key positions in the area. Fighting was renewed the following afternoon, and persisted on a daily basis for the next few days, with intermittent ceasefire attempts. Syrian colonel Ghazi Kanaan, backed by Berri, proposed the deployment of Syrian troops in south Beirut to enforce a ceasefire. On May 11, Amal fighters were cornered in the western edge of the suburbs, having lost their headquarters in Bourj el-Barajneh to Hezbollah, and were left in control of only Chyah and parts of Ghobeiry. Hezbollah, on the other hand, had occupied about 80% of the suburbs, including the districts of Hayy Ma'adi, Haret Hreik, Bir al-Abed and Hayy Muawwad. By this day, up to 150 people had been killed and hundreds more were wounded. Representatives from Syria, Iran, Amal and Hezbollah convened at the Iranian Embassy in Beirut and formed the Quadripartite Committee that day, aiming to put an end to the conflict. They formulated a ceasefire, and a joint security force involving Syrian troops, the IRGC and fighters from both Amal and Hezbollah started patrolling the suburbs on May 12 as part of the agreement's terms.

"We greatly value our alliance with Iran, but our regional allies must respect our position … our role [in Lebanon] is above all other considerations. In their operations, our allies should pay attention to our interests and to those of our [Lebanese] friends. The movements of some [Lebanese] have become a threat to the Syrian role. We shall not allow the creation of complications in the Lebanese arena."
— Syrian Vice President, Abdul Halim Khaddam, in May 1988.

The ceasefire, however, collapsed 48 hours later. Opposition by Syria and Amal to the renewal of Hezbollah's pre-April presence in South Lebanon played a role in its failure to materialize. On May 13, Hezbollah began an offensive that pushed Amal fighters southward to the outer perimeter of the suburbs, occupying the district of Awzai. As they reached the main road connecting the capital to Beirut International Airport, they clashed with a Syrian military contingent that was manning a checkpoint there, resulting in the deaths of five Hezbollah fighters and a Syrian soldier. Iranian deputy foreign minister Hossein Sheikholeslam met that day with Syrian brigadier Ali Hammoud, who had threatened to "eradicate any militia presence" in the areas under Syrian control, in response to the incident. They both agreed upon another ceasefire, which broke down two days later on May 15. A seventh ceasefire came into effect the following night, but it foundered like the ones before it, and clashes were renewed on May 17. Hezbollah now controlled up to 90% of the suburbs, and about 250 people had been killed since the fighting began. The Syrian government was already considering taking matters into its own hands and had deployed between 5,000 and 7,000 troops to West Beirut who, by May 18, were told by their superiors that it was only a question of time before they marched on Dahieh. Hezbollah warned that Western hostages held in the suburbs would be killed should Syrian troops enter the area, while Berri was lobbying for Syria's Assad to intervene. Iran, fearing an armed confrontation between Syria and Hezbollah, intensified its diplomatic efforts to delay the planned Syrian intervention.

Another ceasefire agreement was reached by the Quadripartite Committee on May 21, and the fighting diminished. There was disagreement by Syrian and Amal representatives during the following negotiations in regards to an Iranian proposal, backed by Hezbollah, to establish a joint Syrian-Iranian peacekeeping force rather than a primarily Syrian one. There was also uncertainty over the issue of Hezbollah's re-establishment in South Lebanon. Fighting resumed on May 24, and Amal had lost its remaining possessions in Ghobeiry, retaining solely the district of Chyah in south Beirut. The following day, however, Assad and leading Hezbollah representatives reached an agreement in the Syrian port city of Latakia which allowed for a Syrian military deployment in the suburbs. Fighters from both sides were to withdraw from the streets and retreat to specific positions throughout the suburbs, and both factions were allowed to keep their offices. The death toll had so far reached 300. Syrian troops entered the neighborhood on May 27 at 11 a.m., before which fighters had disappeared from the streets. The first phase of the deployment involved 800 Syrian soldiers and 100 Lebanese gendarmes, while the second one involved 3,500 Syrian troops. On June 1, both Hezbollah and Amal agreed to exchange 200 and 58 detainees respectively. The fighting caused extensive damage to property in the suburbs, in addition to the displacement of up to 400,000 inhabitants.

=== Intermittent violence and propaganda ===
The exchange of propagandist accusations never ceased. On May 29, 1988, Amal publicized claims, citing its interrogation of Hezbollah captives, that its rival collaborated with Christian war factions, namely the Lebanese Forces (LF), (Note: The LF, which opposes Syrian presence in Lebanon, had sent weapons to Hezbollah from its power base in East Beirut.) during the clashes. Hezbollah quickly denied the accusation but confirmed that some of its members were still in captivity. It accused Amal of employing torture and of trying to undermine the Islamic resistance. There were spillover confrontations between the two in the Beqaa Valley both during the Beirut fighting and two months later in July. The Beqaa clashes drew two local families in the region on a collision course, as each was backing one of the warring factions. On 13 August a Hizbollah leader, Sheikh Ali Krayyim, was assassinated at an Amal checkpoint in South Lebanon. Further disagreements over a number of issues during the mediation attempts were accompanied by occasional skirmishes, kidnappings and executions, which began to intensify in September that year. In early October, three Amal leaders were assassinated in a Hizbollah ambush in southern Beirut. The killing of the three, Daoud Daoud commander in the Tyre area, Mahmud Faqin commander in Nabatiya and Hassan Sbaiti, was a significant loss for Amal’s forces in the south of Lebanon. Amal responded by expelling Hezbollah affiliates and their families from its territory. It identified three individuals whom it accused of being involved in the assassinations, and demanded they be handed over to Syrian authorities. The situation escalated in mid-October, despite attempts by Hezbollah to blame a third party. Clashes erupted in the Chyah district and in the Beqaa. The Beirut conflict intensified the following month, leaving 30 fatalities, following a car bombing which almost killed four leading Hezbollah officials on November 21, including Subhi al-Tufayli. The confrontations, for the first time since 1987, spread to Syrian-controlled parts of West Beirut and to the Ras Beirut district. Syrian troops ended the fighting by disarming units from both sides.

In May 1988 the Amal militia attacked Hizbollah forces in Siddikine in the South. After three days of fighting, in which fifty were killed, the Amal fighters succeeded in taking the village. At the time it had been Hizbollah’s last stronghold in Southern Lebanon.

Amal, later fearing a southward expansion by Hezbollah in the direction of Nabatieh, made a number of political moves, aiming to secure its other fronts in order to concentrate efforts on Hezbollah. Such moves included the signing of a peace agreement on December 22 with Arafat's Fatah movement, the PLO's leading faction, which was based in the Sidon region. (Note: Hezbollah, on its part, increased contacts with Palestinian factions rivaling Arafat's, and considered the notion of maintaining joint "resistance bases" in the south.) Berri also worked to improve Amal's relations with clans in the Beqaa for the same purpose.

=== Iqlim al-Tuffah war ===
Clashes re-erupted on December 31, 1988, at 3:30 p.m., until the intervention of a joint security committee two hours later, in the southern Chyah district of Beirut, as well as in the areas of Rawdat al-Shahidain, Abdel Karim al-Khalil and parts of Ghobeiry. Hundreds of families have fled the suburbs to West Beirut. The fighting later spread to Iqlim al-Tuffah in South Lebanon on January 2, 1989. It also spread to Beirut's downtown and the Khandaq al-Ghamiq district, two Syrian-controlled parts of West Beirut, on January 7. Clashes lasted for three hours there before Syrian troops intervened. The conflict was, by then, centered in Beirut. There were still occasional clashes in the Iqlim, however. On January 6, Amal accused its rival of shelling a house in Jbaa, while Hezbollah accused Amal of pounding its positions in Luwayza and Jabal Safi. Hezbollah blamed the violence on Amal and said that it had repelled a two-way assault by the latter on Nabi Safi.

On January 8, 1989, Hezbollah concentrated its presence in Jabal Safi, a hilly region located between the territories controlled by Amal and the Israeli-backed South Lebanon Army (SLA), forming a pocket there. It then launched a surprise offensive westward on Amal positions in Jbaa and its surroundings in the Iqlim, capturing the town, along with Kfar Fila, Kfar Melki and Kfar Heta. Amal counterattacked that night in Kfar Fila, and clashes ended the following morning on January 9, when it managed to retake the town following violent confrontations there between 7 and 10 a.m., during which hand grenades and melee weapons were used. The movement started conducting house-to-house raids in search of remaining Hezbollah elements in Kfar Fila after recapturing it. Its forces had done the same earlier in the villages of Kfar Heta and Kfar Melki, following Hezbollah's retreat from them and from the village of Mjaydal. A Lebanese security delegation visiting those villages noted in its report that it had found dozens of bodies along the streets there, and that the town of Kfar Fila was being shelled intermittently by Hezbollah artillery installations in Luwayza, Ain Bouswar and Jabal Safi. A group of women rallied in protest against the violence in Kfar Heta, and a general strike took place throughout South Lebanon, which was ordered by Amal's regional command in solidarity with the victims. Following the earlier battle in Kfar Fila, Amal forces later marched on the town of Jbaa from Ain Qana, and on Ain Bouswar. The movement had mobilized 300 militiamen in Tyre to reinforce its counteroffensive in the Iqlim. It said it had surrounded Hezbollah elements in a section of Jbaa that it claimed to have reoccupied there, following clashes that began at 9:30 a.m. on the outskirts of the town from the side overlooking Ain Qana. Amal then gathered more than 1,000 fighters to reinforce its positions, while Hezbollah brought 500 from the Beqaa. Armed militiamen were present on the entrances of villages and towns throughout the Nabatieh region, and masked men were detaining Hezbollah affiliates at roadblocks in the conflict zone and in Tyre. 20,000 refugees had moved from Iqlim al-Tuffah to either Sidon or further south, and at least 51 people were killed during these two days. Among those killed were a senior Amal official, former head of Nabi Berri’s bodyguard, along with ten people in his entourage, including relatives and bodyguards.

The fighting escalated in Jbaa on January 10 at around 11:30 a.m., as well as on the outskirts of Ain Bouswar. Amal deployed a relief force of about 500 fighters in the region encompassing Luwayza, Nabi Safi and Ain Bouswar, cutting off Hezbollah supply routes to the area. The battles saw the use of heavy artillery weapons. Hezbollah announced that it had repelled an Amal offensive on Ain Bouswar, and that the town was being shelled, along with Jbaa, from Amal positions in the villages of Sarba and Al-Zahrani. Ten Amal members who were killed during earlier clashes were buried in Kfar Heta that day, and the funeral procession was accompanied by a pro-Amal demonstration. On January 11, Amal launched a series of raids throughout the Tyre region, where the movement reportedly found a weapons depot belonging to Hezbollah in the village of Maaroub, and in the Bint Jbeil region, amid continuing skirmishes in the Iqlim. The following day, Amal launched an unsuccessful offensive on Jbaa, which failed to break through Hezbollah's defenses. Backed by rockets and artillery strikes from launchers stationed in Zefta, Arabsalim, Marwania and Houmine al-Fawqa, about 600 Amal fighters participated in the offensive, and made no significant territorial gains. (Note: No significant territorial changes had occurred on the front lines since the January 9 counteroffensive by Amal until the signing of a ceasefire agreement on January 25. The village of Jbaa, along with Ain Bouswar, are strategically located at higher altitudes than the Amal-held villages of Kfar Fila and Ain Qana at the bottom of the Jabal Safi hills. With the capturing of Jbaa, Hezbollah gained the upper hand in the coming battles, and the steep and exposed terrain leading to the hills made it even more challenging for Amal fighters to reach the Hezbollah villages.) Hezbollah, which was still controlling the entrance to Jbaa overlooking Kfar Fila, said it had repelled the offensive.

The conflict had been centered around Jbaa during the next two days, with some clashes occurring in Ain Bouswar and sniper shots targeting Kfar Fila from Jbaa. Shiite mufti Abdul Amir Qabalan proposed a plan for disengagement on January 13. His terms, which included a return to the status quo that existed prior the Iqlim war, were welcomed by Berri and by Mohammad Mehdi Shamseddine, president of the Supreme Islamic Shiite Council (SISC). (Note: Hezbollah rejected the SISC's authority over the country's Shiite community. Amal, on the other hand, sought to establish the council as a superior authority and supported its mediation attempts. Qabalan later reiterated Amal's position, and called on both sides to respect the SISC and its decision-making.) Hezbollah's Tufayli and Musawi said they had welcomed the proposal in theory but sought guarantees that they would be allowed to pursue resistance operations against Israel. Another general strike, organized by Amal, took place that day and involved different parts of Lebanon, including the south, the Dahieh suburb of Beirut and the Beqaa, condemning the events of "Black Saturday" and other "massacres" which it accused Hezbollah of having committed earlier that month. By January 16, the conflict had been limited to relatively minor exchanges over the front lines that were drawn during the previous Iqlim fighting. Both Amal and Hezbollah disengaged for a period of time, as part of an unofficial ceasefire, to allow members of the Red Cross in and out of the war zone. They organized funeral processions for their dead in Tyre and Dahieh respectively, which were accompanied by solidarity demonstrations. Both sides engaged in a war of accusations over the following days, accompanied by renewed clashes on January 17 shortly after the Red Cross left the area. Amal blamed the escalation on Hezbollah, and said that it had repelled an assault by the latter when it took advantage of Israeli artillery strikes on Amal's positions in Jarjouh, an event which Hezbollah flatly denied. On January 19, Amal struck Hezbollah positions in Jabal Safi from Sarba, and clashes took place on the Kfar Fila-Jbaa and Jarjouh-Ain Bouswar front lines, as well as in Beirut's Dahieh.

Clashes were renewed on the night of January 22 while talks were underway in Damascus to end the conflict, following two days of relative calm in Dahieh and in the Iqlim. The situation escalated the following evening until the morning of January 24. Hezbollah said it had repelled an Amal offensive, backed by rocket and artillery bombardment, on Jbaa. As part of the negotiations, Hezbollah said it would hand over the people responsible for the previous year's assassination of Amal's three commanders to Syrian authorities, on condition that it be allowed a strip of land in Amal territory from which it could launch armed assaults on Israeli and SLA targets, and that it be given a leading position in Amal's South Lebanon operations room. Those were some of the main points of contention during the meetings. A preliminary three-point agreement was reached in Damascus on January 25, which was announced by Syria and Iran, giving way to an official ceasefire arrangement. Until this moment, over 140 people had been killed in the January fighting. The ceasefire collapsed hours later, however, when both sides re-engaged in fighting over Jbaa that same day. The exchange of rocket and cannon fire intensified after 1:30 p.m., when Amal fired upon Jbaa and Ain Bouswar using 122mm and 130mm long-distance artillery weapons stationed in Sarba, Zefta and Marwania. Hezbollah retaliated by shelling Amal locations in Kfar Fila and Ain Qana. Fighting escalated in southern Beirut the following day around Amal's headquarters in Tahouitet al-Ghadir and in other parts of the suburbs. Amal blamed the Beirut escalation on Hezbollah. Both movements resumed the exchange of artillery fire in the Iqlim at 9:30 p.m., and reinforced their front lines there.

==== First Damascus Agreement ====
On January 30, 1989, representatives from Amal and Hezbollah signed the Damascus Agreement, a day after Syrian and Iranian officials gathered in Damascus and composed a draft of the document, before summoning the leaders of the warring factions to the Syrian capital. The agreement was supervised by Syria's foreign minister, Farouk al-Sharaa, and his Iranian counterpart, Ali Akbar Velayati. Among its terms, other than the ceasefire, were the cessation of media hostilities between the two, the return to the pre-April 1988 status quo in South Lebanon before the expulsion of Hezbollah, the withdrawal of all militiamen from Jbaa and Ain Bouswar, the establishment of a common operations room to coordinate the "resistance" against Israel, and the allowance of the UNIFIL to operate freely in the country without being harassed. Two other main points were the recognition of Amal's responsibility for the security of South Lebanon, while allowing Hezbollah to resume political and social activities there, and the handing over of Dahieh, which was dominated by Hezbollah, to the Syrian-sponsored security plan for Beirut. Both sides also agreed to protect internationals working in Lebanon. As a result the Red Cross resumed activities in Lebanon which it had suspended in December.

=== West Beirut clashes ===
At 10 p.m. on the night of July 1, 1989, Amal and Hezbollah clashed once again in West Beirut, in the Khandaq al-Ghamiq and Zuqaq al-Blat districts. The fighting, the origins of which remained unclear, proceeded intermittently and gradually spread to other districts of Beirut, such as Msaytbeh. It quickly escalated the following morning at around 7:45 a.m., after six hours of relative calm. Both sides engaged in burning and looting of property along Lija Street and the Salim Salam Bridge. Syrian troops intervened in neighborhoods where the clashes hadn't spread yet, to prevent spill over fighting there. A joint security team, comprising Amal, Hezbollah and Syrian forces, started patrolling the conflict zone at 8:30 p.m. to enforce the Damascus ceasefire. Representatives from both sides later met with Syria's Ali Hammoud at his office in the Beau Rivage Hotel in Beirut, and announced their commitment to the ceasefire.

On July 7, disagreement over the distribution of Amal and Al Ahed newspapers at a joint Amal-Hezbollah checkpoint in the Ouzai district of West Beirut resulted in street clashes which had spread by 2:30 p.m. to the Jnah and Bir Hassan districts. The fighting diminished an hour later following a Syrian Army deployment to the area, but flared once again at around 9 p.m. and later on spread to the areas surrounding the Iranian Embassy, near the road to the airport. Clashes resumed on July 8 at 9:25 p.m., and the following escalation resulted in serious damage to property, especially in Haret Hreik and the Iranian Embassy's surroundings. The situation remained tense and both sides were on high alert, despite joint diplomatic efforts in the Syrian capital to enforce the Damascus Agreement. Sniper shots in Ghobeiry and Haret Hreik during the early dawn hours of July 9 led to a re-escalation of fighting, with both sides clashing at the entrances of Dahieh with machine guns and artillery, almost isolating the suburbs from the rest of West Beirut. The fighting, which led to 9 deaths, was happening while Berri was on an official visit to Tehran. Amal said that it had conducted an offensive at around 3:30 p.m. to reclaim its Ouzai possessions that were lost two days earlier, accusing its rival of having started the fighting when Hezbollah elements infiltrated its territory in the area. The situation gradually calmed following the deployment of joint security committees in Ghobeiry and Hayy Farhat, which called for a ceasefire that evening. A Syrian Army contingent consisting of 300 soldiers deployed along the path from Ouzai to the main coastal road at around 8:45 p.m., and other forces stationed themselves in different conflict zones to separate the warring sides.

=== Beqaa battles spark new war in the south ===
Violent clashes started in the Western Beqaa on the night of December 3, 1989, at around 12 a.m., until a clear break from fighting took place from 7 to 9 a.m. the following morning, after which the violence re-escalated. Under the cover of repeated artillery shelling, both Amal and Hezbollah fighters raided each other's command centers in the towns of Sohmor and Machghara. By 2:30 p.m., Sohmor fell to Hezbollah following street battles there, where Amal's leading security official in the Western Beqaa was injured by an RPG strike on the movement's command center in the town. The Lebanese Army had set up checkpoints earlier at the entrances of Sohmor and Yohmor. The latter town was taken over by Hezbollah with relatively no violence, when its militants entered the homes of Amal members and disarmed them. Then the fighting in Machghara intensified at around 4 p.m., where Amal managed to retain only a small pocket near the town's northern entrance. Most of the Western Beqaa villages had come under Hezbollah's control by the end of the day. Amal was decisively defeated and lost its foothold in the region, and 15 people in total were killed, among them two Amal commanders in Sohmor. A joint Security Committee was formed, consisting of representatives from the warring factions, as well as Iranian Embassy and Syrian Army officials. The committee intervened to enforce a ceasefire agreement at 11:00 a.m. on December 5, and was handed over 29 Amal members held captive by Hezbollah. The situation gradually returned to normality, while militants and artillery installations were withdrawn from the conflict zone as part of the ceasefire's terms. The committee and the Red Cross coordinated the evacuation of the injured.

On December 7, fighting broke out once again around 11:30 a.m., this time in West Beirut. Amal and Hezbollah militants clashed repeatedly in the central areas of Khandaq al-Ghamiq, Basta al-Tahta, Basta al-Fawqa, Wadi Abu Jamil and in the old Souks region. Syrian troops began deploying two hours later amid efforts to establish a ceasefire. The attempts failed after a short period of relative calm, and the fighting resumed at the edges of the Msaytbeh district, around Sanayeh Park, Haoud al-Wilaya Park and El Murr Tower. A ceasefire came through at 5 p.m., and was enforced by the Syrian Army which started deploying in coordination with the joint Security Committee. Both sides started mobilizing afterwards throughout West Beirut and the southern suburbs of Dahieh. Limited clashes took place an hour later around the Souks and in the Lija neighborhood, and gradually diminished towards nightfall. From that point, overnight, only intermittent gunshots were heard in the area. Another ceasefire was officially announced at 8 a.m. the following morning while Syrian troops were still deploying, but it was followed by occasional street battles that took place in the Bourj Abi Haydar and Wadi Abu Jamil regions, as well as in the Iranian Cultural Moustasharia's surroundings further south. By 2 p.m., the situation had been largely contained by the Syrian Army, which had set up over twenty checkpoints throughout the conflict zone and sent armed patrols to West Beirut and the southern Dahieh suburbs, with orders to shoot any armed individual on sight. Nine deaths were confirmed since the beginning of the violence in Beirut, and the origins of this escalation remained obscure.

On December 20, Amal and Hezbollah started mobilizing in Iqlim al-Tuffah, amid increasing tension in the region. 2,000 Amal militiamen and 1,500 Palestinian fighters deployed to the Iqlim. (Note: A week earlier, 450 Palestinian fighters coming from Tunisia landed in the port city of Tyre. They were then met in the Rashidieh Camp, south of the city, by a number of Palestinian officials who escorted them to the Sidon region, and from there to Iqlim al-Tuffah, where they were assigned to combat positions.) A senior Hezbollah official said that it was only a matter of time before war broke out between the two rivals, and confirmed that PFLP-GC fighters also mobilized in Ain Bouswar and Jbaa, a Hezbollah-controlled town where Iranian physicians had arrived a month earlier and were assigned to field hospitals there. Berri received that day a delegation representing residents of the Iqlim, and reassured them that Amal would not allow the situation to escalate militarily. The mobilizations were met by general strikes in Tyre and Nabatieh the following day, where shops, schools and state institutions were closed. Street demonstrators in Nabatieh called for "ending the fitna" between the two movements, and a similar march was called for by Amal in Tyre. In Damascus, on December 22, Shamseddine met with Syrian and Iranian officials to discuss the situation in the Iqlim. At this point, about 1,500 Hezbollah fighters were reportedly stationed in the region.

War eventually broke out on December 23 at around 4 a.m., despite mediation talks underway in the Syrian capital, which were later attended by Nabih Berri. The fighting began when Hezbollah, aiming to connect its encircled pocket in Jabal Safi to the Mediterranean coast westward and to the Nabatieh region southward, launched an offensive similar to its earlier January campaign, though this time the initial push came from Jbaa. According to Amal's account of the events, the village of Ain Qana was attacked first, shortly after mortar fire targeted the movement's positions throughout the Iqlim, followed by Kfar Fila. A subsequent counteroffensive by Amal failed to regain much ground. To the north, an Amal installation near Bouslaiya was ambushed from two directions, one being Jbaa and the other Mjaydal. The latter saw repeated clashes, after which Hezbollah militants reportedly withdrew from the village. Hundreds of families had already left the Iqlim when the mobilizations began days earlier, while others set up checkpoints near the Amal-held villages of Ain Qana, Arabsalim and Mjaydal to limit the infiltration of Hezbollah affiliates to the region. Hezbollah fighters, who were less numerous but better equipped than Amal's, had managed to occupy Ain Qana, Kfar Fila and Bouslaiya during their initial offensive, with conflicting reports over Kfar Melki. The following day, Amal commenced another counteroffensive, backed by artillery strikes on Jbaa, but failed to make any significant advances on Kfar Fila. Its fighters did, however, manage to penetrate Ain Qana. To the north, Amal fortified its positions in Mjaydal, fearing further incursions by Hezbollah. The fighting devolved into minor skirmishing by nightfall, and was widely condemned by Lebanese Shiite figures like Qabalan and other politicians, such as Osama Saad of the Popular Nasserist Organization, which hosted a "national Islamic summit" in its Sidon headquarters denouncing the violence. Meanwhile, in Damascus, the Amal delegation headed by Berri insisted on the evacuation of villages recently occupied by Hezbollah as a precondition to a proposed ceasefire. According to Ad-Diyar, Hezbollah carried out an assault on Jernaya on the night of December 25, capturing the hill. Clashes took place the next day on the Jarjouh-Ain Bouswar front line. Hezbollah, which reportedly deployed 500 more fighters to the Iqlim since the war began, appeared to be pushing towards Jarjouh and Arabsalim, which were still controlled by Amal. (Note: Both sides have disputed the origins of the Jarjouh escalation, amid mutual accusations. Hezbollah blamed it on a "surprise attack" by Amal on its positions in Ain Bouswar. In a statement the following morning, Berri accused Hezbollah of having "exploited" the ceasefire arrangements to launch their offensive, and demanded that his rivals fully withdraw to Jbaa and Ain Bouswar or be "treated like any occupier" in South Lebanon. Hezbollah responded to Berri's statement by describing it as "political cover" for Amal.) On the same day, Berri made a visit to the Iqlim in an attempt to boost his men's morale. He spent that night near the front lines, where he met with senior Amal commanders and urged them to abide by a ceasefire that was proposed in Damascus. Clashes around Kfar Fila and Ain Qana had toned down considerably by then, but there was still fighting in the Jarjouh front on December 27. Iranian deputy foreign minister, Ali Mohammad Besharati, formally announced the ceasefire that evening during a press conference in Beirut.

On June 14, Al-Hayat reported that 2,500 people had been killed so far throughout the entire Amal-Hezbollah war, in addition to five thousand injuries.

=== "Hundred-day siege" ===
On July 16, 1990, Hezbollah fighters overran the Amal-held village of Jarjouh, as well as Kfar Melki, the nearest village in Iqlim al-Tuffah to the port city of Sidon. After several failed attempts by Amal to recover Jarjouh the following week, the movement went instead on the offensive in Kfar Melki on July 28. Backed by Palestinian guerilla fighters from the Hamas movement, Amal recaptured Kfar Melki. 16 people were killed during the offensive, among them a Palestinian, raising the death toll since mid-July to 166.

== See also ==
- Lebanese Civil War
- Mountain War (Lebanon)
- War of the Camps
- List of extrajudicial killings and political violence in Lebanon

== Sources ==
- Ayalon, Ami; Harris, William. W. (1990). Middle East Contemporary Survey, Volume 12. The Moshe Dayan Center. ISBN 9780813310442.
- Ayalon, Ami (1991). Middle East Contemporary Survey, 1989, Volume 13; Volume 1989. HarperCollins Canada. ISBN 9780813312460.
- Ayalon, Ami; Harris, William. W. (1992). Middle East Contemporary Survey, 1990, Volume 14; Volume 1990. The Moshe Dayan Center. ISBN 9780813314495.
- Azani, Eitan (2011). Hezbollah: The Story of the Party of God: From Revolution to Institutionalization. Springer. ISBN 9780230116290.
- Berti, Benedetta (2013). Armed Political Organizations: From Conflict to Integration. JHU Press. ISBN 9781421409740.
- Blanford, Nicholas (2011). Warriors of God: Inside Hezbollah's Thirty-Year Struggle Against Israel. Random House Publishing Group. ISBN 9780679605164.
- El-Khazen, Farid (2000). The Breakdown of the State in Lebanon, 1967-1976. Harvard University Press. ISBN 9780674081055.
- Gambill, Gary C.; Abdelnour, Ziad K. (February 2002). "Hezbollah: Between Tehran and Damascus". 4 (2). Middle East Intelligence Bulletin.
- Goodarzi, Jubin M. (2009). Syria and Iran: Diplomatic Alliance and Power Politics in the Middle East. I.B.Tauris. ISBN 9780857717245.
- Hamzeh, Ahmad Nizar (2004). In The Path Of Hizbullah. Syracuse University Press. ISBN 9780815630531.
- Harris, William; Haris, William W. (2014). Lebanon: A History, 600 - 2011. Oxford University Press. ISBN 9780190217839.
- Hijazi, Ihsan A. (December 23, 1989). "Lebanon militias are splintering". The New York Times.
- Hijazi, Ihsan A. (December 24, 1989). "2 Shiite militas battle in Lebanon". The New York Times.
- Hijazi, Ihsan A. (December 25, 1989). "Iran, Fearing Loss of Syria Tie, Widens Aid to Lebanon Shiites". The New York Times.
- Hijazi, Ihsan A. (July 29, 1990). "Militia in Lebanon drives back enemy". The New York Times.
- Kadi, Samar (January 9, 1989). "53 die as battle between Shiite Moslems rages on". The Indianapolis Star (UPI). p. 3.
- Kaj, Riad (January 3, 1989). "Rival Shiite militiamen battled for the fourth day Tuesday". UPI.
- Khaled, Abdel Mawla (December 25, 1989). "Inter-Shiite fighting continues despite Iranian mediation". UPI.
- Khaled, Abdel Mawla (January 18, 1990). "Amal shows hideout where Col. Higgins allegedly was held". UPI.
- Khaled, Abdel Mawla (July 28, 1990). "Rival Shiite forces resume battle". UPI.
- Khaled, Abdel Mawla (July 29, 1990). "Lebanon fighting prevents Red Cross from removing bodies". UPI.
- Ladki, Nadim (January 12, 1989). "Rival Shiite Moslem militiamen fought for a hilltop village". UPI.
- Lamloum, Olfa (2010). "Retour sur les traces d'un conflit" (PDF). Institut Français du Proche-Orient (in French).
- Levitt, Matthew (2015). Hezbollah: The Global Footprint of Lebanon's Party of God. Georgetown University Press. ISBN 9781626162013.
- Nir, Omri (2011). Nabih Berri and Lebanese Politics. Springer. ISBN 9780230117631.
- Norton, Augustus R. (2014). Hezbollah: A Short History. Princeton University Press. ISBN 9781400851447.
- Norton, Augustus R. (December 2007). "The Role of Hezbollah in Lebanese Domestic Politics" (PDF). 42 (4). The International Spectator.
- O'Ballance, Edgar (1998). Civil War in Lebanon, 1975-92. Springer. ISBN 9780230374683.
- Osoegawa, Taku (2013). Syria and Lebanon: International Relations and Diplomacy in the Middle East. I.B.Tauris. ISBN 9780857722911.
- Rabil, Robert G. (2011). Religion, National Identity, and Confessional Politics in Lebanon: The Challenge of Islamism. Springer. ISBN 9780230339255.
- Rabinovich, Itamar; Olmert, Yosef (1988). Middle East Contemporary Survey, 1986, Volume 10; Volume 1986. The Moshe Dayan Center. ISBN 9780813307640.
- Rabinovich, Itamar; Olmert, Yosef (1989). Middle East Contemporary Survey, 1987. The Moshe Dayan Center. ISBN 9780813309255.
- Ranstorp, Magnus (1996). Hizb'Allah in Lebanon: The Politics of the Western Hostage Crisis. Springer. ISBN 9780230377509.
- Saoud, Dalal (December 29, 1989). "Hezbollah calls for dialogue with rival Moslem militia". UPI.
- Szekely, Ora (2016). The Politics of Militant Group Survival in the Middle East: Resources, Relationships, and Resistance. Springer. ISBN 9783319401416.
- "Rival Shiite militias battle in Beirut". UPI. January 7, 1989.
- "Cease-fire has little impact in Lebanon". UPI. January 26, 1989.

=== Arabic sources ===
- Rehan, Fady (November 15, 2007). ""مقاومة".. الحرب الأهلية وإقليم التفاح" ["Resistance".. the Civil War and Iqlim al-Tuffah]. Al-Mustaqbal.
- "انتكاسة امنية في الشياح" [Escalation in Chyah]. Ad-Diyar. January 1, 1989. p. 4.
- "انتكاسة مسائية في "الغربية" ومناوشات في الاقليم" [Night escalation in West Beirut and skirmishes in the Iqlim]. Ad-Diyar. January 7, 1989. p. 5.
- "حرب اثبات الوجود بين الحركة والحزب في الاقليم استمرت في يومها الثالث" [Third day in the war for domination between the Movement and the Party in the Iqlim]. Ad-Diyar. January 10, 1989. p. 5.
- "أمل شيّعت 10 من عناصرها بينهم مسؤولها في كفرحتى" [Amal buries 10 of its members, including its local commander in Kfar Heta]. Ad-Diyar. January 11, 1989. p. 5.
- "يوم من الهدوء النسبي تخللّته مداهمات وعمليات تمشيط في اقليم التفاح" [A day of relative calm disrupted by raids and search operations]. Ad-Diyar. January 12, 1989. p. 5.
- "أمل شنّت هجمات على جباع والحزب أعلن فشلها" [Amal launches an offensive on Jbaa and the Party announces its failure]. Ad-Diyar. January 13, 1989. p. 5.
- "بري : الاصراب ضد مجزرة "السبت الأسود"" [Berri: The strike is to condemn the "Black Saturday" massacre]. Ad-Diyar. January 14, 1989. p. 3.
- "اقتراح لقبلان بتشكيل لجنة محايدة وسحب المسلحين" [Qablan suggests forming a neutral committee and that militiamen withdraw]. Ad-Diyar. January 14, 1989. p. 5.
- "قبلان بعد لقائه القائم بالاعمال الايراني : "أمل " وافقت على مبادرتي وننتظر ردّ الحزب" [Qablan: Amal agrees to my proposal and we await the Party's response]. Ad-Diyar. January 15, 1989. p. 5.
- "أمل و حزب الله شيّعا عدداً من القتلى وسط تظاهرات وحملات" [Amal and Hezbollah bury their dead amid demonstrations and campaigns]. Ad-Diyar. January 17, 1989. p. 6.
- "انتكاسة في اقليم التفاح" [Escalation in Iqlim al-Tuffah]. Ad-Diyar. January 18, 1989.
- "فشل الاتصالات واللجنة الامنية في وقف القتال بين امل وحزب الله" [Failure to communicate by the security committee to stop the fighting between Amal and Hezbollah]. Ad-Diyar. January 20, 1989. p. 6.
- "القوات السورية كثفت تدابيرها" [Syrian forces increase their efforts]. Ad-Diyar. January 22, 1989. p. 6.
- "مفاوضات في دمشق لإنهاء القتال" [Negotiations underway in Damascus to end the fighting]. Ad-Diyar. January 24, 1989. p. 4.
- "لقاءات دمشق تواصلت و "حزب الله" وافق على تسليم قتلى قادة امل الى السوريين" [Damascus meetings continue and Hezbollah agrees to hand over the assassins of Amal's leaders to the Syrians]. Ad-Diyar. January 25, 1989. p. 1.
- "اشتباكات في اقليم التفاح و حذر في الضاحية" [Clashes in Iqlim al-Tuffah and alarming situation in Dahieh]. Ad-Diyar. January 25, 1989. p. 6.
- "اتفاق من 3 بنود نتيجة 3 ايام من المفاوضات خرق بعد 3 ساعات" [3-point agreement reached in 3 hours as a result of 3 days of negotiations]. Ad-Diyar. January 26, 1989. p. 6.
- "انتكاسة في الضاحية واشتباكات في الاقليم بعد يوم على وقف النار" [Escalation in Dahieh and clashes in the Iqlim a day after the ceasefire]. Ad-Diyar. January 27, 1989. p. 6.
- "التوازن السياسي بين امل وحزب الله طرح خطير" [Political balance between Amal and Hezbollah is a serious consideration]. Ad-Diyar. January 28, 1989. p. 4.
- "اتفاق من 8 بنود لإنهاء الصراع بين امل وحزب الله" [8-point agreement to end the struggle between Amal and Hezbollah]. Ad-Diyar. January 31, 1989. p. 5.
- "وقف النار وانتشار سوري في اماكن القتال" [Ceasefire and Syrian deployment to the conflict zone]. Ad-Diyar. July 3, 1989. p. 5.
- "اشتباكات بين امل وحزب الله وسقوط قتيلين وتسعة جرحى" [Clashes between Amal and Hezbollah with 2 killed and 9 wounded]. Ad-Diyar. July 8, 1989. p. 5.
- "امل – حزب الله" [Amal-Hezbollah]. Ad-Diyar. July 8, 1989. p. 14.
- "اجواء توتر بين أمل و حزب الله" [Tension between Amal and Hezbollah]. Ad-Diyar. July 9, 1989. p. 6.
- "اشتباكات عنيفة بين امل و حزب الله" [Violent clashes between Amal and Hezbollah]. Ad-Diyar. July 10, 1989. p. 5.
- "اشتباكات عنيفة بين أمل و الحزب" [Violent clashes between Amal and the Party]. Ad-Diyar. December 5, 1989. p. 1.
- "عودة الهدوء الى سحمر ويحمر ومشغرة" [Calm returns to Sohmor, Yohmor and Machghara]. Ad-Diyar. December 6, 1989. p. 5.
- "من البقاع الغربي الى بيروت الغربية" [From the Western Beqaa to West Beirut]. Ad-Diyar. December 8, 1989. p. 5.
- "معارك صباحية والسوريون تدخلوا للفصل بين امل وحزب الله" [Morning battles and the Syrians intervene to separate between Amal and Hezbollah]. Ad-Diyar. December 9, 1989. p. 5.
- "حشودات عسكرية في اقليم التفاح" [Military mobilization in Iqlim al-Tuffah]. Ad-Diyar. December 21, 1989. p. 5.
- "نشاط بري" [Berri's activity]. Ad-Diyar. December 21, 1989. p. 3.
- "وأد الفتنة بين امل وحزب الله" [Ending the strife between Amal and Hezbollah]. Ad-Diyar. December 22, 1989.
- "بعد البقاع الغربي وبيروت الغربية سقط اتفاق دمشق في اقليم التفاح" [After Western Beqaa and West Beirut, fall of the Damascus Agreement in Iqlim al-Tuffah]. Ad-Diyar. December 24, 1989. p. 5.
- "اقليم التفاح" [Iqlim al-Tuffah]. Ad-Diyar. December 24, 1989. p. 6.
- "ميدانياً" [On the ground]. Ad-Diyar. December 25, 1989. p. 1.
- "أمل اشارت إلى اشتراك فلسطينيين" [Amal suggests Palestinian involvement]. Ad-Diyar. December 25, 1989. p. 5.
- "اتصالات لتهدئة الوضع وبري في الجنوب مساء" [Calls to calm the situation and Berri in the south that evening]. Ad-Diyar. December 27, 1989. p. 7.
- "امل – حزب الله" [Amal-Hezbollah]. Ad-Diyar. December 27, 1989. p. 8.
- "بشاراتي اعلن وقف النار في اقليم التفاح مساءً" [Besharati announces ceasefire in Iqlim al-Tuffah on evening]. Ad-Diyar. December 28, 1989. p. 7.
