= Yohmor =

Yohmor may refer to the following places in Lebanon:

- Yohmor, Beqaa
- Yohmor, Nabatieh
