= Aitanite =

Aitanite عيتنيت
- Village
- Location in Lebanon
- Coordinates: 33°33′46″N 35°40′08″E
- Country: Lebanon
- Governorate: Beqaa Governorate
- District: Western Beqaa
- Elevation: 3,440 ft (1,050 m)
- Time zone: UTC+2 (EET)
  - Summer (DST): +3

Aitanite/ Aitaneet (Arabic: عيتنيت, romanized: ʿAytanīt) is a village in Lebanon, in the West Beqaa region. Aitanit is located in the southern region of Lebanon, particularly the Beqaa Valley. Aitanit is also located about 1070 meters above sea level and is currently on the edge of a mountain. Below the mountain and the village is Lake Quaroun (Litani river). In addition, the villages overlooks the village Qaraoun, which is just across the lake, And it also lays north of the town Mashghara. The whole region around the village are farmlands and pastures filled with grape, olive trees, and many other fruit plants.

== History ==
In 1838, missionary and scholar Eli Smith noted 'Aithenit as a village on the West side of the Beqaa Valley, next to Bab Mari'a.

Aitanit has approximately 880 residents. In the municipal Lebanese elections of 2004, its accounted 3,263 registered voters of which 1,784 actual voters. If the total number of Aitanite citizens who have emigrated were included the figure would be nearer to 20,000.

Aitanite is a popular summer destination for many Lebanese living abroad whose families originated from this area. Many former Aitaneet families live in Cleveland, Michigan, Ottawa, and Montreal. Many people return in the summer to visit friends and family members. Currently, many of the townspeople are elderly or children because other locals reside in the capital region of Beirut, or elsewhere for job/business opportunities.

Aitanit has two churches serving the village, one for the Maronites and the other is Melkite Catholic. The village is predominantly Catholic but is surrounded by the neighboring Muslim town of Machghara and Christian villages of Bab Mareh, Saghbine, and Ain Zebde.

Aitanit has one school taught by the nuns of the village.

Aitanit is about (45 km) 45 minutes from Zahlé (Capital of the Bekaa valley region) and about an hour and thirty minutes from Beirut. In the winter, Aitanit experiences cool, wet, snowy conditions (about 10/50 degrees in the day and about 1/33 or 1/34 degrees in the night) but in the summer, it experiences hot dry conditions (30/86 to 37/99 in the day and about 20/68 to 28/82 in the night). Each year, Aitanit holds a festival called Eid Al Sayde. At the festival, you can experience food cooked by the women of the town, fireworks and loud dabke music. Dabke is a traditional Lebanese dance.

== Climate ==
Climate data for Aitanit - Machghara-Qaroun-West Bequa'a
Month	Jan	Feb	Mar	Apr	May	Jun	Jul	Aug	Sep	Oct	Nov	Dec	Year
Mean daily maximum °C (°F)	10 (50)	12 (52)	16 (60)	18 (64)	21 (69)	26 (79)	29 (84)	30 (86)	26 (78)	20 (68)	16 (59)	13 (55)	19 (67)
Mean daily minimum °C (°F)	3 (37)	6 (42)	10 (50)	12 (54)	15 (59)	17 (62)	20 (68)	21 (70)	19 (67)	15 (59)	9 (48)	4 (39)	12 (53)
Average precipitation mm (inches)	130 (6.5)	100 (5)	60 (3)	20 (1)	5 (0.25)	0 (0)	0 (0)	0 (0)	20 (1)	60 (3)	90 (4.5)	120 (6)	580 (29.25)
Source: Weatherbase

== Bibliography ==
- Robinson, E.; Smith, E. (1841). Biblical Researches in Palestine, Mount Sinai and Arabia Petraea: A Journal of Travels in the year 1838. Vol. 3. Boston: Crocker & Brewster.

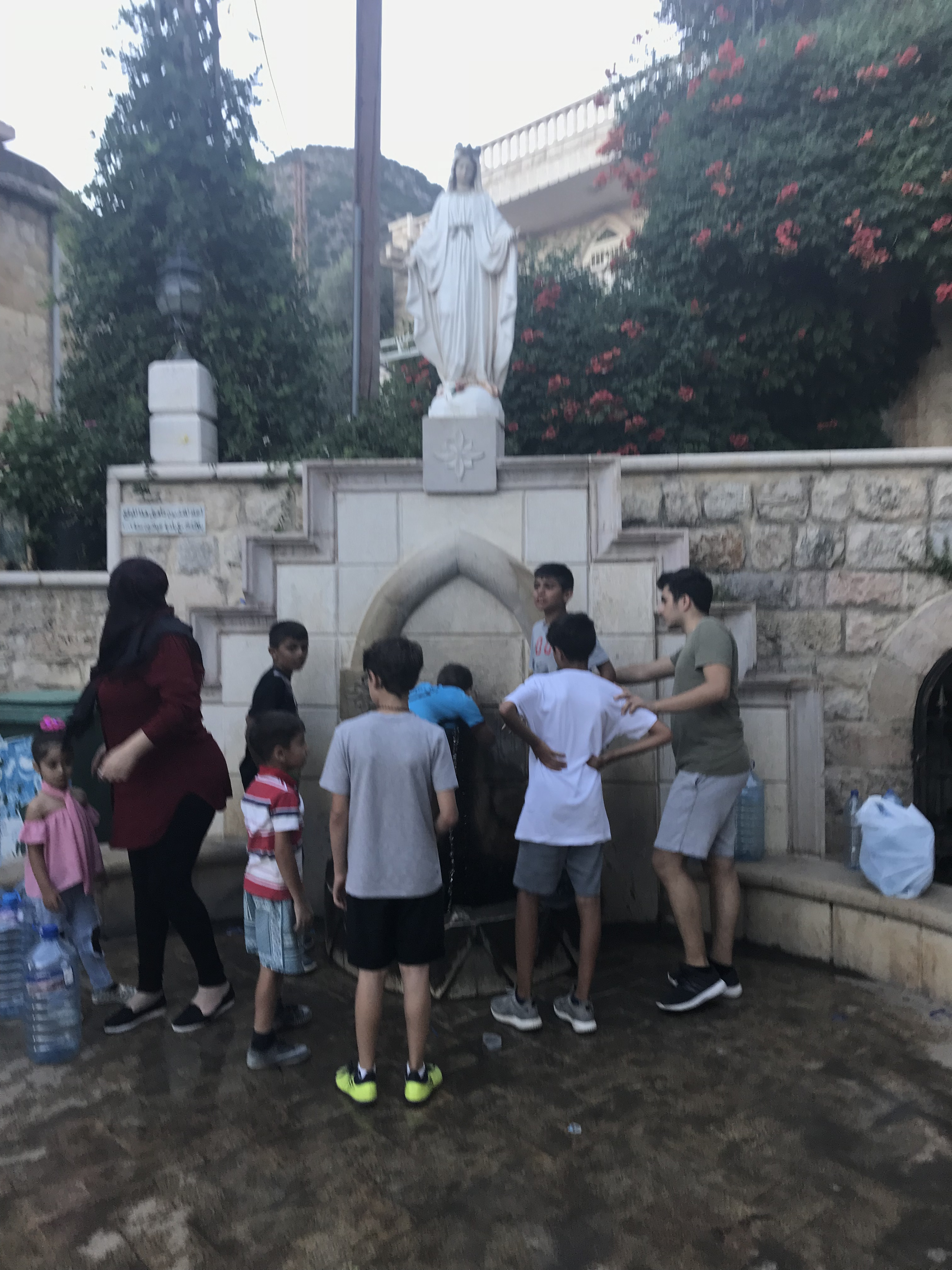
Gathering water
