= Iskandar Ghanem =

Lebanese army general (1911–2005)

6th Commander of the Lebanese Armed Forces
- In office 24 July 1971 – 10 September 1975
- President: Suleiman Frangieh
- Preceded by: Jean Njeim
- Succeeded by: Hanna Said

Personal details
- Born: Iskandar Assad Ghanem; 1911 Saghbine, Ottoman Empire
- Died: 4 February 2005 (aged 94)
- Resting place: Saghbine, Lebanon
- Children: 3, including Robert Ghanem
- Awards: Order of the Cedar

Military service
- Allegiance: French Lebanon; Lebanon
- Branch/service: Army of the Levant; Lebanese Army
- Years of service: 1934–1945 (French Lebanon); 1945–1975 (Lebanon Republic)
- Rank: General
- Battles/wars: Second World War; 1948 Israeli-Arab War; 1958 Lebanon Crisis; Lebanese Civil War

Iskandar Ghanem (Arabic: إِسْكَنْدَر غَانِم; 1911 – 4 February 2005) was a Lebanese army general who was the commander-in-chief of the Lebanese army in the period from 1971 to 1975. He was close to Suleiman Frangieh and held the post during his presidency.

== Early life and education ==
Ghanem was born in Saghbine, West Bekaa, in 1911 and hailed from a Maronite family. From 1934 he attended the military school and graduated as a second lieutenant in 1937.

== Career and activities ==
Ghanem was a major in 1958 and worked for the Beirut-based headquarters of the American Brigadier General Sidney S. Wade who was commanding the landing force of the Sixth Fleet which had been tasked to assist the Lebanese Army during the turmoil between July and October 1958. Later he was dismissed from the Lebanese army, but he rejoined the army on 24 July 1971 when he was promoted to the rank of general. Immediately after his promotion Ghanem was appointed commander-in-chief of the army. Ghanem replaced Jean Njeim in the post who died in a helicopter crash on 24 July 1971.

During his term Ghanem directly report to the President Suleiman Frangieh, although he should have reported to the Prime Minister. In May 1975 he was also named minister of national defense and minister of electrical and hydraulic resources in the military cabinet led by retired brigadier general Nureddine Rifai. Ghanem served as commander-in-chief of the army until his removal from office until 10 September 1975. Ghanem organized the purge of Chehabist officers from the Lebanon army during his term as commander-in-chief. He was succeeded by Hanna Said in the post in September 1975.

Following the end of his tenure Ghanem joined the Kataeb Party in 1976.

== Controversy ==
The Mossad agents attacked the headquarters of Palestinians in Lebanon on 10 April 1973 and killed three Palestinians who were the leaders of the Black September Organization. The Palestinians murdered in the incident were Kamal Nasser, Muhammad Youssef Najjar, and Kamal Adwan. Following the incident the Lebanese Prime Minister Saeb Salam argued that Ghanem did not attempt to resist the Israeli attack disobeying the orders.

Therefore, Salam requested the dismissal of Iskandar Ghanem, and the Sunni community also called for his removal from the post. However, Salam's request was not accepted by the President Suleiman Frangieh which led to the resignation of Salam.

The Muslim leaders continued their opposition to Ghanem. The Christian politicians also joined them shortly after the deadly clashes in Sidon in March 1975 demanding the dismissal of Ghanem, and also, two members of the cabinet were resigned from their posts in protest over him. Ghanem was asked to not perform his role as army commander on 1 July, and Colonel Jules Bustante temporarily replaced him in the post.

Ghanem was finally dismissed from office in September 1975. One of the reasons for his removal was his logistical support for the Christian militias. Joseph A. Kéchichian cites the latter as one of the factors led to the disintegration of the Lebanese Army.

== Personal life and death ==
Ghanem was married and had three sons. One of his children was Robert Ghanem who was a lawyer and served as the education minister in the second cabinet of Rafic Hariri in the mid-1990s.

Iskandar Ghanem died on 4 February 2005. A funeral ceremony was held for him on 7 February in the Maronite Cathedral of Saint George in Beirut. He was buried in Saghbine.

=== Awards ===
Ghanem was the recipient of the Order of the Cedar. He was first awarded the rank of commander and then the rank of grand officer.
