= Ghazzeh =

Ghazzeh غزة
- City
- Location in Lebanon
- Coordinates: 33°40′16″N 35°49′39″E
- Country: Lebanon
- Governorate: Beqaa Governorate
- District: Western Beqaa
- Elevation: 2,850 ft (870 m)
- Time zone: UTC+2 (EET)
  - Summer (DST): +3

Ghazzeh (Levantine Arabic: غزة, romanized: Ghazzeh) is a city located in the Western Beta District of the Beqaa Governorate in Lebanon. Its population is around 70,000 citizens and 22,000 Syrian refugees. It is known for its emmigration to South American countries.

== History ==
In 1838, missionary and scholar Eli Smith noted it as 'Azzeh (mistaking Arabic غ gh for ع ʿ) under "Places on the West side of the Bŭkâ'a, from the southern extremity northward to Zahleh"; it is listed before Bab Mareaa.

Around 70% of the citizens of this medium-sized city immigrated into South American countries such as Venezuela and Brazil as a result of the 1982 Israeli invasion of southern Lebanon, although Israel did not conquer the town.

== Bibliography ==
- Robinson, E.; Smith, E. (1841). Biblical Researches in Palestine, Mount Sinai and Arabia Petraea: A Journal of Travels in the year 1838. Vol. 3. Boston: Crocker & Brewster.
