= War of the Two Brothers =

War of the Two Brothers may refer to:

- Inca Civil War, 1529–1532, Peru
- Liberal Wars, 1828–1834, Portugal
- War of Brothers, 1988–1990, Lebanon
