= Sultan Yacoub =

Sultan Yacoub سلطان يعقوب
- Village
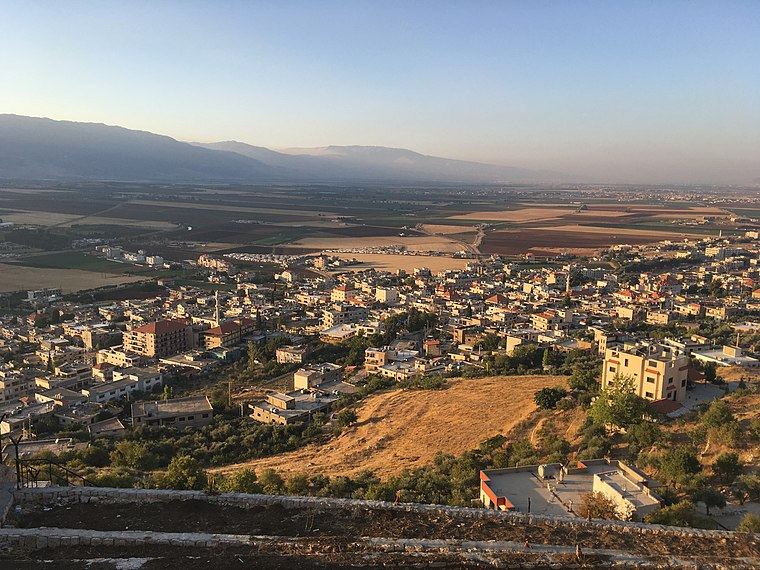
- Sultan yacoub, 2023

- Location in Lebanon
- Coordinates: 33°38′36″N 35°51′35″E
- Country: Lebanon
- Governorate: Beqaa Governorate
- District: Western Beqaa District
- Time zone: UTC+2 (EET)
  - Summer (DST): +3

Sultan Yacoub (Sultan Yakoub, Sultan Yaakov) (Arabic: سطان يعقوب, romanized: Sulṭān Yaʿqūb) is a Lebanese village in the West Beqaa District, about seven kilometers (four miles) from the border with Syria.

== History ==
=== Name ===
The village is named after Yacoub ibn Ibrahim ibn Adham (d. 782), the son of the famous Sufi master nicknamed Sultan, and buried in nearby Jableh, Syria, as the inscription on the grave reads. However, a myth was perpetuated lately by journalists on Lebanese and Moroccan online media eager for click baits and shocker headlines, who confused the Yacoub in question with the Almohad ruler Yaqub al-Mansur (d. 1199).

Two clerics from the region tried to write a history of their town, and they too conflated Sultan Yacoub ibn Ibrahim, with the most famous of all Almohad rulers, Yaqub al-Mansur, and they copy/pasted included several pages from Ibn Khaldun and Ibn Adhari concerning the Almohad sultan in their editions of the history of the village, to the point where excerpts from their book having been printed and posted on the entrance of the shrine, thereby further reinforcing the myth among the unassuming locals.

=== Battle in the Lebanon War ===
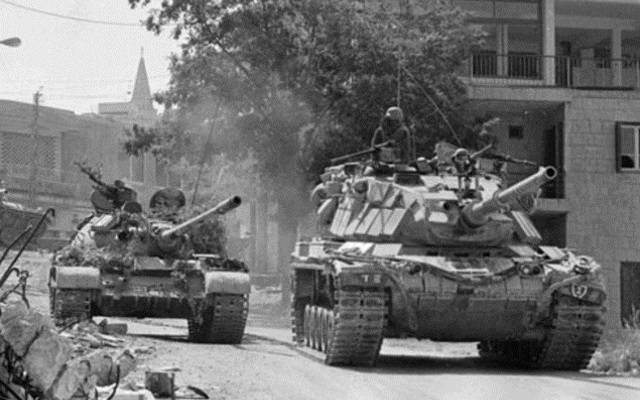
Battle of sultan yacoub, 1982

The battle for Sultan Yacoub, part of the Lebanon War, occurred on June 12, 1982. During the battle, a column of Israel Defense Forces (IDF) armored vehicles were ambushed at a narrow pass near the Beqaa Valley by the Syrians. Eighteen IDF soldiers died in the battle, which was viewed as an Israeli intelligence failure. Three IDF soldiers remain unaccounted for. Five soldiers were captured with two being released in subsequent exchange deals. Reports say that the remaining three were paraded through Damascus held on top of their captured tank. Time magazine reporter Dean Brelis testified to having seen the three captives alive at the time. Among the three is an American citizen named Zachary Baumel, whose remains were returned after an Israeli intelligence operation on April 3, 2019, Zvi Feldman, whose remains were recovered in May 2025, and Yehuda Katz, who remains missing.

=== Syrian influence ===
After the evacuation of Lebanon in April, 2005 by Syria, Sultan Yacoub remains a focal point of tension over sovereignty. The Popular Front for the Liberation of Palestine-General Command has a base nearby the village, and dozens of PFLP-GC have been caught trying to sneak illegally across the Beqaa Valley to Sultan Yacoub.

=== Rocket attacks on Israel ===
In May, 2006, three to eight Katyusha rockets were fired at northern Israel from Lebanon. The IDF responded by with a missile strike on the PFLP base at Sultan Yacoub.

== Demography ==
In 1838, Eli Smith noted Sultan Yacoub's population all being Sunni Muslim.

Along with Baaloul, the village was an important source for Arab immigration to Southern America, especially Brazil and Colombia where entire Arab immigrant communities are made exclusively from people originally from these two villages, such as in Maicao, Colombia.

== Bibliography ==
- Robinson, E.; Smith, E. (1841). Biblical Researches in Palestine, Mount Sinai and Arabia Petraea: A Journal of Travels in the year 1838. Vol. 3. Boston: Crocker & Brewster.
