= Baaloul =

Baaloul بعلول (البقاع الغربي) Baalool
- Village
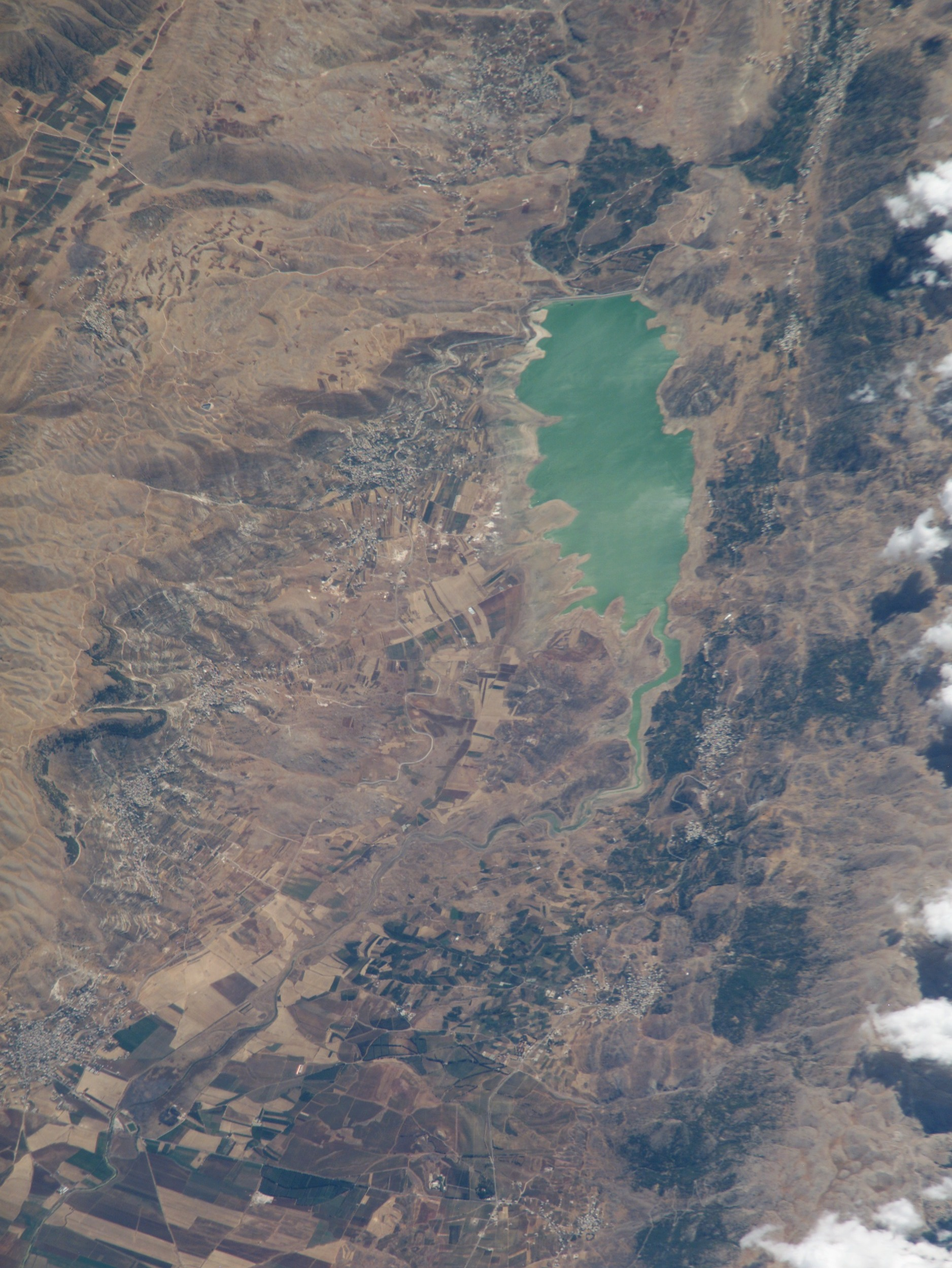
- Litani valley, Lake Qaraoun and villages Lala and Baaloul

- Location in Lebanon
- Coordinates: 33°35′23″N 35°45′2″E
- Country: Lebanon
- Governorate: Beqaa
- District: Western Beqaa

Baaloul (Arabic: بعلول, romanized: Bʿalūl) is a town located in the western Bekaa Valley in Lebanon.

== Overview ==
Baaloul lies within the upper Litani river basin and is located along a mountainous area bordering Mount Lebanon. It is primarily agricultural and is bounded by the village of Lala to the northeast, and the village of Karaoun to southwest. The current population is approximately 200 native people from the village, considering that many residents live abroad. The community lies in a religiously diverse district that contains both Christian and Muslim families.

In 1838, Eli Smith noted Baaloul's population being predominantly Sunni Muslims. However, by 1982, during the Lebanese Civil War, statistics indicated that the population included both Christians and Muslims.

On 19 October 2024, three people in the town were killed by an Israeli airstrike, including the mayor of Sohmor, Hajj Haidar Shahla during the 2024 Israeli invasion of Lebanon.

== Bibliography ==
- Robinson, E.; Smith, E. (1841). Biblical Researches in Palestine, Mount Sinai and Arabia Petraea: A Journal of Travels in the year 1838. Vol. 3. Boston: Crocker & Brewster.
