= 1984 Sohmor massacre =

1984 mass killing in a Lebanese village

- Part of 1982 Lebanon war
- Location: 33°31′7″N 35°41′8″E; Sohmor, Beqaa, Lebanon
- Date: 20 September 1984 (UTC+03:00)
- Attack type: Mass murder
- Deaths: 13
- Injuries: 20-40
- Perpetrators: South Lebanon Army; Israel Defense Forces (support)
- No. of participants: 300+
- Motive: Revenge, Islamophobia
- Convicted: 15

The 1984 Sohmor massacre, also known as the first Sohmor massacre, took place on 20 September 1984 when Druze members of the Israeli-backed South Lebanon Army, opened fire at a group of Shia civilians, killing 13 civilians in the Lebanese village of Sohmor.

== Background ==
Sohmor is a Shia Muslim village in Western Beqaa. The South Lebanon Army, led by Antoine Lahad consisted mainly of Christian and Druze militiamen trained and armed by Israel.

== Attack ==
Previously, 3-4 Druze militia were killed and 5 were wounded in an ambush within Sohmor. While the IDF encircled the village, the SLA gathered 300 men, aged 16 to 39 years, in the main square to investigate the recent ambush. Once there, the SLA militia began to shoot at the villagers and throw grenades at them. While screaming "this is for what you did to the patrol last night". The killing went on for 15 to 30 minutes, killed were 13 and 20-40 were wounded.

Some wounded villagers were taken to Israel for treatment.

== Aftermath ==
Lebanese Information Minister Joseph Skaff called the attack part of a "series of massacres perpetrated by Israel or encouraged by it and carried out under its direct coverage and with its full support". IDF officials blamed the massacre on the SLA.

Israel had wanted to use the 1500 strong SLA to take over security duties in Southern Lebanon, but the massacre raised doubts amongst Israeli leader ship that the SLA could be molded into a professional military as Israel had hoped.

The IDF detained 15 SLA militiamen they believed had taken part in the massacre and courtmartialed them.

== See also ==
- Lebanese Civil War
- 1978 South Lebanon conflict
- 1982 Lebanon War
- Israeli war crimes
