= Libbaya =

Libbaya لبايا
- Town
- Location in Lebanon
- Coordinates: 33°28′57″N 35°43′26″E
- Country: Lebanon
- Governorate: Beqaa Governorate
- District: Western Beqaa District

Libbaya ((Arabic: لبايا, romanized: Libbāyā)) is a village in the Beka'a Valley of Lebanon, situated in the Western Beqaa District of the Beqaa Governorate. It lies southeast of Sohmor.

== History ==
There is a Roman temple near the town that was called Ain Libbaya or Ayn Libbaya. It was classified amongst a group of Temples of Mount Hermon by George Taylor.

In 1838, Eli Smith noted Libbaya's population as being Metawileh.

During the war in the 1980s, four Israeli Cobra helicopters backing the attacking force strafed Libbaya and nearby villages, killing a Lebanese soldier.

== Bibliography ==
- Taylor, G. (1971). The Roman temples of Lebanon: a pictorial guide. Les temples romains au Liban; guide illustré. Dar el-Machreq Publishers.
- Robinson, E.; Smith, E. (1841). Biblical Researches in Palestine, Mount Sinai and Arabia Petraea: A Journal of Travels in the year 1838. Vol. 3. Boston: Crocker & Brewster.
