= Sohmor =

Sohmor سحمر
- Town
- Location in Lebanon
- Coordinates: 33°31′7″N 35°41′8″E
- Country: Lebanon
- Governorate: Beqaa Governorate
- District: Western Beqaa District

Sohmor (Levantine Arabic: سحمر, romanized: Soḥmor) is a small town in the Beka'a Valley of Lebanon, situated in the Western Beqaa District and south of the Beqaa Governorate. It lies south of Lake Qaraoun on the Litani River. It lies southeast of Machgara, northeast of Ain Et Tine, north of Yohmor, west of Mazret Al Chmis and northwest of Libbaya.

== History ==
In 1838, Eli Smith noted Sahmur as a village on the West side of the Beqaa Valley, north of Yohmor inhabited by Metawileh. It is a Shiite village.

It was the site of the 1984 Sohmor massacre committed by Druze members of the South Lebanon Army, backed by the Israel Defense Forces.

== Bibliography ==
- Robinson, E.; Smith, E. (1841). Biblical Researches in Palestine, Mount Sinai and Arabia Petraea: A Journal of Travels in the year 1838. Vol. 3. Boston: Crocker & Brewster.
