= Lala, Lebanon =

Lala, Lebanon لالا
- Village
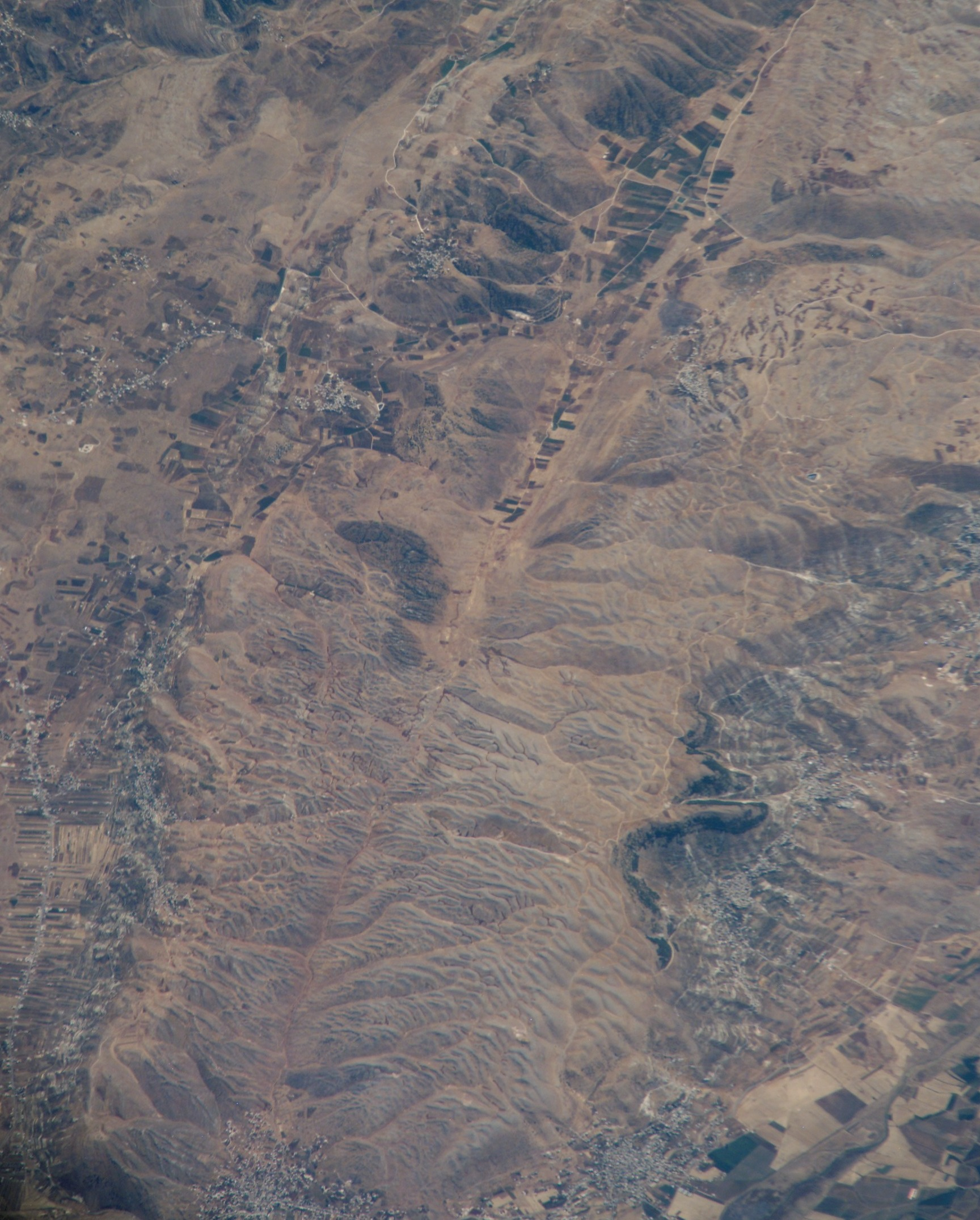
- landscape of Mount Baaloul, village Lala and Baaloul,

- Location in Lebanon
- Coordinates: 33°36′01″N 35°45′44″E
- Country: Lebanon
- Governorate: Beqaa Governorate
- District: Western Beqaa

Area
  - Total: 5.31 sq mi (13.74 km^{2})
- Elevation: 3,670 ft (1,120 m)
- Time zone: UTC+2 (EET)
  - Summer (DST): +3

Lala (Arabic: لالا, romanized: Lālā), is a village located in the Western Beqaa District of the Beqaa Governorate in Lebanon.

== History ==
In 1838, Eli Smith noted it as Lala; a Sunni Muslim village in the Beqaa Valley. It remains a Sunni Muslim village in modern times.

The 2,500 residents of Lala relied on the village's 7,500 emigrants living abroad for 70% of their income.

== Bibliography ==
- Robinson, E.; Smith, E. (1841). Biblical Researches in Palestine, Mount Sinai and Arabia Petraea: A Journal of Travels in the year 1838. Vol. 3. Boston: Crocker & Brewster.
