= Haouch El Harimeh =

Haouch El Harimeh حوش الحريمة
- Village
- Location in Lebanon
- Coordinates: 33°43′12″N 35°51′20″E
- Country: Lebanon
- Governorate: Beqaa Governorate
- District: Western Beqaa District
- Elevation: 2,820 ft (860 m)
- Time zone: UTC+2 (EET)
  - Summer (DST): +3

Haouch El Harimeh (Levantine Arabic: حوش الحريمة, romanized: Ḥawsh el-Ḥarīmeh) is a village located in the Western Beqaa District of the Beqaa Governorate in Lebanon.

== History ==
In 1838, Eli Smith noted Haush Harimeh's population as being Sunni Muslim.

== Bibliography ==
- Robinson, E.; Smith, E. (1841). Biblical Researches in Palestine, Mount Sinai and Arabia Petraea: A Journal of Travels in the year 1838. Vol. 3. Boston: Crocker & Brewster.
