= Seddiqin =

Seddiqin صديقين
- Municipality
- Location within Lebanon
- Coordinates: 33°11′24″N 35°18′37″E
- Grid position: 179/288 PAL
- Country: Lebanon
- Governorate: South Governorate
- District: Tyre District
- Elevation: 370 m (1,210 ft)
- Time zone: UTC+2 (EET)
  - Summer (DST): UTC+3 (EEST)
- Dialing code: +9617

Seddiqin or Siddiqin (Arabic: صديقين, romanized: Ṣiddīqīn) is a municipality in Southern Lebanon, located in Tyre District, Governorate of South Lebanon. It is situated 2km south of Qana beside the main road to Tibnin.

== Etymology ==
E. H. Palmer wrote that the name means "the truthful ones". The Arabic name is transliterated as Siddikine or Seddiqine.

== History ==
In 1596, it was named as a village, Sidiqin, in the Ottoman nahiya (subdistrict) of Tibnin under the liwa' (district) of Safad, with a population of 46 households, all Muslim. The villagers paid a fixed tax rate of 25% on agricultural products, such as wheat, barley, summer crops, fruit trees, goats and beehives, in addition to occasional revenues; a total of 10,752 akçe.

In 1875, Victor Guérin noted: "Here are what appears to be the remains of an ancient synagogue. Its direction is from south to north, which is the general direction of the ancient synagogues of Palestine; and, besides, here I remarked two monolithic pillars, cut one side in pilaster fashion, and rounded on the other side like a half column. This kind of pillar generally terminates the end of the range of columns in these synagogues."

In 1881, the PEF's Survey of Western Palestine (SWP) described it: "A village, built of stone, with many ruined houses; contains about 150 Metawileh; surrounded by figs, gardens, and arable land. Water from cisterns and 'Ain el Tuzeh."

They further noted: "There are remains of an early Christian site at this village; some well-dressed stones scattered about with crosses on them: There are also rock-cut cisterns, tombs, and stone olive and wine presses. The site of the ancient place was a little to the north of the present village."

In May 1988, during the fighting between Amal and Hizbollah, the Amal militia attacked Hizbollah forces in Seddiqin. After three days of fighting, in which fifty were killed, the Amal fighters succeeded in taking the village. At the time it had been Hizbollah’s last stronghold in Southern Lebanon.

In April 1996, during the Israeli operation "Grape of Wrath", hundreds of villagers from Seddiquin sought refuge in a UN campound in Qana. Israeli artillery shelled the camp, killing around a hundred civilians.

On 19 May 2021, about two weeks after the beginning of the 2021 Israel–Palestine crisis, four rockets were reportedly launched from near Seddiqin towards Israel. According to the Israel Defense Forces (IDF), its missile defences intercepted one of them, while the other projectiles fell in open areas. The IDF fired artillery in response, apparently towards the outskirts of Seddiqin.

== Demographics ==
In 2014 Muslims made up 99.76% of registered voters in Seddiqin. 99.36% of the voters were Shiite Muslims.

== Bibliography ==
- Conder, C.R.; Kitchener, H.H. (1881). The Survey of Western Palestine: Memoirs of the Topography, Orography, Hydrography, and Archaeology. Vol. 1. London: Committee of the Palestine Exploration Fund.
- Guérin, V. (1880). Description Géographique Historique et Archéologique de la Palestine (in French). Vol. 3: Galilee, pt. 2. Paris: L'Imprimerie Nationale.
- Hütteroth, W.-D.; Abdulfattah, K. (1977). Historical Geography of Palestine, Transjordan and Southern Syria in the Late 16th Century. Erlanger Geographische Arbeiten, Sonderband 5. Erlangen, Germany: Vorstand der Fränkischen Geographischen Gesellschaft. ISBN 3-920405-41-2.
- Palmer, E.H. (1881). The Survey of Western Palestine: Arabic and English Name Lists Collected During the Survey by Lieutenants Conder and Kitchener, R. E. Transliterated and Explained by E.H. Palmer. Committee of the Palestine Exploration Fund.
- Rhode, H. (1979). Administration and Population of the Sancak of Safed in the Sixteenth Century. Columbia University. Archived from the original on 2016-10-10.
