= Abir El Saghir =

Lebanese cook and Social media influencer

- Born: September 24, 1998 (age 28); Western Beqaa District, Lebanon
- Education: LIU
- Occupations: Social media personality; chef
- Known for: TikTok cooking videos
- Awards: Joy Award for Favorite Female Influencer

YouTube information
- Channel: @abirsaghir
- Genre: Cooking
- Subscribers: 9.23 million
- Views: 3.7 billion

Abir El Saghir (born September 24, 1998) is a Lebanese celebrity cook and social media influencer. Her TikTok account is followed by more than 31 million people with over 500 million views.

She started studying interior design at LIU but left to pursue her career.

== Career ==
El Saghir has more than 31 million followers on TikTok, where her videos show cooking from around the world.

In 2023 she won a Joy Award for Favorite Female Influencer.
