= Robert Ghanem =

Lebanese lawyer and politician (1942–2019)

Personal details
- Born: Robert Iskandar Ghanem; 8 May 1942 Lebanon
- Died: 10 February 2019 (aged 76)

Robert Ghanem (Arabic: روبير غانم; 8 May 1942 – 10 February 2019) was a Lebanese lawyer and politician.

== Early life ==
Ghanem hailed from a Maronite family. He was the son of Lebanese army general Iskandar Ghanem.

== Career ==
Robert Ghanem was a longtime deputy of the National Assembly of Lebanon and was the minister of education in the second government of Rafic Hariri. Robert Ghanem was a candidate for President of Lebanon and participated in the 2014 Lebanese presidential election.

=== Views ===
Robert Ghanem was a member of the March 14 alliance. But nevertheless, Ghanem is viewed as a moderate politician with relations across the political spectrum.

== Personal life ==
Ghanem was married to the journalist Viviane Haddad since 23 January 1975 and father of two children. Ghanem died on 11 February 2019 after a brief illness.
