= Aana =

Aana عانا
- Village
- Location in Lebanon
- Coordinates: 33°41′40″N 35°45′20″E
- Country: Lebanon
- Governorate: Beqaa Governorate
- District: Western Beqaa
- Elevation: 3,180 ft (970 m)
- Time zone: UTC+2 (EET)
  - Summer (DST): +3

Aana (Arabic: عانا, romanized: ʿĀnā) is a village in the Western Bekaa District of Lebanon, situated at an average altitude of 970 meters (3,180 ft) above sea level, about 57 km (35 mi) from Beirut. Its name comes from the Syriac word "'ono", which means 'the flock'. The village has two churches, one dedicated to St. Elias (Elijah) and the other to the Virgin Mary in the adjacent borough of Deir Tahniche. The village produces wine and fruit. The wines of Chateau Musar grow in a tract of land about 5 km (3.1 mi) long, land that is the home of Lebanese-Brazilian Carlos Eddé.

== History ==
In 1838, Eli Smith noted it as ''Ana; a village on the West side of the Beqaa Valley.

== Physical properties ==
Average altitude: 970 metres (3,180 ft)

== Economy and agriculture ==
The village is notable for its agricultural production, particularly wine as Aana is home to vineyards that contribute to Lebanon's wine industry. A tract of land about 5 km (3.1 mi) long in the area is used for growing grapes for Chateau Musar wines. The village is also known for its fruit production, taking advantage of the fertile soil in the Bekaa Valley.

== Bibliography ==
- Robinson, E.; Smith, E. (1841). Biblical Researches in Palestine, Mount Sinai and Arabia Petraea: A Journal of Travels in the year 1838. Vol. 3. Boston: Crocker & Brewster.
