= Yohmor, Nabatieh =

Yohmor يحمر
- Municipality
- Location in Lebanon
- Coordinates: 33°18′45″N 35°31′3″E
- Grid position: 129/152 L
- Country: Lebanon
- Governorate: Nabatieh Governorate

Yohmor (Levantine Arabic: يحمر, romanized: Yoḥmor) is a municipality in the Nabatieh Governorate of Lebanon. It is located about 8 km from the town of Nabatieh. It lies above the bend of the Litani River, north of the lower Litani and west of the upper Litani. Beaufort Castle is located on the east side of the village.

== History ==
Yohmor has been proposed as the place of origin of Jesus of Yohmor, whose name appears in a Greek inscription from the late antique Jewish necropolis at Beit She'arim, although Yohmor in the Beqaa Valley has also been proposed as an alternative identification.

In the 1596 tax records, it was named as a village, Yuhmur, in the Ottoman nahiya (subdistrict) of Sagif under the liwa' (district) of Safad, with a population of 42 households and 5 bachelors, all Muslim. The villagers paid a fixed tax-rate of 25 % on agricultural products, such as wheat, barley, olive trees, goats and beehives, in addition to "occasional revenues" and a press for olive oil or grape syrup; a total of 4,800 akçe.

In 2024 till 2026, the village was bombed with white phosphorus by the Israel Defense Force.

== Demographics ==
In 2014 Muslims made up 99.59% of registered voters in Yohmor. 98.86% of the voters were Shiite Muslims.

The village has a population of about 2,000, although the population swells to a much higher number in the summer. Prime agricultural crops include olives and tobacco.

== Bibliography ==
- Hütteroth, W.-D.; Abdulfattah, K. (1977). Historical Geography of Palestine, Transjordan and Southern Syria in the Late 16th Century. Erlanger Geographische Arbeiten, Sonderband 5. Erlangen, Germany: Vorstand der Fränkischen Geographischen Gesellschaft. ISBN 3-920405-41-2.
- Rhode, H. (1979). Administration and Population of the Sancak of Safed in the Sixteenth Century (PhD). Columbia University. Archived from the original on 2020-03-01.
