= Jean Njeim =

- جان آغا نجيم

5th Commander of the Lebanese Armed Forces
- In office 7 January 1970 – 25 July 1971
- Preceded by: Emile Boustany
- Succeeded by: Iskandar Ghanem

Personal details
- Born: 1915 Kfartyeh-Caza, Keserwan, Ottoman Empire
- Died: 24 July 1971 (aged 55–56)

Military service
- Allegiance: Lebanon
- Branch/service: Lebanese Army
- Rank: General
- Battles/wars: 1948 Israeli-Arab War; 1958 Lebanon Crisis; Palestinian insurgency in South Lebanon

Jean Njeim (Arabic: جان آغا نجيم) (1915 – 24 July 1971) was a Lebanese Army general commander. He was born in Kfartyeh-Caza, Keserwan, Ottoman Empire in 1915. He entered the Military Academy at Homs as a cadet officer in 1933. He was promoted to colonel in 1959 and to brigadier general in 1965 and to general in 1967. Njeim was appointed commander of the Lebanese Army on 7 January 1970, replacing Emile Bustani who had been removed from the post. Njeim opposed to the expansion of the Palestine Liberation Organization in Lebanon. He was in office until his death in a helicopter crash on 24 July 1971. He was succeeded by Iskandar Ghanem as commander of the Lebanese Army.
