= Ain Zebdeh =

Ain Zebdeh عين زبدة
- Village
- Location in Lebanon
- Coordinates: 33°37′20″N 35°42′12″E
- Country: Lebanon
- Governorate: Beqaa Governorate
- District: Western Beqaa
- Elevation: 3,580 ft (1,090 m)
- Time zone: UTC+2 (EET)
  - Summer (DST): +3

Ain Zebdeh (Levantine Arabic: عين زبدة, romanized: ʿAyn Zibdeh), is a village located in the Western Beqaa District of the Beqaa Governorate in Lebanon.

== History ==
In 1838, Eli Smith noted it as 'Ain Zibdeh; a village on the West side of the Beqaa Valley.

== Bibliography ==
- Robinson, E.; Smith, E. (1841). Biblical Researches in Palestine, Mount Sinai and Arabia Petraea: A Journal of Travels in the year 1838. Vol. 3. Boston: Crocker & Brewster.
