= Saghbine =

Saghbine صغبين
- Village
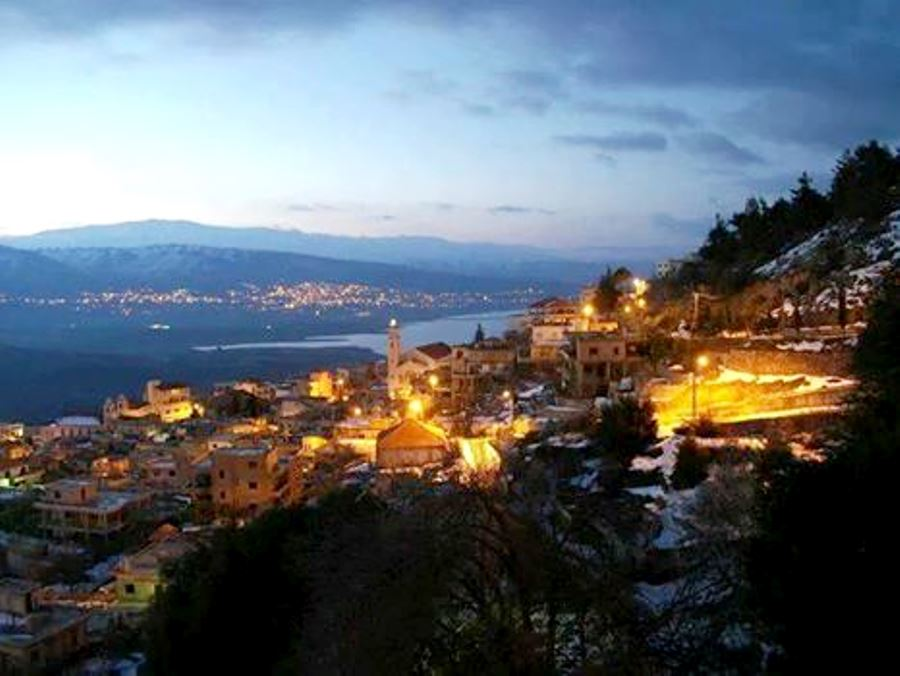
- Saghbine, 2015

- Location in Lebanon
- Coordinates: 33°36′39″N 35°41′58″E
- Country: Lebanon
- Governorate: Beqaa Governorate
- District: Western Beqaa
- Elevation: 3,757 ft (1,145 m)
- Time zone: UTC+2 (EET)
  - Summer (DST): +3

Saghbine (Arabic: صغبين, romanized: Ṣaghbīn), is a village located in the Western Beqaa District of the Beqaa Governorate in Lebanon.

== Location ==
Saghbine town is located on the eastern slope of Western Lebanese Mountains, at the foot of Mount Niha, by the Litani River in the heart of West Bekaa.

== History ==
In 1838, Eli Smith noted it as Sughbin; a Maronite and Catholic village on the West side of the Beqaa Valley, listed after Machghara.

The origin of the name “Saghbine” is commonly related to the hardness and stubbornness of its men. However, Moufarrej, in the Lebanese Encyclopedia, states that origin of the name Saghbine is Aramaic and refers to the “rugged mountain trails”.

During the early phases of the Lebanese Civil War, Saghbine was a strategic location in the Western Beqaa District. On November 25, 1975, the village was captured by Joint Forces units comprising the Palestine Liberation Organization (PLO) and the Lebanese National Movement (LNM). During this event, twelve Christian civilians were summarily executed.

The village saw further violence during the 1982 Lebanon War. On June 8, 1982, as the Israel Defense Forces (IDF) advanced through the region, retreating PLO and LNM forces re-entered Saghbine. Between 14 and 20 residents were killed in an incident described as a retaliatory action during the retreat. This occurred just prior to the aerial engagement known as Operation Mole Cricket 19 on June 9, which took place in the nearby airspace.

== See also ==
- List of extrajudicial killings and political violence in Lebanon

== Bibliography ==
- Robinson, E.; Smith, E. (1841). Biblical Researches in Palestine, Mount Sinai and Arabia Petraea: A Journal of Travels in the year 1838. Vol. 3. Boston: Crocker & Brewster.
