= Machghara =

Machghara مشغرة
- Town
- Location in Lebanon
- Coordinates: 33°31′41″N 35°39′6″E
- Country: Lebanon
- Governorate: Beqaa Governorate
- District: Western Beqaa District

Population (1997 census estimates)
  - Total: 6,800

Machghara (Arabic: مشغرة), also spelled Mashghara, is a town in the Beqaa Valley of Lebanon, situated in the Western Beqaa District and south of the Beqaa Governorate. It lies just to the northwest of Sohmor and southwest of Lake Qaraoun, south of Aitanit and north of Ain Et Tine, and 45km(28mi) south east of the capital Beirut. The Iskander Spring lies to the northeast of the village.

There were 9,944 registered voters in Machghara in 2010. The inhabitants of the town are Greek Orthodox, Greek Catholic and Shia Muslims. On 14 June 1986 the Syrian army entered Machghara to enforce a truce that they had brokered between Hezbollah and the SSNP. During a week of fighting Hezbollah had taken control of the town.

== History ==
Ottoman tax registers in 16th century indicate Machghara had two imams, 389 households and 26 bachelors, all Muslims.

== Geography ==
The city is located at an average of 1,050 meters above sea level, more than 200 meters above the course of the Litani River. It leans against the eastern slope of the Mount Lebanon massif. Machghara is part of the Western Beqaa District Caza which has 18 localities.

== Demographics ==
In 2014, Muslims made up 60.44% and Christians made up 38.87% of registered voters in Machghara. 58.17% of the voters were Shiite Muslims and 26.28% were Greek Catholics.

== People from Machghara ==
- Al-Hurr al-Amili (1624–1693)
- Nicolas Hajj (1907–1995)
- Zaki Nassif (1918–2004)
- Salim Ghazal (1931–2011)
- Farah Omar (1998–2023)
- Wassim Salamoun (b. 1952), 30th and current Lieutenant Governor of Prince Edward Island in Canada
- Riad Sharara (1940-1994)
