= Western Beqaa District =

Coordinates: 33.6264°N 35.7841°E

Western Beqaa District قضاء البقاع الغربي
- District
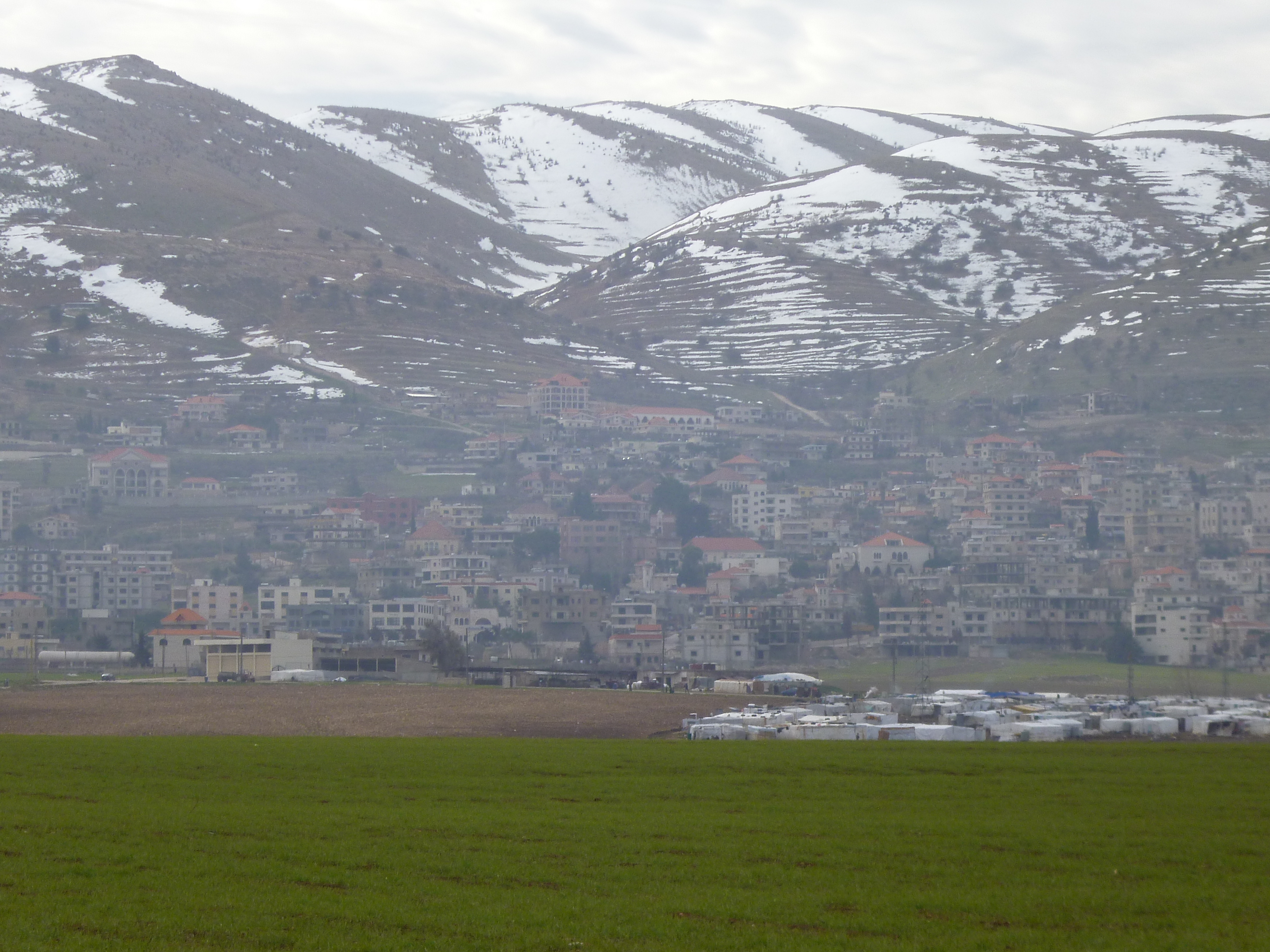
- Joub Jannine

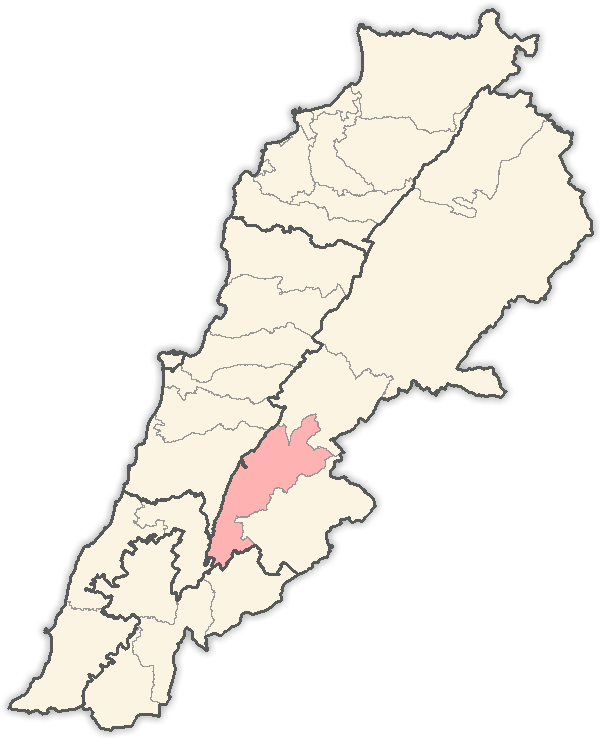
- Location in Lebanon
- Country: Lebanon
- Governorate: Beqaa Governorate
- Capital: Joub Jannine
- Major Cities: Machgara, Joub Jannine

Area
  - Total: 164 sq mi (425 km^{2})

Population
  - Estimate (31 December 2017): 150,838
- Time zone: UTC+2 (EET)
  - Summer (DST): UTC+3 (EEST)

Western Beqaa District (Arabic: قضاء البقاع الغربي) is an administrative district in the Beqaa Governorate of the Republic of Lebanon. The capital is Joub Jannine which has a population of 12,000.

Most of the residents of the district are Sunni Muslims, with a Christian and Shiite minority living alongside them. Many residents immigrate from the district to the major cities in Lebanon, such as Beirut.

In comparison to other regions of Lebanon, this region was not severely damaged during the Lebanese Civil War.

== Geography ==
On the geographic border of Western Baqaa District are the Anti-Lebanon Mountains, which border with Syria. Within this area is the artificial lake or reservoir of Lake Qaraoun which was created in 1959.

== Economy and social aspects ==
Western Beqaa District, along with Rachaya, is considered to have a greater sense of security compared to other parts of the Bekaa region. The district has been affected by the halting of trade with and through Syria, which has impacted local economic activities.

The labor force in Western Beqaa faces challenges, with the presence of Syrian refugees sometimes leading to competition for jobs. This has contributed to some tension between host communities and refugees, especially following events in nearby areas like Aarsal in 2014.

== Demographics ==
Year	Christians					Muslims			Druze
Year	Total	Greek Catholics	Maronites	Greek Orthodox	Other Christians	Total	Sunnis	Shias	Druze
2014	23.51%	10.12%	9.56%	3.06%	0.77%	75.65%	53.99%	21.66%	0.51%
2022	24.65%	10.08%	9.89%	3.74%	0.94%	74.89%	53.19%	21.70%	0.46%

== Main cities and towns ==
West Beqaa has a few main cities such as:

- Joub Jannine
- Kefraya
- Marj, Lebanon
- Dahr El Ahmar

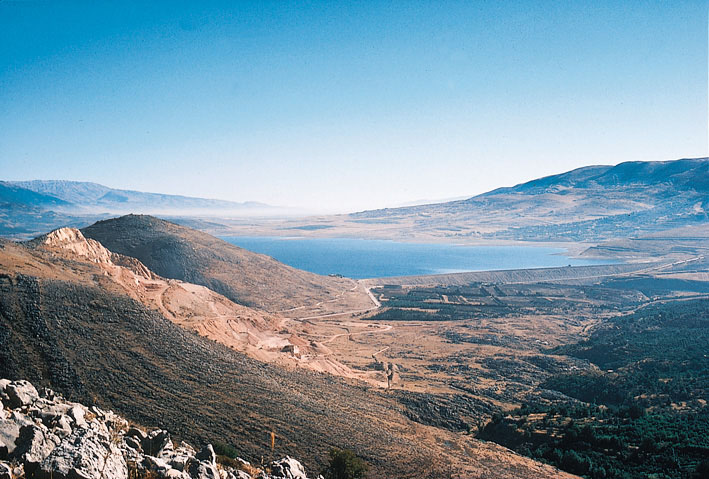
Qaraoun Lake, Western Beqaa District

== Other towns ==
Other smaller villages located in West Beqaa

- Aammiq
- Aana
- Ain el Tineh
- Ain Zebdeh
- Aitanite
- Baaloul
- Bab Mareaa
- Chabraqiyet Aammiq
- Chabraqiyet Tabet
- Dakouh
- Deir Ain Jaouzeh
- Deir Tahnich
- Ghazzeh
- Haouch Aammiq
- Haouch al Saalouk
- Haouch El Saiyad
- Haouch El Harimeh
- Kamid el-Loz
- Kelya
- Kfar Danis
- Kherbet Kanafar
- Khiara
- Lala
- Libbaya
- Machghara
- Manara
- Mansourah District
- Mazraat El Chmis
- Meidoun
- Nasrieyh
- Qaraoun
- Rawda
- Sawiri
- Saghbine
- Sohmor
- Sultan Yacoub Tahta
- Sultan Yacoub Fawqa
- Tal El Akhdar
- Tal Zaazaa
- Tell Zenoub
- Yohmor
- Zilaya

== Notable residents ==
- Abir El Saghir
