= Yohmor, Beqaa =

Yohmor يحمر
- City
- Location in Lebanon
- Coordinates: 33°29′9″N 35°40′11″E
- Country: Lebanon
- Governorate: Beqaa Governorate
- District: Western Beqaa District
- Elevation: 3,080 ft (940 m)

Yohmor or Yohmor al Beqaa (Arabic: يحمر (البقاع الغربي)) is a large village in the Beka'a Valley of Lebanon, situated in the Western Beqaa District in the south of the Beqaa Governorate. It lies south of Sohmor. The main source of income comes from olive cultivation. Citizens of the Village are predominantly Shia Muslim.

== History ==
Yohmor in the Beqaa Valley has been proposed as the place of origin of Jesus of Yohmor, mentioned in a Greek inscription from the late antique Jewish necropolis at Beit She'arim. Yohmor in the Nabatieh Governorate has also been suggested as an alternative identification.

In 1838, Eli Smith noted Yahmur as a village on the West side of the Beqaa Valley.

On 15 April 1996, during the seventeen day bombardment of south Lebanon by the Israeli army and air force, the hydroelectric power station on the Litani River, one kilometre north-east of Yohmor, was destroyed in an air raid.

A HRW report published in 2011 described Yohmor as having a population of 7,500, consisting of around 400 families. 60% of the workforce where involved in agriculture. 150 families made their living growing tobacco. On 12 August 2006, two days before the end of the 2006 Lebanon War, Yohmor was blitzed by the IDF with 155mm artillery and air strikes. Cluster bombs landed on the village. Most of the inhabitants had fled the war zone and only twenty families remained. Unexploded bomblets littered the roads, gardens, on roofs and inside houses. Investigators found US made CBU-58 and BLU-63 bombs as well as missile fragments date stamped 1973. In the following two months, as villagers returned to their homes, one person was killed and five injured by these weapons.

== Bibliography ==
- Robinson, E.; Smith, E. (1841). Biblical Researches in Palestine, Mount Sinai and Arabia Petraea: A Journal of Travels in the year 1838. Vol. 3. Boston: Crocker & Brewster.
