= Lake Qaraoun =

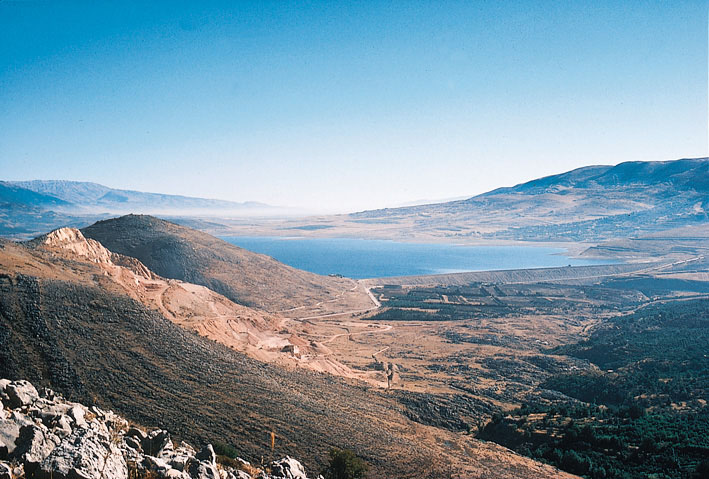
- Qaraoun Lake created behind the Albert Naccache dam

- Location within Lebanon
- Location: Beqaa Valley
- Coordinates: 33°34′21″N 35°41′51″E
- Type: Multipurpose reservoir
- Primary inflows: Litani River
- Primary outflows: Litani River
- Catchment area: 1,600 km^{2} (600 sq mi)
- Basin countries: Lebanon
- Surface area: 1,190 ha (2,940 acres)
- Water volume: 220×10^{6} m^{3} (0×10^{9} cu ft)
- Surface elevation: 861 m (2,825 ft)
- Settlements: Qaraoun Village, Aitanit, Beirut 76 km (47 mi) away

Lake Qaraoun (Arabic: بحيرة القرعون / ALA-LC: Buḥayrat al-Qara‘ūn) is an artificial lake or reservoir located in the southern region of the Beqaa Valley, Lebanon. It was created near Qaraoun village in 1959 by building a 61 m-high (200 ft) concrete-faced rockfill dam (the Albert Naccache dam which is the largest dam in Lebanon) in the middle reaches of the Litani River (longest river in Lebanon). The reservoir has been used for hydropower generation (190 MW or 250,000 hp), domestic water supply, and for irrigation of 27,500 ha (68,000 acres).

The annual surface water flow in the Litani River received at Lake Qaraoun is 420×10^{6} m^{3} (15×10^{9} cu ft). This flow is used for generating hydroelectric power of 600 GWh at three hydroelectric power stations at Markaba, Awali and Jun with the total installed capacity of 190 MW (250,000 hp). During the dry season, 30×10^{6} m^{3} (1.1×10^{9} cu ft) of water is diverted from Markaba power station to meet the needs of the Kassmieh irrigation project.

The lake is a habitat for some 20,000 migratory birds which visit it annually.

== Geography ==
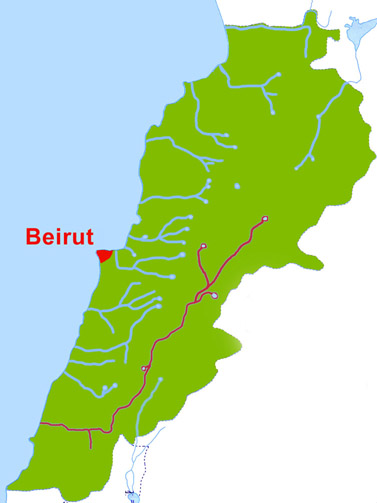
The Litani River

The upper Litani River, where the artificial lake or reservoir has been created with the dam at elevation of about 800 m (2,620 ft), is in the inland region of the Beqaa Valley, whose elevation range generally lies between 650–1,600 m (2,130–5,250 ft), with mountain peaks raising as high as 3,090 m (10,140 ft).

The Litani River drains the southern end of the Beqaa Valley plains (a continuation of the Jordan Rift Valley), crossing the southern periphery of the Mount Lebanon range and discharging into the sea north of Tyre, after traversing a length of 170 km (110 mi) entirely in Lebanon. The hydrographical system of Lebanon consisting of 40 major streams is typecast into five regions, which includes the Litani River Basin formed by the Litani River in its eastern and southern part, with the river debouching into the sea at the southwestern end. The basin has a total catchment area of 2,120 km^{2} (820 sq mi), which forms 20% area of the country, with about 1,600 km^{2} (600 sq mi) intercepted at Lake Qaraoun by the Albert Naccache Dam for providing various benefits. The artificial lake is created across the Litani River in its middle reaches. Litani River is the longest river in Lebanon at the southern end of the Beqaa valley.

The Litani River, which lies entirely within the territory of Lebanon rises near the historic city of Baalbek (now the site hardly discernible due to high rate of water extraction in this reach for pumping and ancient city development) and flows through for 170 km (110 mi) before it outlets into the Mediterranean Sea. It is one of the 40 major streams in Lebanon and is the longest from the source to the Mediterranean Sea.

The land on the periphery of the reservoir consists of agricultural lands on the eastern side where arable crops and olive orchards are seen. Grazing of sheep and goats is also noted. On the steep sloping western periphery of the lake there are fruit orchards and pasture land for grazing.

=== Geology ===
The geological formation at the dam axis and the reservoir consists of limestone, chalky marl, and alluvial deposits with semi karstic and karstic limestones both upstream of the reservoir area and along the dam axis. Marl in the reservoir area has low permeability.

=== Climate ===
The climate in the catchment of the reservoir is of continental type with 90% of rainfall occurring between November and April, with January experiencing the maximum precipitation. Snowfall is experienced at elevation above 1,500 m (4,900 ft). The rainfall incidence in the Beqaa Valley, which widely varies spatially and temporally, is an annual average of 1,500 mm (60 in) in the mountainous region of the upper valley to a low of 700 mm (30 in) in the south in the coastal region. However, the average annual rainfall is 800 mm (30 in) in the catchment area of about 1,600 km^{2} (618 sq mi) at the reservoir carted at the dam.

=== Water resources and hydroelectric power plants ===
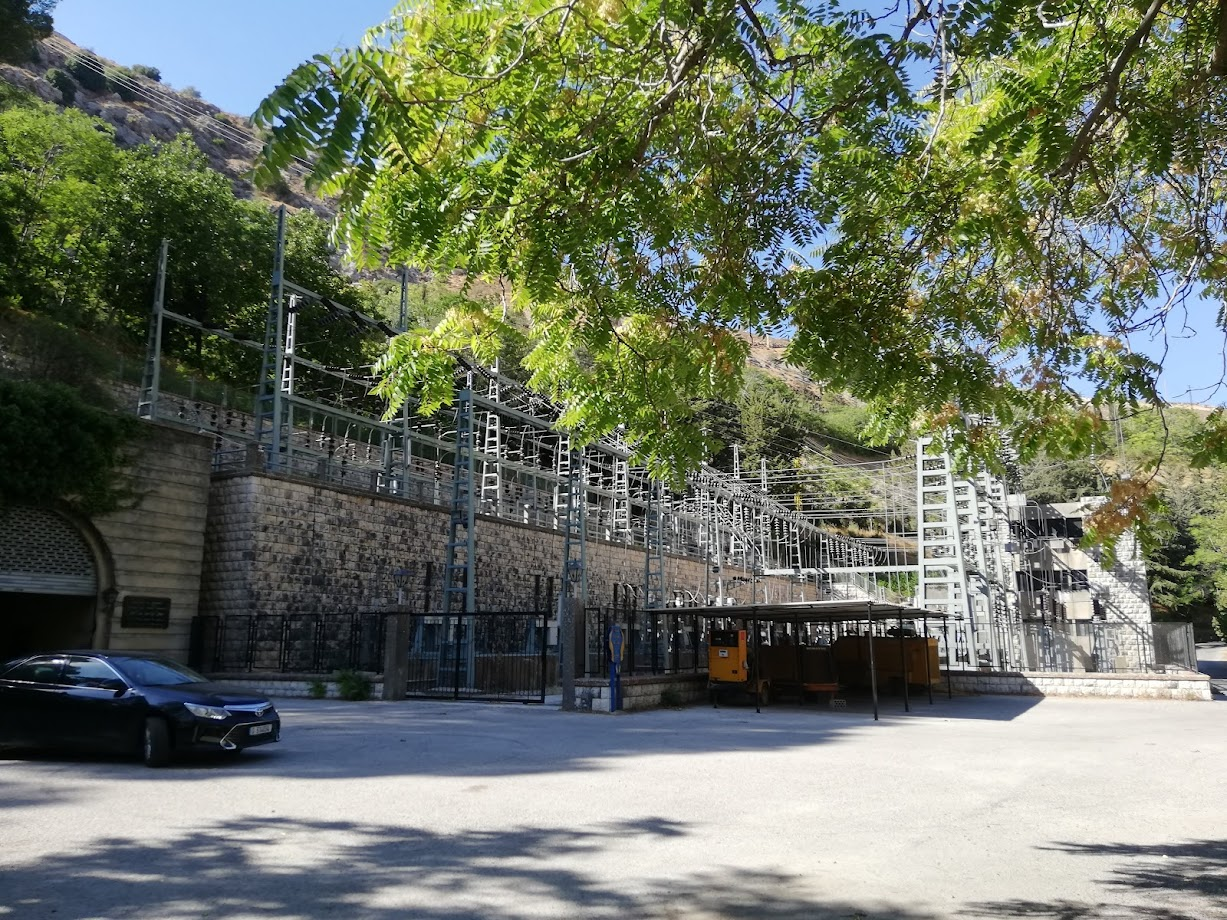
Ibrahim Abdel Al Hydroelectric power plant

According to water balance studies carried out for the Litani River, the total inflow of the river at the reservoir location has been assessed as 1,280×10^{6} m^{3} (45×10^{9} cu ft) per year, of which 60% is accounted towards aquifer recharge and evapotranspiration. Of the balance of 500×10^{6} m^{3} (18×10^{9} cu ft) per year of surface water, 80×10^{6} m^{3} (2.8×10^{9} cu ft) per year is used for various uses by pumping before the flow reaches the dam. Thus, the flow of 420×10^{6} m^{3} (15×10^{9} cu ft) is available at the reservoir, in an average year (35-year average flows from 1920s). However, in drought years, the flow could reach a low of 320×10^{6} m^{3} (11×10^{9} cu ft), as recorded in 1972–73). Based on precipitation data, the total annual flow could be as high as 320×10^{6} m^{3} (11×10^{9} cu ft). The average annual flow received at the reservoir is utilised through the dam created at the site and diverting it through a series of tunnels and ponds to generate 600 GWh of energy at three hydroelectric power stations (190 MW or 250,000 hp total installed capacity) located at Markaba, Awali and Jun. The planning done in the 1950s at the time of building the dam and the Qaraoun reservoir envisaged utilization of 800 m (2,600 ft) head available between the dam and the Mediterranean Sea through the three power stations. The river outlet at the end of the cascade of power plants is now 30 km (19 mi) to the north of its original outlet. It is also utilised for providing irrigation benefits by diverting 30×10^{6} m^{3} (1.1×10^{9} cu ft) per year of water from a channel of the Markaba power station for the Kassmieh Irrigation Project.

The Ibrahim Abdel Al hydroelectric power plant is located in Markaba in the Beqaa Governorate 11 km (6.8 mi) away from the lake and 660 m (2,170 ft) above sea level, it was established in 1962. It is the first of three hydro power stations that generate energy from the water of Lake Qaroun. The total power supply of the Ibrahim Abdel Al station is 36 MW generated by two power generation units.

The Paul Arcache hydroelectric power plant is the biggest hydroelectric plant in Lebanon, with an overall power supply of 108 MW. It is located in Al-Awwali near the Awali river 228.5 m (750 ft) above sea level. It was established in 1965. The plant also draws water from the Qaroun lake after it comes out of the Abdel Al plant through a 17 km (11 mi) tunnel where its joined by water from different springs and streams such as Ain el Zarqa and Nahr el Cheta. The tunnel crosses Jabal Niha-Jezzine into the Anane basin located above the plant at 630 m (2,070 ft) above sea level.

The Charles Helou hydroelectric power plant became operational in 1968 and located in Joun on the bank of the Awali river 32 m (105 ft) above sea level. The plant uses the water dropping from a 194 m (636 ft) altitude from the Awali basin located at the lower end of the Paul Arcache plant. The basin takes water discharged from the Paul Arcache plant and from Bisri river.

As result of this development the hydrological regime of the Litani River has been divided into two zones. The basin above the lake is known as the Upper Litani Basin (ULB), and that below the lake is called Litani's lower reaches.

== Reservoir ==
Lake Qaraoun in the Litani River Basin at Qaraoun.

The Qaraoun reservoir or lake created by Qaroun Dam on the Litani River has a water spread area of 11.9 km^{2} (5 sq mi). It is the largest artificial lake in Lebanon, located in the southern part of the fertile Beqaa Valley, with a total capacity of about 220×10^{6} m^{3} (0×10^{9} cu ft) and effective storage (live storage) of 160×10^{6} m^{3} (0×10^{9} cu ft). The power generation is a primary benefit, which meets about 7%–10% of the power requirements in Lebanon. However, the stored waters also provide irrigation benefits with flows of 140×10^{6} m^{3} (0×10^{9} cu ft), as 110 million cubic metres is used in South Lebanon and 30 million cubic metres in Beqaa, while 20×10^{6} m^{3} (0×10^{9} cu ft) is used for domestic water supply in the Southern Lebanon. Controlled reservoir operation also provides flood-control benefits and prevention of water logging in an area of about 1,500 ha (3,700 acres).

During 1999–2000, the water quality of the reservoir has been investigated from 16 sampling points on the river and its tributaries, by the Ministry of Environment and the Litani River Authority as a part of an exercise to evolve management plan for the Litani River and Lake Qaroun's catchment. It has been noted that seven sewer networks drain directly into the river. Untreated sewage from the towns of Baalbek, Houch el Rafqa, Qaa er Rim, Zahle, Chtoura, Qabb Elias, Bar Elias, Joub Jannine and Qaraoun flow into the Litani River or its tributaries, apart from industrial effluents many factories related to manufacture of sugar, paper, lead, limestone crushers, agro-industries and also from poultry farms, tanneries and slaughterhouses. The pollution is noted by the high recorded values of BOD_{5} (79 mg/L) and nitrates (1.7 mg/L) in the Litani River.

The vegetation in the periphery of the lake consists of woodland, orchards, and low-growing scrub. During water-level variations in the lake, as the stored water is utilised for various beneficial uses, no submerged or emergent vegetation have been noticed. When the water level is at its lowest in the lake, a steppe-like land slope has been noticed with low vegetation of rocky shingle terrain where flocks of larks and lapwings are seen.

The bird life in the reservoir area is very notable, as 20,000 migratory birds of species of raptors, storks, pelicans and others species of birds have been sighted. The ferruginous duck (Aythya nyroca), pallid harrier (Circus macrourus), greater spotted eagle (Aquila clanga), eastern imperial eagle (Aquila heliaca) and sociable lapwing (Vanellus gregarius) are some of the birds which are of conservation concern, according to the 2008 IUCN Red List.

== Albert Naccache Dam ==
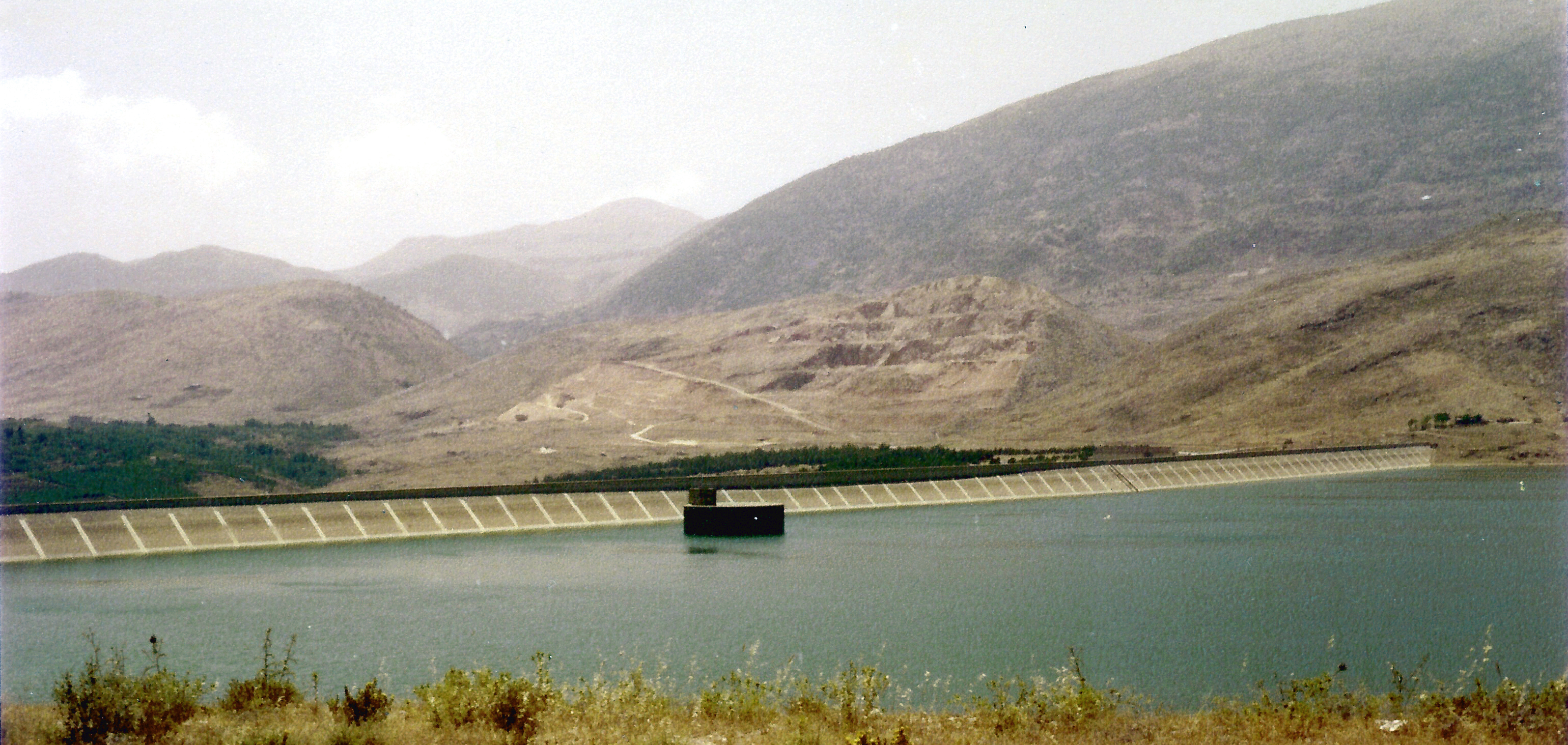
Full view of Albert Naccache Dam and Lake Qaraoun.

The Albert Naccache Dam, built in the middle reaches of the Litani River, has created an artificial lake at (33°34′21″N 35°41′51″E) with water-spread area of 1,190 ha (2,940 acres). It is situated about 70 km (43 mi) downstream of the historic city of Baalbek. The dam had been under planning since 1964. The Qaraoun village transferred a land area of 760 ha (1,878 acres) for building the dam. The dam, which created the artificial lake or reservoir, is the largest dam built in Lebanon for multipurpose uses of hydropower generation (190 MW), irrigation of 28,500 ha (70,425 acres), and drinking-water supply. It is a concrete-faced rockfill dam (CFRD) of 61 m (200 ft) height built with crest level at elevation 801 m (2,628 ft), with a dam length of 1,090 m (3,576 ft), over karstic limestone formations. The reservoir has a storage capacity of 220×10^{6} m^{3} (0×10^{9} cu ft) at a maximum pond elevation of 858 m (2,815 ft). The High Flood Level (HFL) in the reservoir is 862 m (2,828 ft), where the area of the lake is 12.6 km^{2} (5 sq mi). The average water level for power generation is 835 m (2,740 ft), with the lowest level or the minimum draw-down level as 827 m (2,713 ft).

The dam's upstream face is a concrete face of 47,000 m^{2} (506,000 sq ft) area, with thickness of concrete face varying from 50 cm (1.6 ft) at the bottom to 30 cm (1.0 ft) at the top. The spillway of the dam is designed for an inflow flood discharge of 450×10^{6} m^{3} (0×10^{9} cu ft). The reservoir has a storage capacity of 220×10^{6} m^{3} (0×10^{9} cu ft) at maximum pond elevation of 858 m (2,815 ft).

== Future developments ==
The lake water is proposed to be integrated with a pumped-storage scheme planned under the "Qaraoun Lake-Marj et Taouil: Project". The plan is to utilise the water stored in this reservoir to be pumped to an upper reservoir, with a 50.6 m-high (166 ft) dam at maximum water level of 1,679 m (5,509 ft) to store water pumped from the Qaraoun Lake or reservoir) to maximize power generation during the daily lean period (off-peak hours) of power generation when load demand is low. In this mode of generation, the pumping will require 560 MW (750,000 hp), that would result in a generation of 388 MW (520,000 hp) of power.

== Archaeology ==
The archaeological site of Ain Jaouze overlooks Lake Qaraoun at the foot of Jebel Baruk on the west of the road from Chtaura to Jezzine. Jesuit archaeologist, Auguste Bergy collected flints from the surface of this site, suggested to be similar to those of later neolithic Byblos.

== Visitor attractions ==
On the western periphery of the lake there are many restaurants and hotels which are popular during late spring and summer. During this time many large boats operate in the lake for lake viewing and also for fishing. In winter, when water level in the lake is high boats are operated to hunt for of birds such as wildfowl, mainly storks, heron, egrets and lark species.
