= Khallet el Hamra =

Ravine and archaeological site in Lebanon

- Khallet Hamra
- Location within Lebanon
- 33.1206°N 35.3008°E
- Periods: Heavy Neolithic, Acheulean
- Cultures: Qaraoun culture
- Location: 1 kilometre (0.62 mi) southeast of Ain Ebel, Lebanon
- Region: Nabatieh Governorate

Site notes
- Archaeologists: Paul Bovier-Lapierre, Henri Fleisch
- Public access: Yes

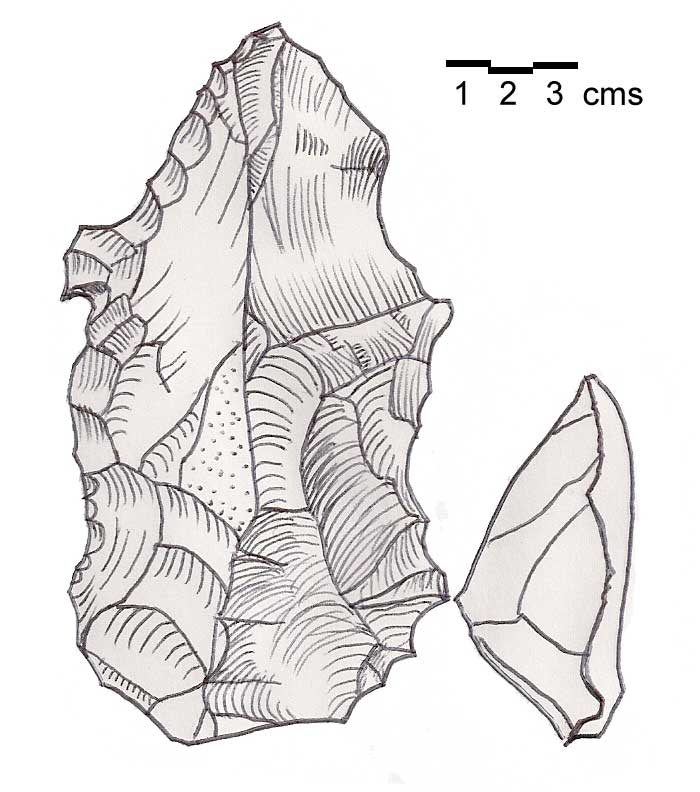
Heavy Neolithic tools of the Qaraoun culture found at Mtaileb I - Massive nosed scraper on a flake with irregular jagged edges, notches and "noses". Light grey and streaky silicious limestone.

Khallet el Hamra or Khallet Hamra is a ravine or wadi joining the larger Wadi Yaroun located 1 kilometre (0.62 mi) southeast of Ain Ebelin the Bint Jbeil District of Nabatieh Governorate in Lebanon.

A Heavy Neolithic archaeological site associated with the Qaraoun culture was discovered in 1908 by jesuit archaeologist Paul Bovier-Lapierre. It was located to the south of a track that leads from Ain Ebel to Bint Jbeil at around 700 metres (2,300 ft) above sea level. Bovier-Lapierre considered several of the axes found to be Chellean with one exceptionally large and finely made Acheulean chopper. Henri Fleisch re-evaluated the materials in light of more modern studies and noted the finds to be only sparsely Acheulean with the assemblage consisting of predominantly "abundant" Heavy Neolithic tools of the Qaraoun culture.
