= Ain Ebel =

Village in Nabatieh Governorate of Lebanon

Ain Ebel عين إبل (Arabic)
- Municipality
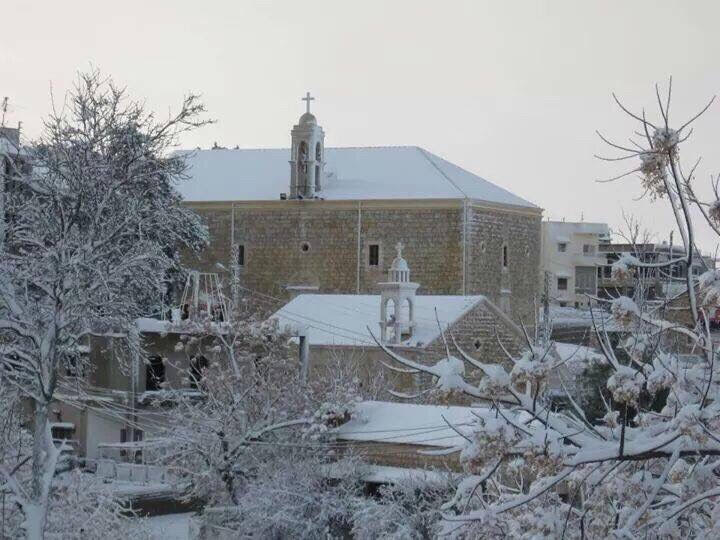
- Snowy day in Ain Ebel, with Our Lady of Ain Ebel and St. Elias churches in the background

- Location within Lebanon
- Coordinates: 33°06′35″N 35°24′10″E
- Grid position: 187/279 PAL
- Country: Lebanon
- Governorate: Nabatieh Governorate
- District: Bint Jbeil District
- Established: 1400s
- Founder: Maronite Christians

Government
  - Type: 15 Member Municipal Council
  - Body: Municipal Council
  - Mayor: Ayoub Khreish (Ind.)

Area
  - Total: 13.60 km^{2} (5.25 sq mi)
- Highest elevation: 850 m (2,790 ft)
- Lowest elevation: 750 m (2,460 ft)

Population
  - Total: 1,500−2,000; 3,500+ Summer Period
  - Density: 130/km^{2} (340/sq mi)
- Time zone: UTC+2 (EET)
  - Summer (DST): UTC+3 (EEST)
- Dialing code: +961
- Patron Saint: St. Mary

Ain Ebel (Arabic: عين إبل) is a municipality in the Nabatieh Governorate, about 90 kilometers (56 miles) south of Beirut. Its inhabitants are predominantly Christian.

== Etymology ==
Due to the Syriac heritage of the village, the most likely meaning of its name comes from Aramaic. Historians and etymologists attest to its Aramaic origin, explaining that the village’s name combines two Aramaic roots: Aon, the god of fertility, and Abel, the god of creation. Other interpretations suggest that Ebel may derive from Baal (Syriac: ܒܥܠ), the Semitic god of rain and land fertility, in which case the combined name could mean Spring of Fruitfulness or Abundance. Historian Joseph Toufik Khoreich explains the name as “Spring of the Monk,” noting that in Syriac, a dialect of Aramaic, Ain (ܥܝܢ) means spring and Ebel (ܐܒܠ) refers to a hermit or monk.Edward Henry Palmer offered a more literal, but less likely, reading from classical Arabic, translating it as “Spring of Camels,” which is historically and geographically implausible, as camels were neither raised in the village nor native to the Levant.

The name appears in several variant spellings, including Ainebel, Aïn Ebel, Ain Ebl, Ain Ibl, Ayn Ibil, Ain Ibil, Aïn Ibel, and Ain Ibel.

== Demographics ==
The people of Ain Ebel are predominantly Maronite Catholics, with a large community of Greek Catholics and a smaller one of Armenian Catholics In 2009, there were 410 members of the Saint-Élie parish of the Melkite Church in the village. In 2014 Christians made up 99.05% of registered voters in Ain Ebel, with 79.83% of the voters were Maronite Catholics and 15.39% were Greek Catholics.

== History ==
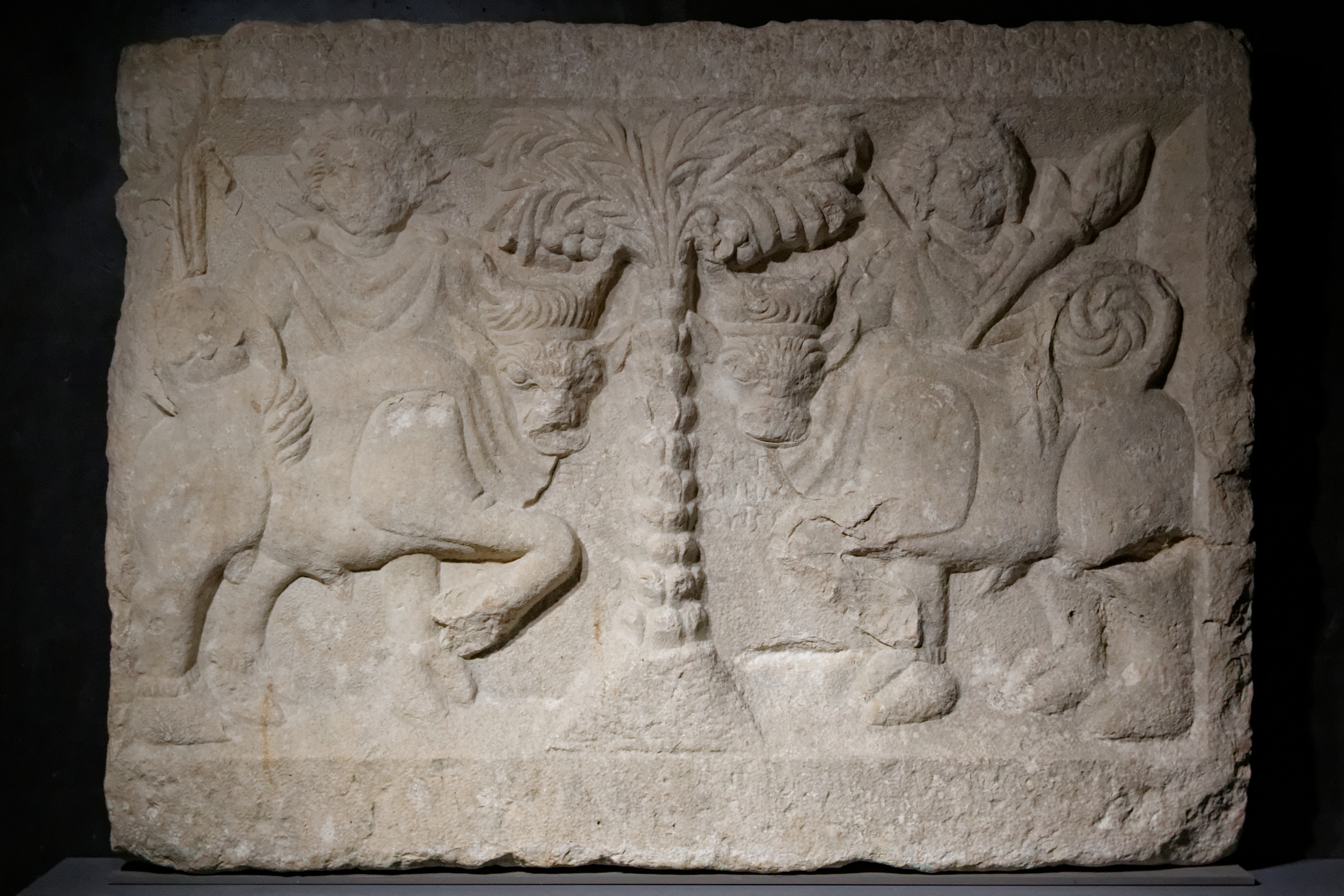
Relief with Apollo and Artemis, Louvre, found at Kh ed Doueir, just north of Ain Ebel

Ain Ebel is a historic village with numerous archaeological sites.

=== Prehistory ===
Lower Paleolithic implements found in Ain Ebel attest to the region being inhabited in prehistoric times. A Heavy Neolithic site of the Qaraoun culture was discovered by Henri Fleisch west of Ain Ebel in the Wadi Koura, with tools suggesting use by forest dwellers at the start of the Neolithic Revolution. A wide range of blades, scrapers, discs, and other tools was unearthed in Wadi Yaroun, the riverbed southeast of the village, and later preserved at Saint Joseph University (now the Museum of Lebanese Prehistory). The region stretching from north of Ain Ebel at Chalaaboun to Khallet el Hamra, the ravine or wadi, which joins the larger Wadi Yaroun is rich in flint instruments, and the whole surrounding region as far as Jish contains megalithic ruins, perhaps pre-Canaanite.

=== Ancient history ===
In the Babylonian Talmud, Ain Ebel is referred to as 'En Bol, a village northwest of Safed, in a rabbinic discussion of the practice of baby girls undergoing ritual immersion prior to the immersion of the mother.

Historian John T. Durward argues that Ain Ebel, located west of Kedesh of Naphtali (an ancient town documented in Judges 4:6, 10), is probably the biblical town of Abel Beth Ma'acah, and was the spiritual retreat of the clergy from Tyre and Acre.

On the outskirts of the village is an area called Chalaboune where Ernest Renan, a French historian and philosopher who was sent by Emperor Napoleon III to Lebanon, found ancient graves. According to Renan, Ain-Ebel had beautiful underground passages and large buildings in colossal stones and admirable carved sarcophagi in two remarkable places, Douair and Chalaboune, which he believed was the Biblical town of Shaalabbin of the Tribe of Dan. On one of the graves, Renan discovered a bas-relief of Apollo and Artemis. The relief was transported to France where it remains today at the Louvre. In 2011 and after months of negotiation, the Musée du Louvre agreed to make an exact replica of the bas-relief, which was delivered to the municipality of Ain Ebel in November.

=== Early Christianity ===
In antiquity, the goddess Astarte was venerated by the region’s inhabitants; over time, this cult gradually gave way to that of the Virgin, who is today the village’s patron saint.

The village was strategically located on the route linking Tyre, Haifa, and Damascus, and very likely lay on the path of the apostles during their journeys of evangelization. It is also believed by some historians that the village lay along the route Jesus may have taken on his journey to Sidon. Local traditions, supported by some historians, suggest that after leaving Capernaum, Jesus Christ may have passed through Ain Ebel on his way to Cana and Tyre. This belief is reinforced by physical traces linked to these oral accounts, including a spring known as “Ain El Massih” (the Spring of Christ).

=== Middle Ages ===
In his book Salut Jérusalem: Les mémoires d’un chrétien de Tyr à l’époque des Croisades, the Lebanese historian Bechara Menassa notes that the inhabitants of Ain Ebel maintained contact with the Crusaders in Toron, modern Tebnine. Menassa described how a Frankish monk killed a wild animal in Ain Ebel, providing evidence that the village existed at least as early as the 12th century.

After the Mamluk conquest of Acre and the fall of nearby coastal cities, such as Tyre and Sidon, Christian presence in the Upper Galilee was largely eradicated. Mamluk policy aimed to prevent any future Crusader resurgence, resulting in the systematic destruction of many native Christian villages. Nevertheless, small and isolated Christian communities managed to persist in inland towns; however, since Toron was a Crusader stronghold, survival of nearby Christian communities was unlikely. Although it is unclear whether Ain Ebel survived the Mamluk conquest, evidence suggests that it has been continuously inhabited since at least the 16th century, when Christian communities from northern Lebanon migrated to the southern lowlands to cultivate feudal lands. The main migration period took place during the reign of Fakhr al-Din II, who, through alliances with the Maronites, is credited with unifying much of present-day Lebanon for the first time.

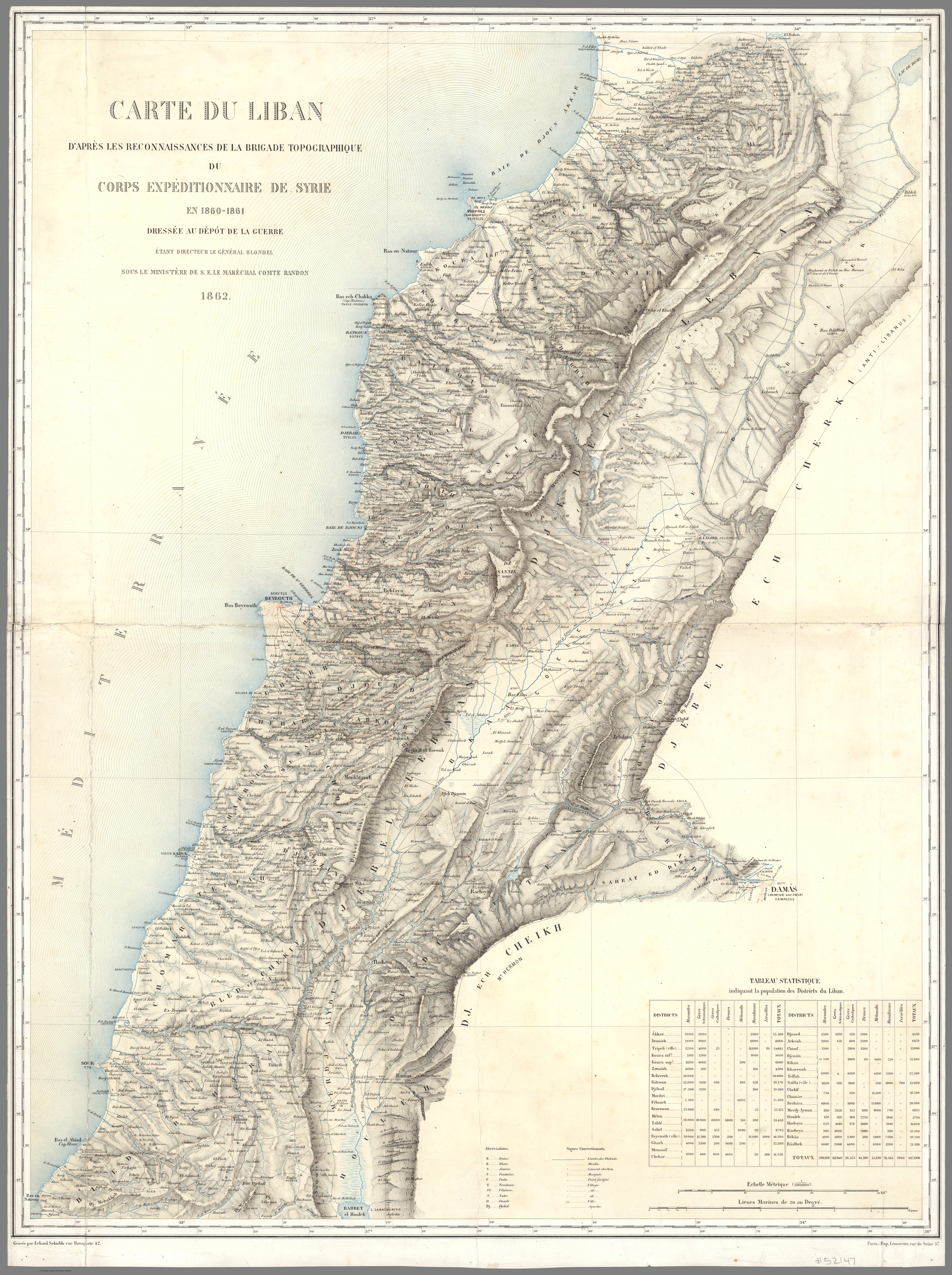
Ain Ebel appearing in an 1862 map drawn by the French expedition of Beaufort d'Hautpoul.

, later used as a template for the 1920 borders of Greater Lebanon.

=== Ottoman period ===
Under Ottoman rule in Jabal Amel, which lasted from 1516 to 1918, life for Christians in places like Ain Ebel, while shaped by their status as protected ‘dhimmi’ communities, was still harsh, marked by heavy taxation and periodic military repression, though they were less frequently subjected to the punitive campaigns that affected the neighboring Shia population.

Life during this period was marked by extreme poverty, civil unrest, and frequent plundering. As a result, the village was built with houses closely clustered together, since any dwelling set apart would invite pillage. Inhabitants often lived alongside their animals in homes consisting of a single large room with two levels: the higher level was reserved for people, while the lower level housed animals brought inside at night for protection. The inhabitants relied on well water and collected rainwater during this period, with their main crops including wheat, beans, and fruit.

In January 1837, Ain Ebel was hit by the Galilee earthquake, which devastated the South all the way to Safad and Tiberias.

By the mid-nineteenth century, Ain Ebel had become the principal village of Christianity in the Upper Galilee, and in 1861 it was chosen for the first religious retreat organized in the Holy Land where 55 priests from the archdioceses of Tyre and Acre gathered for a reunion.

Ain Ebel is mentioned in a Christian anthology, containing contributions from ministers and members of various evangelical denominations published in the United Kingdom in 1866:

Forwards we marched, with light spirits, through close woods, varied by occasional clearings, like what are called the 'rides' in old English forests; and sometimes we arrived at snug villages or prospects of such by the names of Teereh, Hhaneen and Ain Ibil, the latter at two hours from Tibneen. The people are Christians, and they cultivate silk and tobacco... A poor Maronite priest in his black robes and dark blue turban, came up to me, and, leaning on his staff, represented the sad story of his village (Ain Nebel) the day before, when of the subordinate officers of Tamar Bek, going round to inspect the Christians in their compulsory and unpaid labour at the lime-kilns, and finding the work of one of the men not equal to the task exacted, shot him dead on the spot.

— Johnstone, John, "Byeways in Palestine by a British Consul, Upper Galilee, Forest Scenery", page 188, The Christian Treasury, Volume 22 (1866)

In 1875 Victor Guérin visited, and noted 800 Maronite and 200 Greek Orthodox villagers.

In 1881, the PEF's Survey of Western Palestine (SWP) described Ain Ebel as a well-built, modern village with a Christian chapel, a population of about 1,000 Christians—comprising 800 Maronites and 200 Greek Catholics—with vineyards covering the slopes of the hill on which the village stood and olive trees growing in the valley below, adding that the village enjoyed a good water supply from springs in the valley.

P. Engbert writes that the inhabitants of Ain Ebel offered the Jesuits in 1888 a fairly large lot of land after almost all the inhabitants signed the petition which was presented to R. P. Lefebvre.

In 1889, the village suffered a poor harvest, and an epidemic swept through the population, lasting all winter and claiming more than fifty lives.

By the turn of the 20th century, the village had become a center for education, with Catholic missionaries such as Reverend Armand de Villeneuve S.J. establishing it as a base, serving not only the town but also neighboring Christian villages like Debel and Rmaish, as well as Kafr Bir'im, Jish, and Mi'ilya, with the latter three later either forcibly depopulated or brought under the control of Israel.

The first recorded presence of a medical facility in the village dates back to 1909, when Dr. Suleiman Effendi Hajj established Ain Ebel as his base of operations for five years, during which he helped the local population become more receptive to doctors, raised awareness about microbes, promoted health practices, emphasized infection prevention, and provided care for both the elderly and children.

=== French Mandate ===
World War I in southern Lebanon was marked by severe hardship under the Ottoman Empire, as famine, requisitions, and conscription caused widespread suffering and loss of life. With the end of the war and the collapse of four centuries of Ottoman rule, the people in Ain Ebel, like in other villages in the country, celebrated the arrival of the High Commissioner Gouraud to Lebanon by flying the flag of France and playing the French anthem.

During the French Mandate, the network of paved road expanded, coinciding with the introduction of automobiles in Lebanon. The arrival of the first car in a village became a celebratory event, and this was true in Ain Ebel, where the inhabitants, dressed in their Sunday best, gathered in the church square to welcome the first car to drive through the village. The French planned to build an automobile road to connect the southern villages with those of Mandatory Palestine. The original plan was to build the road from Bint Jbeil via Yaroun and Rmaich, but the people of Ain Ebel protested, knowing the significance of such a road for the development of their town, and in the end, they were able to convince the French government to change the plan and have the road run through the village.

==== Massacre of 1920 ====
By 1920, Ain Ebel had a population of 1,500, living in about 300 houses.

While delegates from the Shia Conference of El-Hujair were in Damascus swearing allegiance to King Faisal, an act the Maronites of Jabal Amel considered threatening, a Shia gang led by Mahmoud Bazzi, which "proceeded from brigandage to confronting France and its Christian friends in the south", attacked Ain Ebel on 5 May 1920, pillaging and killing more than 50 people. It appears that the gangs responded to a call for jihad. The people of Ain Ebel defended the town from sunrise to sunset until they ran out of ammunition.

A contemporary Franciscan document chronicling the event states that attackers abandoned themselves in the violence, massacring children in the arms of their parents before killing them, raping young women and then killing them, and burning people who were still alive. The survivors fled south to Haifa until French ships took them back to Tyre where General Gouraud promised the Maronite Patriarch to punish those who had caused the massacres and destruction. The town was completely destroyed, and the damage done to the two churches, school and convent, were evidence of sectarian malice. The neighboring villages of Debel and Rmaich were also attacked so after 12 days of plundering and massacres, the French arrived and suppressed all activities in Jabal Amil region.

While awaiting to return to their village, it was reported that a soldier, in the service of the English, offered the villagers to sell their properties to the Zionists because they were not guaranteed a return to Ain Ebel, but they all refused. This was yet another example of how the Christians of the Tyre district were under a lot of pressure to abandon their land and emigrate out of the area. The massacres hardened Maronite opinion in favor of Jabal Amil being part of Greater Lebanon, which borders were cemented at the San Remo conference in 1920.

By 1921, although the village’s homes and churches had been repaired and rebuilt, the massacre had triggered a wave of emigration to the Americas, reducing the population to around 1,000 inhabitants, of whom approximately 200 were Greek Catholics and the remainder Maronites.

==== World War II ====
During World War II, the Vichy French had a line of widely spaced blockhouses that stretched from the coast to the inland heights, reaching Ain Ebel. During the Syria–Lebanon Campaign to liberate Lebanon and Syria from the Vichy, Australian Captain Douglas George Horley was ordered to clear Ain Ebel. Australian Brigadier J. E. S. Stevens decided that he would seize Aitaroun, Bint Jbel, Ain Ebel, Yaroun, Rmaich, Ayta ash Shab, Ramié, Jereine, Aalma ech Chaab and Labouna to cut a road from Al-Malkiyya to the French frontier road so as to make a second gateway into the coastal zone. The Australian squad, guided by Meir Davidson's squad, finally captured the town of Bint Jbeil and the villages of Aitaroun and Ain Ebel. After taking Yaroun and Bint Jbeil, Ain Ebel was found to have been abandoned by the Vichy.

=== Independence period ===
In October 1948, during the 1948 Arab–Israeli War, Ain Ebel received Palestinian refugees, especially from the village of Eilabun via Meiron, who stayed in the church for three days before being relocated to the Mieh Mieh refugee camp. By late October and early November, refugees from the Palestinian village of Al-Mansura also sought refuge in Ain Ebel and Rmaish.

In 1958, while carrying out a security mission in Arsal, First Lieutenant Benoît Barakat of the Lebanese Army, one of the sons of Ain Ebel, was killed after his armored vehicle fell into an ambush set for him and the patrol members by local gangs in that area. An army barracks in the coastal city of Tyre bears his name, as does a street in Beirut’s Badaro district.

In the late 1960s and early 1970s, the village was often caught in the skirmishes between the Palestine Liberation Organization and the Israel Defense Force. The PLO imposed a food and fuel blockade on Christian villages, such as Ain Ebel and Qlaiaa, forcing the inhabitants to deal with Israel. Christian militia arrived in Ain Ebel and neighboring Christian villages in August 1976 to open a new line of confrontation against the PLO strongholds in neighboring villages.

Ain-Ebel native, Monsignor Albert Khreish was abducted from his home on 24 April 1988. A week later on 1 May 1988, Monsignor Albert Khreish, who was head of the Maronite Spiritual Affairs Court, and nephew of Cardinal Anthony Peter Khoraish, was found dead in the pine forest outside of Ghazir. Khreish, who was shot 30 times, was an authority on international law and had served on the Maronite religious tribunal and lectured at the Government-run Lebanese University. His death was believed to be politically motivated, but the case was unsolved.

==== Civil War ====
In the 1960s and 1970s, and especially after the Cairo Agreement, Palestinian guerrilla groups based in southern Lebanon used the border region as a base for attacks into northern Israel, often provoking Israeli retaliatory strikes that inflicted damage and casualties across Lebanese border communities. Ain Ebel and other boarder towns were directly affected by fighting between the PLO and Israeli forces, being “caught in skirmishes” between them. Inter-sectarian fighting did not spread from Beirut in 1975 and coexistence in southern Lebanon largely persisted, though the military activities of Palestine Liberation Organization (PLO) guerrillas in border towns created tension.

In the summer of 1976, after several Israeli retaliatory raids, residents of Ain Ebel refused to allow guerrilla groups to use the village as a base for cross-border attacks into Israel, leading to clashes that resulted in the deaths of three residents.

==== Israeli Occupation ====
Ain Ebel, along with the rest of southern Lebanon, came under Israeli occupation following Israel’s March 1978 invasion up to the Litani River.

==== 2006 Hezbollah-Israel war ====
In July 2006, Ain Ebel, like other villages that string Lebanon's southern border, such as Debel, Qaouzah, Rmaich, and Yaroun, was caught in the 2006 Lebanon War between Lebanon and Israel. The village and its surrounding valleys were attacked by Israël . During the conflict, the village witnessed ferocious battles with missiles destroying many houses and orchards and leaving the townspeople besieged and without bread for three weeks.

After allegations that Hezbollah was using humans as shields, the Human Rights Watch visited Ain Ebel on several occasions, and concluded that "Hezbollah violated the prohibition against unnecessarily endangering civilians when they took over civilian homes in the populated village, fired rockets close to homes, and drove through the village in at least one instance with weapons in their cars". On the other hand, Human Rights Watch found that Israeli forces have consistently launched artillery and air attacks with limited or dubious military gain but excessive civilian cost. In dozens of attacks, Israeli forces struck an area with no apparent military target. In some cases, the timing and intensity of the attack, the absence of a military target, as well as return strikes on rescuers, suggest that Israeli forces deliberately targeted civilians. Residents of Ein Abel informed Human Rights Watch investigators that Hezbollah had declared several fields "off limits" to the locals following the Israeli withdrawal in 2000, later using these areas to construct military installations.

==== Operation Nahr el-Bared ====
While Ain Ebel lay far from the fighting and was not affected by the Lebanese Army’s operation at the Nahr al-Bared refugee camp in the north, it still took a heavy toll on the town. Ain Ebel–born Colonel Ibrahim Salloum, the head of the unit involved, was wounded twice but refused to leave the battlefield, ultimately succumbing to a fatal gunshot.

==== Death of Elias Hasrouni ====
Elias Hasrouni, a veteran Lebanese Forces official, was first thought to have died in a car crash on Sunday, 6 August 2023, but an autopsy later revealed that he was killed and many, including Samir Geagea, believed the murder was politically motivated. Samir Geagea declared Hasrouni's death an assassination, pointing the finger at Hezbollah and its assassination squad, Unit 121, as the crime occurred deep within areas controlled by them but that accusation was never proven . Politician Samy Gemayel also hinted that Hezbollah might have been behind the killing. The residents of Ain Ebel, one of the few Christian villages in the predominately Shiite province, one of Hezbollah's main power bases, are mostly supportive of Hezbollah's largest political ennemy, the Lebanese Forces, and the murder of Hasrouni created sectarian tentions. Two months later, Hasrouni's wife, Yvette Sleiman died in a car accident, but it was unclear whether her death was also politically motivated.

==== 2023-2024 Hezbollah-Israel war ====
Ain Ebel, about 7.5 km (4.7 mi) from the border with Israel, was caught in the crossfire during the 2023-2024 Hezbollah-Israel conflict, and the 2024 Israeli invasion of Lebanon. While the village, like other neighboring Christian villages, was not aligned to Hezbollah, Israeli attacks led some villagers, especially the women and children, to evacuate to Beirut. Only 40% of the population, mostly adult men, remained in the village. Sister Maya El Beaino, a member of the Sisters of the Sacred Hearts of Jesus and Mary, chose to remain at the convent in Ain Ebel to support the 9,000 Christians across three villages and the region’s only Catholic school, which served 32 villages, amid ongoing violence that disrupted education.

While the village’s schools initially remained open at the onset of the war, they were forced to close after three students were killed in an Israeli strike on November 5 while traveling from Aitaroun to Ain Ebel. On 23 November 2023, several rockets launched by Hezbollah toward Israel hit Ain Ebel. As residents prepared for a subdued Christmas under the shadow of the ongoing conflict, United Nations peacekeeping handed out toys on Saturday, 23 December to some 250 children whose families had remained in Ain Ebel and in the nearby villages of Rmaich and Debel. On 7 September 2024, a drone crashed in the Ain Ebel area, prompting the Lebanese army's engineering team to conduct an inspection. On 1 October 2024, the Israeli army issued a call for the evacuation of residents from 23 villages in southern Lebanon, including Ain Ebel. At least 800 people from Ain Ebel sought refuge in the border town of Rmeish on 2 October 2024, where they stayed until the papal nuncio and the patriarchate coordinated an evacuation to Beirut that was escorted by the Lebanese army.

Three weeks after the ceasefire took effect on 27 November to end the conflict between Israel and Hezbollah, villagers from southern Lebanon, including the people of Ain Ebel, started to return to their homes.

On April 16, 2024, the Israeli military reported that Ismail Baz, the commander of Hezbollah's coastal sector, was killed in a strike on his vehicle near Ain Ebel.

==== 2026 Hezbollah-Israel war ====
On March 2, 2026, and on the same day that Prime Minister Nawaf Salam declared Hezbollah’s military and security activities illegal, the town was once again caught in the midst of a regional war when Hezbollah, the Iranian-allied proxy in Lebanon, launched strikes on Israel in response to the killing of Iranian supreme leader Ali Khamenei.

The residents of Ain Ebel, along with those of Rmaish and Debel, openly defied widespread Israeli evacuation and displacement orders, leaving these towns among the last remaining populated areas in the province.

On March 3, 2026, the Lebanese Army pulled back from seven positions set up in January 2026 in southern Lebanon, relocating troops from forward posts along the Israeli border to other sites, including Aita al-Shaab, Al-Qawzah, Debel, Ramya, Ain Ebel, and Rmaish.

An Israeli airstrike targeting the village's outskirts on March 12, 2026, killed three men: Chadi Tony Ammar, Elie Atallah, and Georges Pierre Khraish. Reports say the three young men were repairing a rooftop cable to restore internet access.

On March 16, the Apostolic Nuncio to Lebanon, Archbishop Paolo Borgia, visited Ain Ebel, as well as Rmaish and Debel, to deliver humanitarian aid and convey a message of solidarity from Pope Leo XIV.

On March 24, 2026, an Israeli drone strike targeted the residence of local teacher Georges Antonios Khraish, destroying it; however, family members on the ground floor survived unharmed.

On March 31, 2026, the remaining personnel of the Lebanese Armed Forces withdrew from Ain Ebel and Rmaish.

As the Israeli military advanced into southern Lebanon to establish control of territory up to the Litani River, including seizing or damaging key bridges and disrupting major crossing points, travel routes were cut off, leaving villages like Ain Ebel with severely restricted access to the capital and beyond. Fearing shortages and a prolonged conflict, the municipality of Ain Ebel, led by Mayor Ayoub Khreish, stocked sufficient fuel, food, and medicine to sustain the village for two months.

Fierce Israeli strikes against Hezbollah positions around Ain Ebel, Rmaish, and Debel severely restricted movement in the area, with travel between the villages requiring coordination with the Lebanese Armed Forces or the United Nations Interim Force in Lebanon (UNIFIL), although UN and Lebanese officials were often unable to “deconflict” individual civilian movements without an international mechanism involving the United States, France, and Israel. By early summer 2026, the village, whose residents had remained throughout the war, had largely escaped the destruction that devastated neighboring Shiite communities but remained isolated by fighting and Israeli checkpoints, relying for survival on carefully coordinated aid convoys organized by groups such as the Order of Malta, a Catholic lay organization. The village remained entirely cut off from the rest of the country under Israeli occupation.

Despite the U.S.-brokered framework agreement of June 26, 2026, outlining Israeli withdrawal, border security, and Hezbollah's disarmament, Ain Ebel remained isolated due to continued military operations and movement restrictions, while the failure of its primary borehole worsened water scarcity and access to emergency and hospital care remained critically limited.

When Benjamin Netanyahu claimed that Christian villages in Lebanon had sought annexation by Israel, a delegation from Ain Ebel met with Prime Minister Nawaf Salam on July 8, 2026, categorically rejecting the claim; Prime Minister Salam praised their resilience and reaffirmed their deep attachment to their land and identity.

== Geography ==
Located in the mountainous region of southern Lebanon, known as Belad Bechara in Jabal Amel, or the Lebanese Upper Galilee, Ain Ebel occupies several hills with elevation ranging from 750 to 850 meters above sea level. There are three natural springs in Ain Ebel, including Tarabnine, Tahta and Hourrié, and in the valley between Ain Ebel and Hanine is Ain Hanine.

=== Agriculture ===
Agriculture in the region depends heavily on rainfall and is primarily rain-fed. The main agricultural products are olives, almonds, chestnuts, pecans, figs, pomegranates, apples, and grapes.

=== Climate ===
The village has a Mediterranean climate and enjoys four seasons with autumn and spring being mild but rainy, winter being cold and sometimes snowy and summer being dry and very pleasant with average temperatures between 25–27 °C (77–81 °F). Although the elevation is relatively modest compared to other regions of Lebanon, the climate is not notably warm, as winds blow from multiple directions throughout the year.

Temperature in Ain Ebel is rarely below 1°C (34°F) or above 30°C (86°F):

Climate chart (precipitation, max. and min. temperature)
J	F	M	A	M	J	J	A	S	O	N	D
185 8 3	83 9 5	49 14 7	17 18 10	20 24 14	1 24 14	1 25 16	1 27 18	3 26 17	20 25 15	91 21 11	125 13 6
- █ Average max. and min. temperatures in °C
- █ Precipitation totals in mm
Imperial conversion
J	F	M	A	M	J	J	A	S	O	N	D
7.3 46 37	3.3 48 41	1.9 57 45	0.7 64 50	0.8 75 57	0 75 57	0 77 61	0 81 64	0.1 79 63	0.8 77 59	3.6 70 52	4.9 55 43
- █ Average max. and min. temperatures in °F
- █ Precipitation totals in inches

=== Geology ===
Deposits of bitumen, a black mixture of hydrocarbons obtained naturally, is found in Ain Ebel. Flint is also found; it was excavated and used to build tools by ancient dwellers of the region.

=== Natural Vegetation ===
Natural vegetation includes evergreen oaks and typical Mediterranean shrubland, such as anagyris foetida.

After the war in 2006, Ain Ebel was included in a field survey conducted by the Ministry of Agriculture and the Association for Forest Development and Conservation (AFDC), which documented several forest fire sites in southern Lebanon. The fires were attributed to causes including direct bombing, the ignition of fires by fallen flares, and deliberate acts of land burning.

In January 2023, perennial oak trees were illegally cut down in the western woods of the town, and while the culprit, a resident of Ayta ash Shab, was arrested, he was believed to be close to Hezbollah and was eventually released by a decision from the Nabatieh Public Prosecutor.

In the 2023 Lebanon-Israel border conflict, the Israeli army conducted airstrikes on the forest areas between Ain Ebel and Bint Jbeil. Additionally, Israel's use of white phosphorus and other incendiary weapons burned tens of thousands of olive trees and other crops in the border area.

== Education ==
There are three schools in the village: two private schools (Saints-Cœurs and Saint Joseph) and one public school. Of the three, the oldest is Saints-Cœurs, which was established by the Jesuits in 1881.

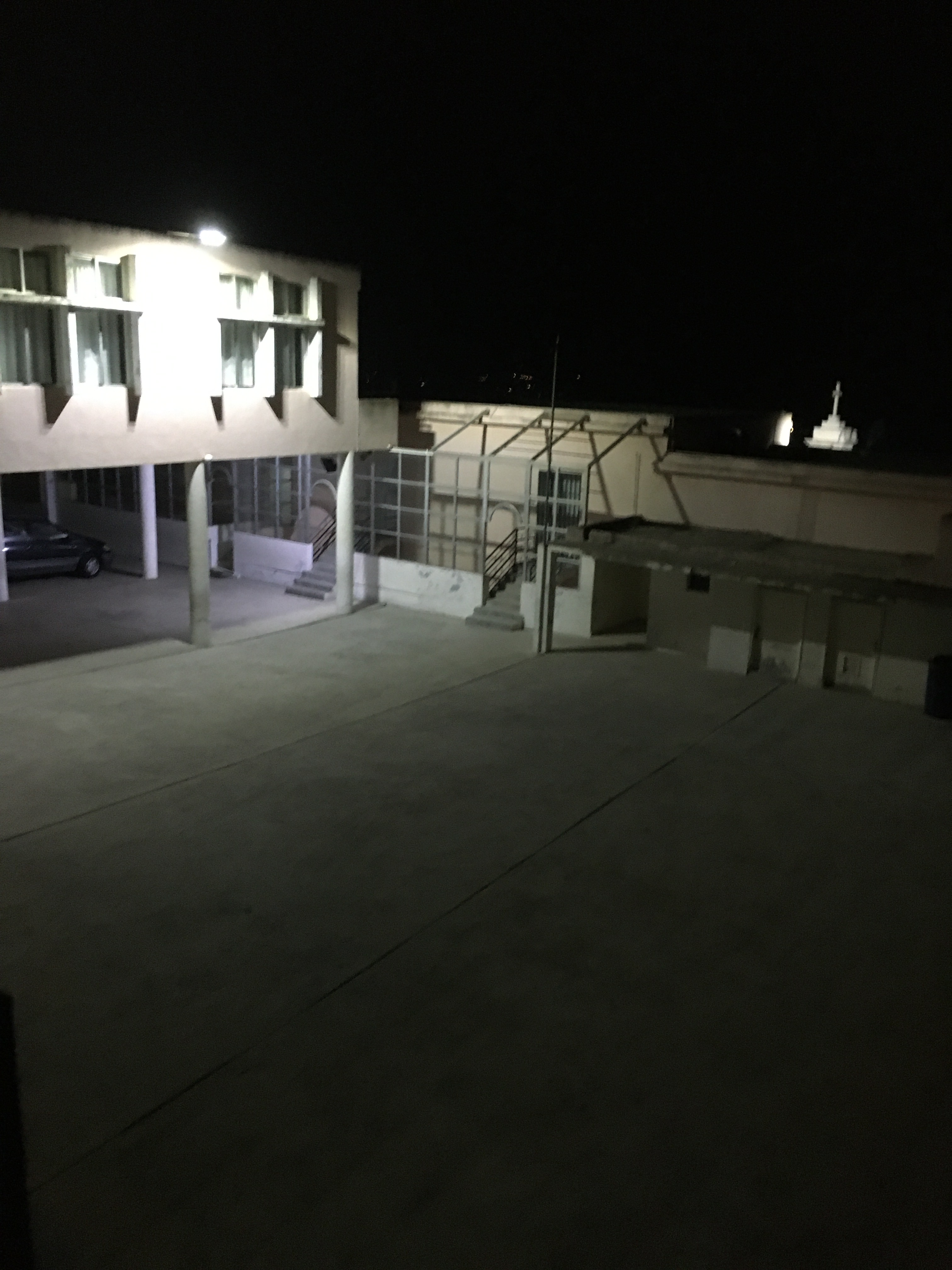
Saint Joseph School

Within a decade, Ain Ebel established two schools. In 1890, Missionary Père Angelil requested the help of the nuns from Ain Ebel to teach the people of neighboring Mi'ilya for eight days. Following this, two nuns stayed behind to oversee the operation of the newly established school.

== Culture ==
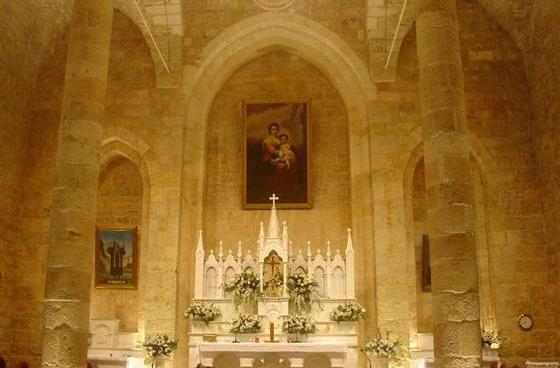
Our Lady of Ain Ebel

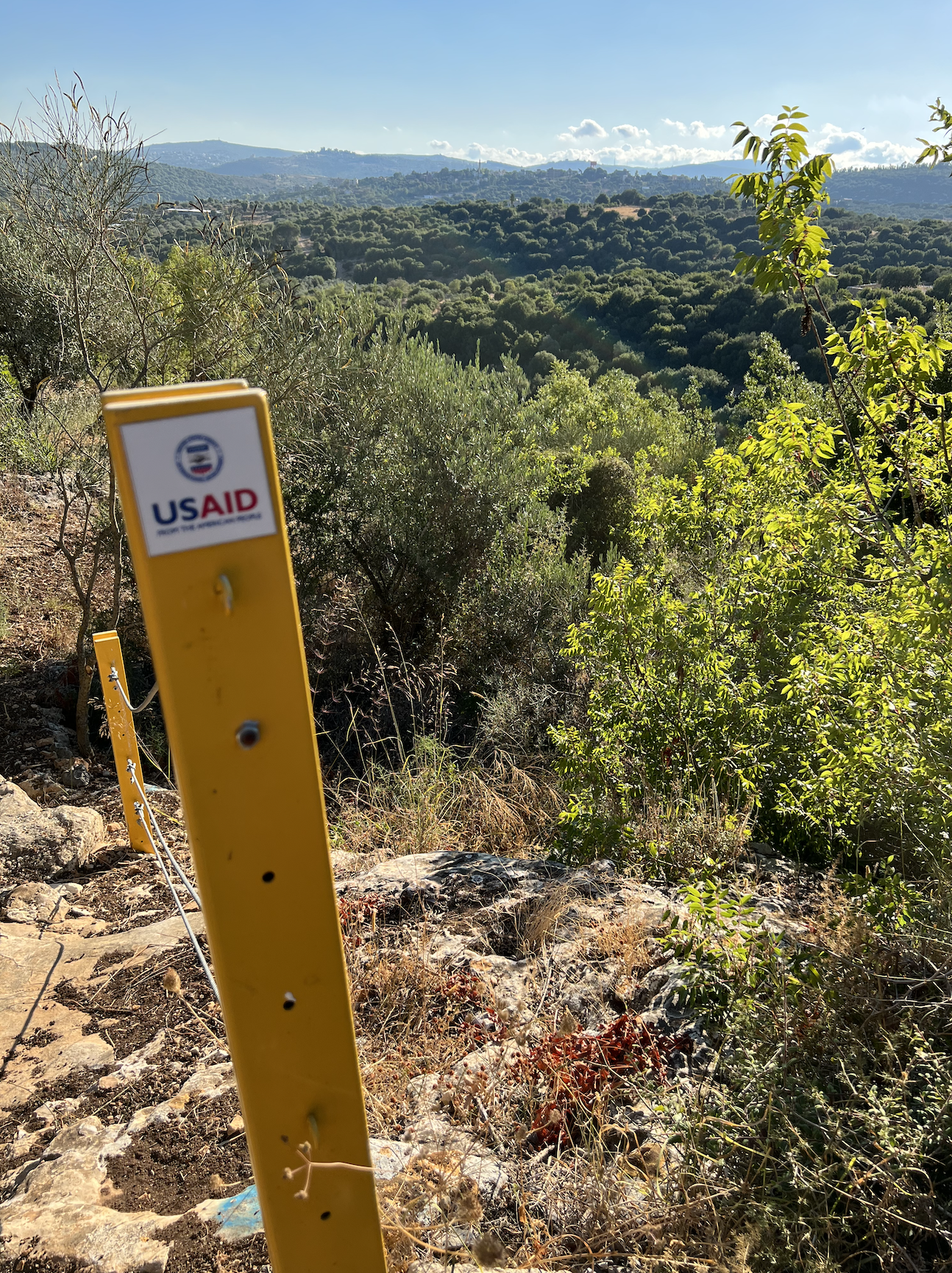
Lebanon Mountain Trail in Ain Ebel

=== Archeology ===
Approximately ten wine presses, dating to the Romano-Byzantine period, are located in Ain Ebel and its surroundings, primarily on the western side of the village adjacent to the hiking trail.

=== Architecture ===
There are three historic churches, built in the eighteenth and nineteenth century, and a convent that was built in 1857.

Chapels

- Chapel of the Sacred Heart
- Saint Mary's Chapel

The chapel was built in the 1930’s, replacing a structure from the 17th century.

Churches

- Our Lady of Ain Ebel Maronite Catholic Church

The building of the church was begun in 1864 but its construction was interrupted by the Ottomans, who viewed its construction as a potential military fort; work resumed in 1882 and was completed the same year, with later additions including the tile roof, marble paving, and a painting of the Virgin Mary nursing the infant Jesus, considered the only such representation in Lebanon, completed in 1906, and the marble altar installed in 1936.

- Saint Elie Greek Catholic Melkite Church

The church was built in 1866 for the Melkite Greek Catholic community.

- The New Saint Elie Greek Catholic Melkite Church

Convents

- Convent of the Sacred Heart

Shrines

- Saint Charbel Shrine
- Our Lady of Lourdes Monument
- Our Lady of Light Shrine,

A 200-foot tower outside the village, topped with a 45-foot statue of the Virgin Mary, offering visitors a viewing platform to gaze at the surrounding landscape

=== Festivals ===
Each summer, a grand festival is held in honor of the Blessed Virgin Mary, culminating on the national holiday of the Assumption of Mary on August 15. The celebration begins with a solemn procession of the Virgin Mary icon, which starts in the village square, winds through the streets as participants carry candles and sing hymns, and returns to the square. There, the village comes alive with outdoor events and open-air concerts that continue late into the night.

=== Sports ===
Street basketball tournaments are often held as part of annual summer festivals that take place during the week leading up to the national holiday of the Assumption of Mary on August 15.

==== Hiking ====
Funded by the United States Agency for International Development (USAID), in partnership with the Community Support Program (CSP), Ain Ebel's western slopes became connected in 2022 to the Lebanon Mountain Trail, a long-distance hiking trail that crosses Lebanon from north to south.

The trail, offered in three variants (two loop routes and one linear route), is an easy-level hike that passes through characteristic Galilean landscapes, offering panoramic views across stretches of olive groves, oak woodlands, and other Mediterranean vegetation, while also providing access to cultural landmarks such as churches, water sources, and archaeological remains.

== Notable figures from Ain Ebel ==
Arts

- George Diab, actor
- Raimundo Fagner, singer
- Louay Khraish, filmmaker
- Karol Sakr, singer
- Pascale Sakr, singer

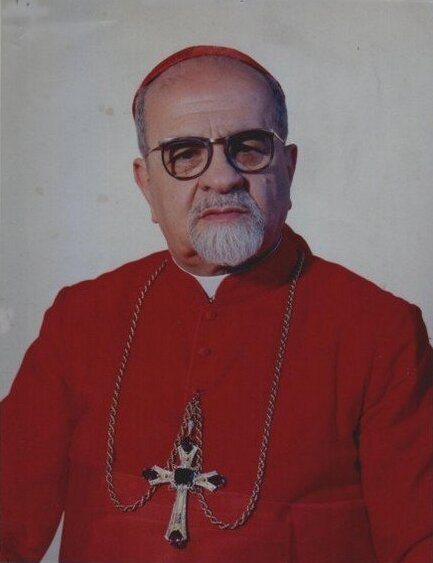
Cardinal Anthony Peter Khoraich

Clergy

- Anthony Peter Khoraich

The late Cardinal is the most prominent modern figure from Ain Ebel. He was the second Lebanese Patriarch to become cardinal of the Catholic Church.

- Bishop Maroun Sader
- Archimandrite Boulos Samaha
- Monsignor Elie Barakat
- Monsignor Albert Khreish

Military

- Benoît Barakat, First Lieutenant in the Lebanese Army
- Ibrahim Salloum, Colonel in the Lebanese Army
- Marc Diab, Trooper in the Canadian Army

Politics

- Etienne Saqr, Founder of the Guardians of the Cedars

== In literature ==
- In Half a Lira's Worth: The Life and Times of Vivronia by Mick Darcy

== See also ==
- List of extrajudicial killings and political violence in Lebanon

== Bibliography ==
- Conder, C.R.; Kitchener, H.H. (1881). The Survey of Western Palestine: Memoirs of the Topography, Orography, Hydrography, and Archaeology. Vol. 1. London: Committee of the Palestine Exploration Fund.
- Gharbieh, Hussein (2010). Lebanese Confessionalism and the Creation of the Shiʻi Identity. Lebanon: Dar El-Manhal El-Lubnani.
- Guérin, V. (1880). Description Géographique Historique et Archéologique de la Palestine (in French). Vol. 3: Galilee, pt. 2. Paris: L'Imprimerie Nationale.
- Long, Gavin (1953). Australia in the War of 1939–1945: Greece, Crete and Syria. Vol. 2. Canberra: Australian War Memorial.
- Palmer, E.H. (1881). The Survey of Western Palestine: Arabic and English Name Lists Collected During the Survey by Lieutenants Conder and Kitchener, R. E. Transliterated and Explained by E.H. Palmer. Committee of the Palestine Exploration Fund.
- Pirone, Bartolomeo; Noujaim, Halim (2023). I francescani di Terra Santa in Libano: Storia, gloria, speranze. Milan: Edizioni Terra Santa. ISBN 979-12-5471-202-3.
- Renan, E. (1864). Mission de Phénicie (in French). Paris: Imprimerie impériale.
