= Sin el Fil =

Sinn al-Fīl سن الفيل
- City
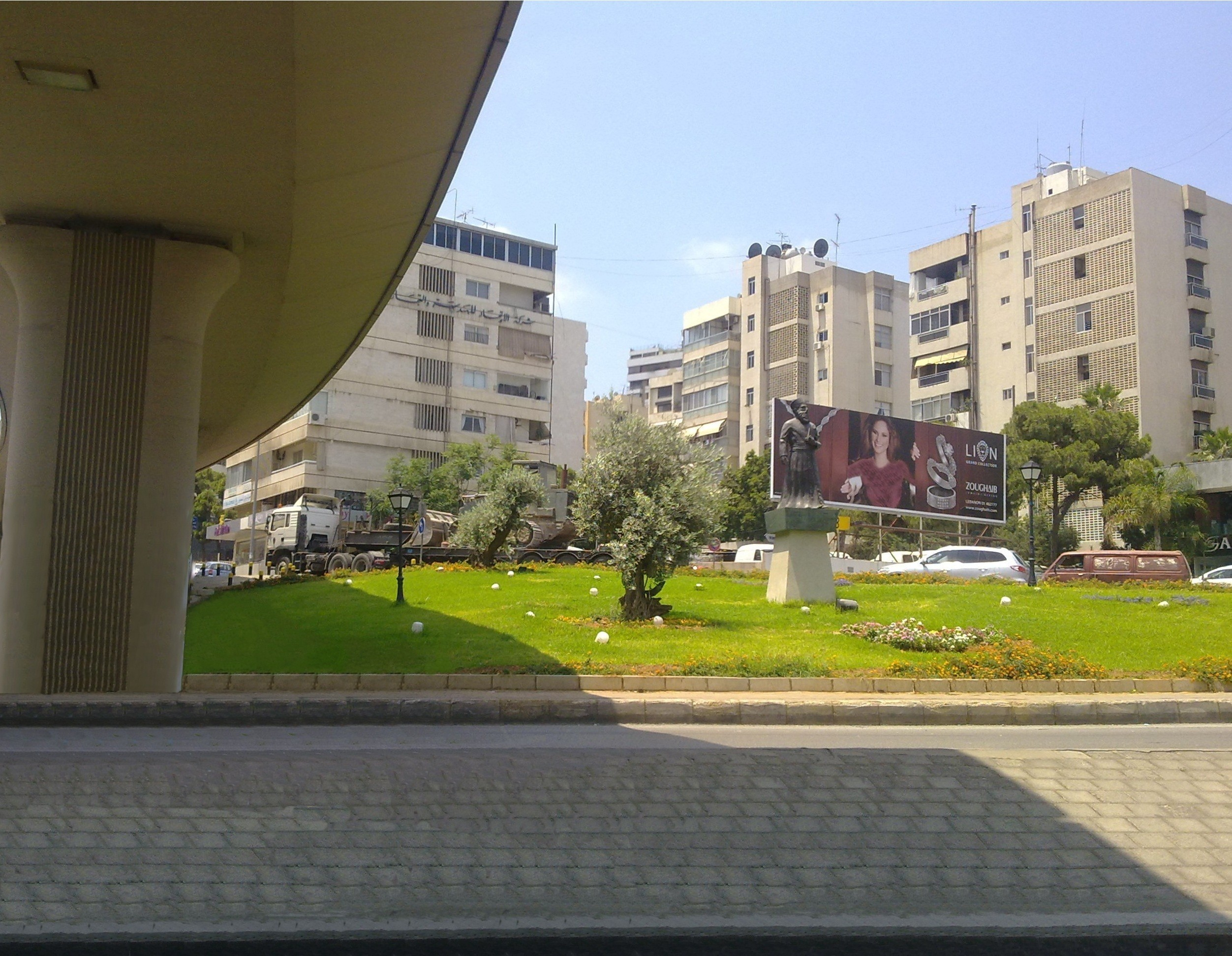

- Location within Lebanon
- Coordinates: 33°52′N 35°32′E
- Country: Lebanon
- Governorate: Mount Lebanon Governorate
- District: Matn District

Government
  - Time Zone: GMT +2 (UTC)
  - – Summer (DST): +3 (UTC)
  - Area Code(s): (+961) 1
- Time zone: UTC+2 (EET)
  - Summer (DST): UTC+3 (EEST)
- Dialing code: +961

The former "Metropolitan Hotel", currently a Hilton Hotel

Sin el Fil (Arabic: سنّ الفيل / ALA-LC: Sinn al-Fīl) is a suburb east of Beirut in the Matn District of the Mount Lebanon Governorate, Lebanon.

== Etymology ==
The name literally means 'ivory': "tooth" (sinn) of "the elephant" (al-fīl). Being geographically closer to the ancient city of Antioch and far remote from natural elephant habitat, it is believed that the town name may have been a derogation of Saint Theophilus of Antioch.

== Geography ==
With a rich red soil and moderate precipitation (but available ground water irrigation) the agricultural land of Sin el Fil in the early 20th century sprawled into a densely populated suburb. The natural landscape of the late century was dominated by stone pine. The Beirut River runs west of Sin el Fil and separates the town from the capital, Beirut.

== Demographics ==
In 2014, Christians made up 92.66% and Muslims made up 6.82% of registered voters in Sin el Fil. 45.35% of the voters were Maronite Catholics, 14.66% were Greek Orthodox and 14.22% were Greek Catholics.

== History and archaeology ==
=== Prehistory and Roman period ===
Collections of archaeological material from this limestone "hogsback" were made from the gullies to the south of the main road on the slopes of forested hills. The recovery areas were described as "ravines sinueuses" by Raoul Describes after making a collection in 1921. Other Jesuits who made collections from the area included Godefroy Zumoffen in 1908, Paul Bovier-Lapierre and Auguste Bergy as well as Mouterde, Gigues, Lorraine Copeland and Peter Wescombe. E. Passemard suggested that two of the trihedral pieces (i.e., composed of three planes) collected by Paul Bovier-Lapierre were Chalossian. Describes published some of the material as Acheulean but the bulk of the material was very mixed including many indeterminate Neolithic pieces including Trihedral Neolithic and Heavy Neolithic forms.

There was also a Roman occupation on the flat fields above the slopes.

Some archaeological material from Sin el Fil is in the National Museum of Beirut and the Museum of Lebanese Prehistory.

=== Civil War ===
On 1 March 1990, Sin el Fil was the scene of heavy fighting between Samir Geagea's Lebanese Forces (LF) and parts of the Lebanese Army loyal to General Michel Aoun. It was the last offensive in Aoun's failed attempt to take control of Christian East Beirut and caused extensive damage and many casualties.

== Twin towns – sister cities ==
- Prato, Italy, since 2008
