= Wadi Yaroun =

Wadi in Lebanon

- Wadi Yaroun
- Location within Lebanon
- 33.08778°N 35.39667°E
- Periods: Heavy Neolithic, Neolithic
- Cultures: Qaraoun culture
- Location: south of Ain Ebel, Lebanon
- Region: Nabatieh Governorate

Site notes
- Archaeologists: Paul Bovier-Lapierre, Henri Fleisch
- Public access: Yes

Heavy Neolithic pick of the Qaraoun culture - Double ended pick, triangular section with narrowing, jagged edges at both ends. Found at Mtaileb I.

Wadi Yaroun, Wadi Yarun, Wadi Jarun, Wadi Hanine, Jarun or Jareon is a wadi located south of Ain Ebel in the Bint Jbeil District of Nabatieh Governorate in Lebanon. After it reaches Yaroun it is called the Wadi Nahle or Wadi Nalesh and after reaching Debel it is called the Wadi Ayun et Tannour.

A Heavy Neolithic archaeological site of the Qaraoun culture was discovered by Paul Bovier-Lapierre west north west of Yaroun and south of Ain Ebel; Lorraine Copeland remarked that "the surface of this valley is literally covered in (worked flint) flakes". Bovier-Lapierre recovered several unpolished and polished axes with one exceptional elongated piece. All sorts of blades, scrapers, discs and other tools were found on the site and were stored with the Saint Joseph University (now the Museum of Lebanese Prehistory). Henri Fleisch determined the collection also included some later Neolithic pieces.
