= Al-Qaouzah =

Al-Qaouzah القوزح
- Municipality
- Location within Lebanon
- Coordinates: 33°07′17″N 35°20′22″E
- Grid position: 181/280 PAL
- Country: Lebanon
- Governorate: Nabatieh Governorate
- District: Bint Jbeil District
- Highest elevation: 800 m (2,600 ft)
- Lowest elevation: 700 m (2,300 ft)
- Time zone: UTC+2 (EET)
  - Summer (DST): UTC+3 (EEST)
- Dialing code: +961

Al-Qaouzah (also spelled Al-Qawzah, Arabic: القوزح, romanized: al-Qawzaḥ) is a municipality located in the Caza of Bint Jbeil in the Nabatiye Governorate in Lebanon.

== Geography ==
Al-Qaouzah occupies a hill with elevation ranging from 700 to 800 meters above sea level. It is located 110 km south of Beirut.

=== Vegetation ===
The main agricultural products of Al-Qaouzah are olive, carob and tobacco. Al-Qaouzah is celebrated for the quality of its thyme and za'atar production.

The Saint Joseph forest stretches from the village to the border.

== History ==
=== Late 19th Century ===
In 1881, the PEF's Survey of Western Palestine (SWP) described it: "A small village, containing about 100 Christians, with a small Christian chapel situated on a hill-top, with figs, olives, and arable land; a few cisterns for the water supply.”

=== 20th Century ===
The Saint Joseph church was built in 1927.

=== 21st Century ===
In July 2006, Al-Qaouzah, like other villages that string Lebanon's southern border, such as Ain Ebel, Debel, Rmaish, and Yaroun, was caught in the 2006 Lebanon War of Hezbollah and the Israeli army.

In 2019, a monkey owned by Sister Beatrice Mauger, who runs a peace project in the village, breached the border with Israel, and after a week on the loose and media frenzy, was returned to its owner by United Nations peacekeepers.

Al-Qaouzah, like other villages along the border, was caught in the crossfire during the 2023 Israel–Lebanon border conflict.

== Demographics ==
In 2014 Christians made up 97.59% of registered voters in Al-Qaouzah. 92.03% of the voters were Maronite Catholics.

== Bibliography ==
- Conder, C.R.; Kitchener, H.H. (1881). The Survey of Western Palestine: Memoirs of the Topography, Orography, Hydrography, and Archaeology. Vol. 1. London: Committee of the Palestine Exploration Fund.
- Palmer, E.H. (1881). The Survey of Western Palestine: Arabic and English Name Lists Collected During the Survey by Lieutenants Conder and Kitchener, R. E. Transliterated and Explained by E.H. Palmer. Committee of the Palestine Exploration Fund.
