= Chalossian =

Industry of flint tools from the Stone Age

Chalossian is an industry of flint tools from the Stone Age. Paul Bovier-Lapierre discovered it in Egypt.
