= Albert Khreish =

Albert Khreish البيرس خريش
- Monsignor
- Church: Maronite Church
- See: Patriarch of Antioch

Orders
- Consecration: by Anthony Peter Khoraish

Personal details
- Born: Ain Ebel, Lebanon
- Died: April 24, 1988 Jounieh

Monsignor Albert Khreish, A monsignor in the Maronite Catholic Church, was the head of the Maronite Spiritual Affairs Court and nephew of Cardinal Anthony Peter Khoraish. An authority on international law, he served on the Maronite religious tribunal. He was also lecturer at the Government-run Lebanese University.

== Assassination ==
On April 24, 1988, the Monsignor was abducted from his home near Jounieh. A week later on May 1, 1988, Khreish was found dead in the pine forest outside of Ghazir. Some reported that Khreish was shot 30 times, but the forensic doctor said Khreish was killed by 15 bullets, 13 of which were six millimeter and two 9 millimeter. His death was believed to be politically motivated, but the case was unsolved.
