= Lebanon Mountain Trail =

Hiking trail in Lebanon

- Length: 470 km (290 mi)
- Use: Hiking
- Difficulty: Moderate to difficult
- Season: All year round
- Website: https://www.lebanontrail.org

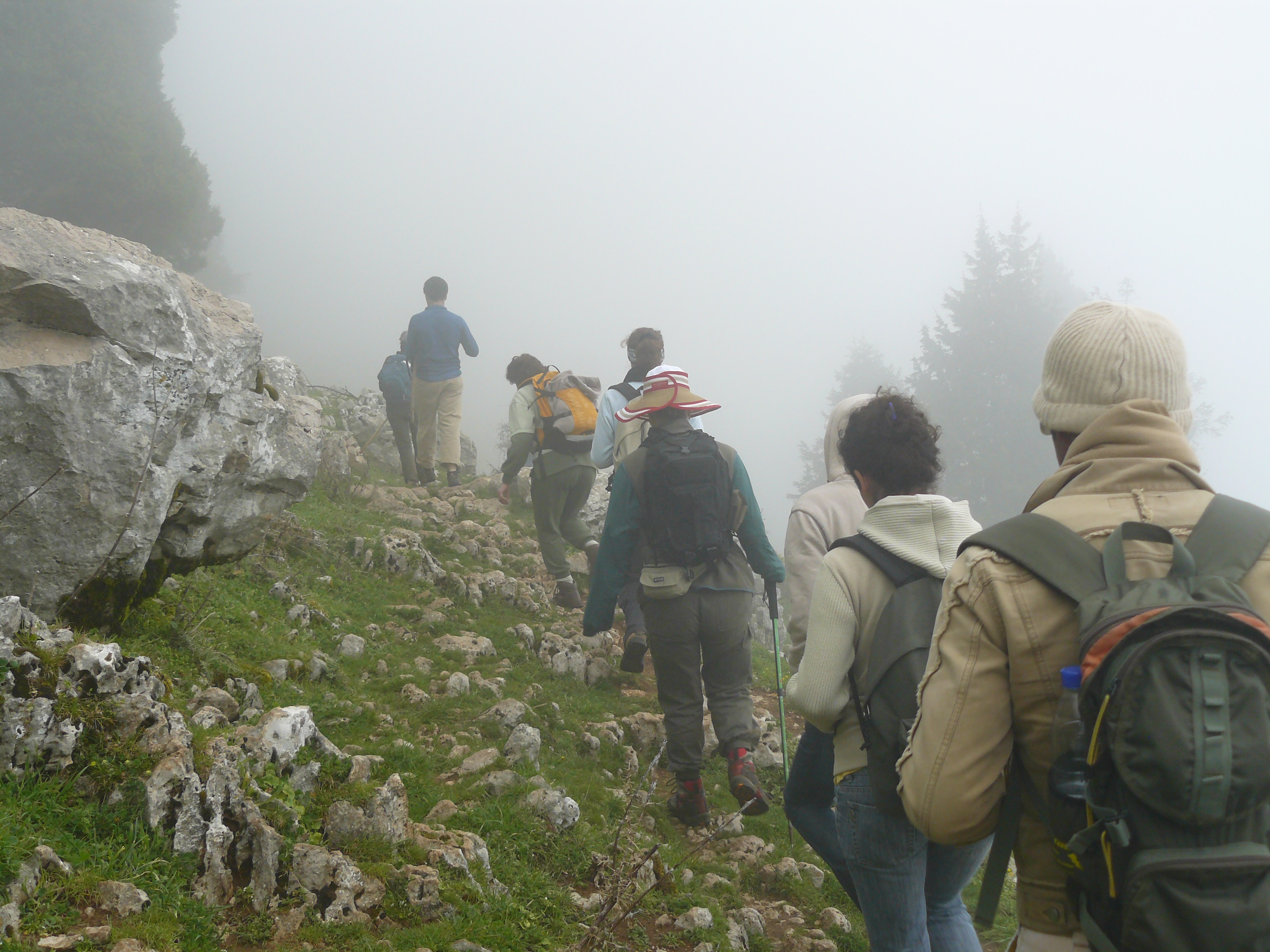
Dinniyeh

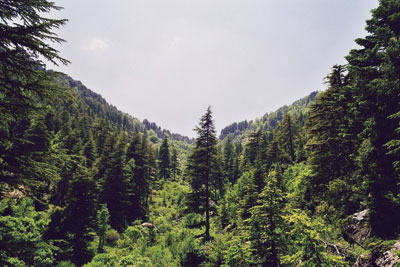
Ehden

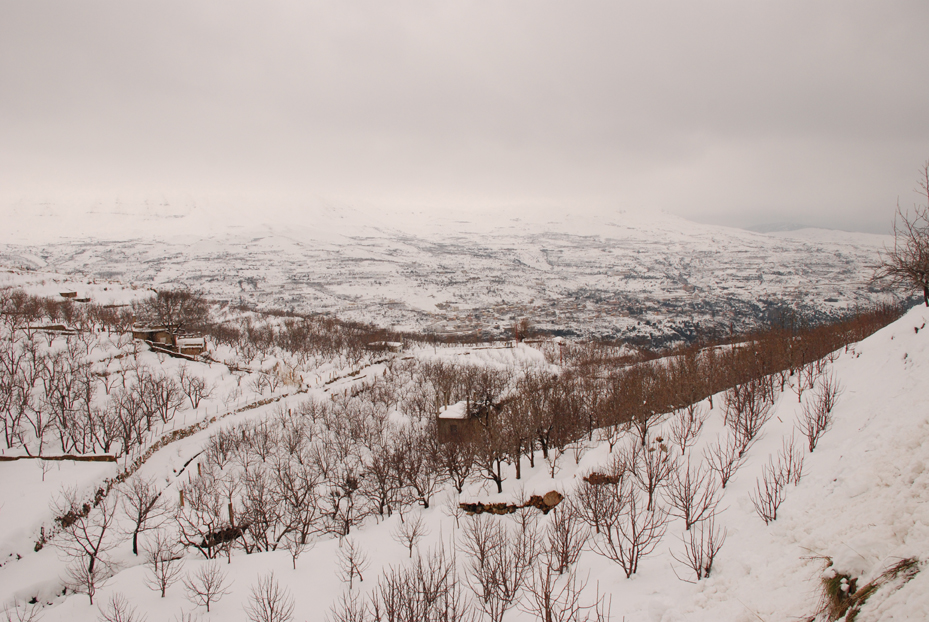
Bsharri in Winter

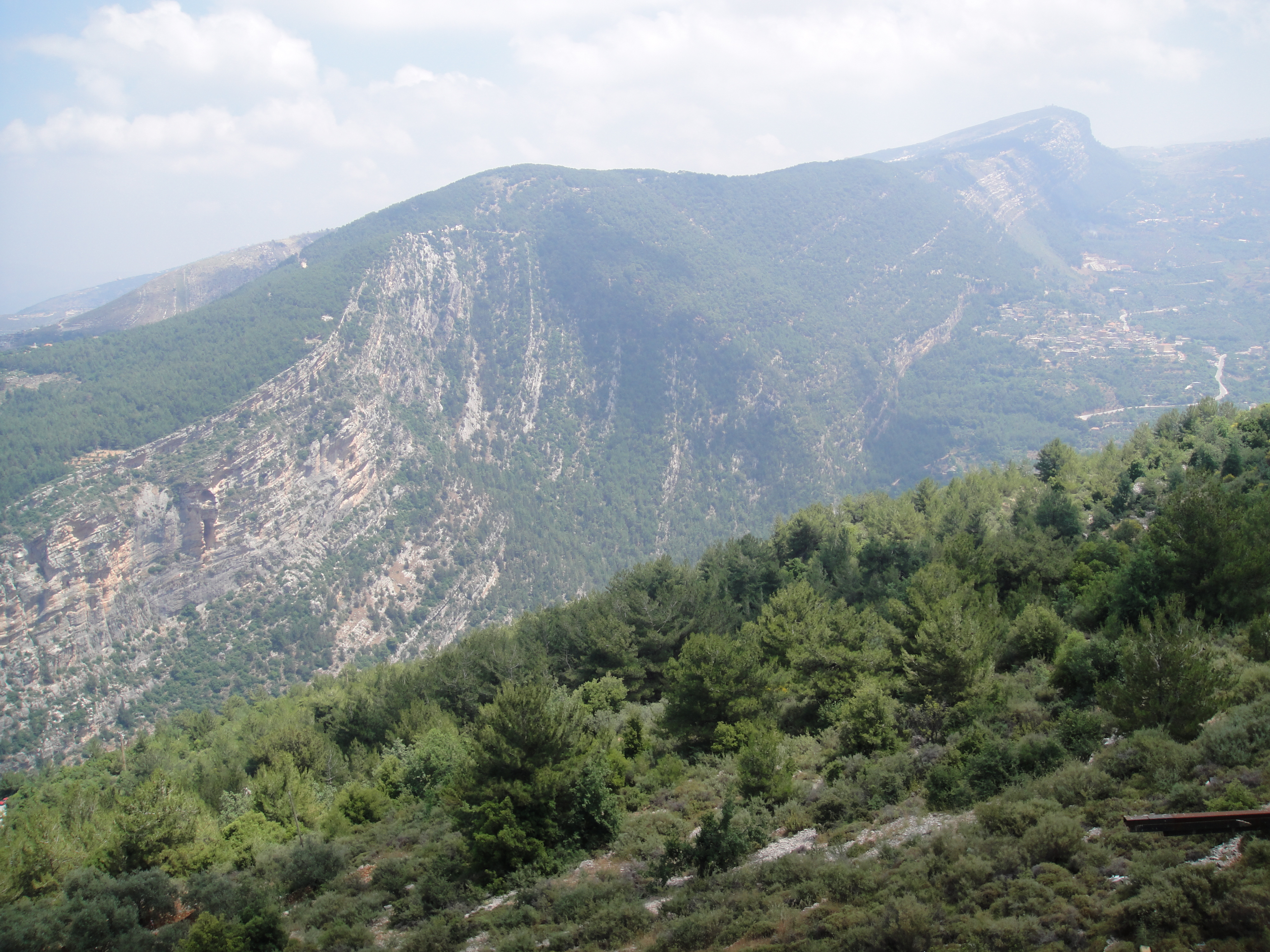
Bsharri in Summer

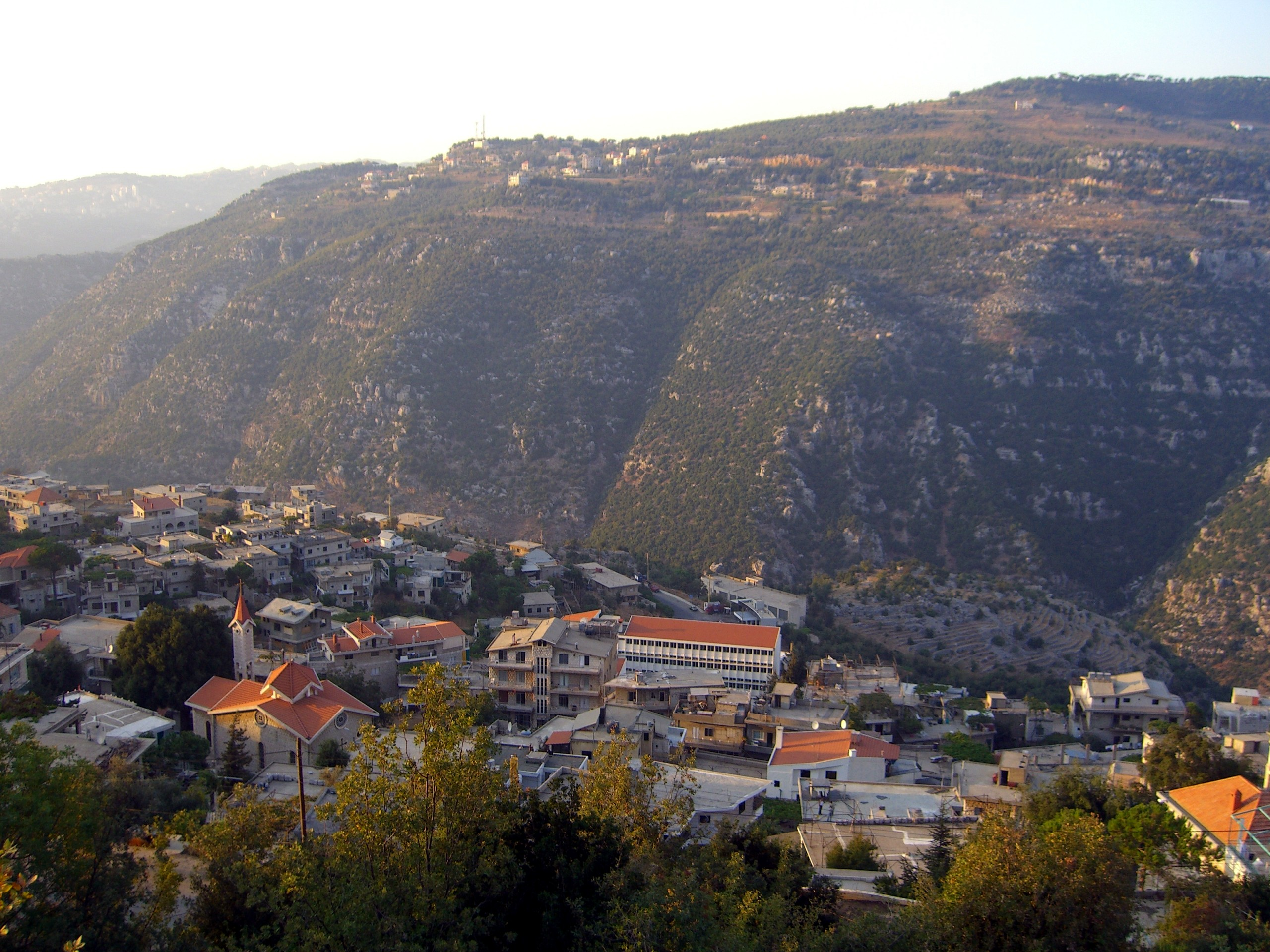
Baskinta

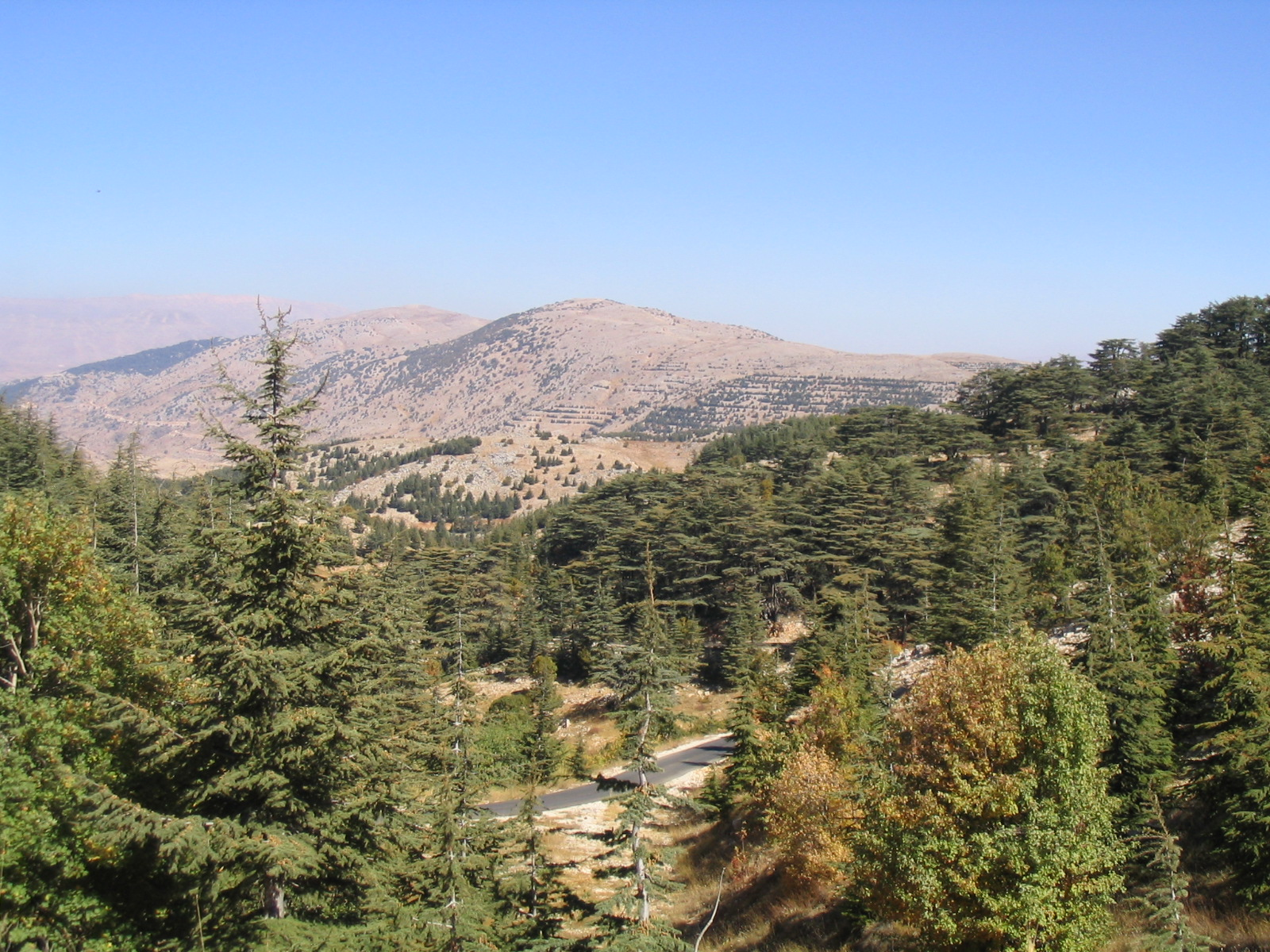
Barouk

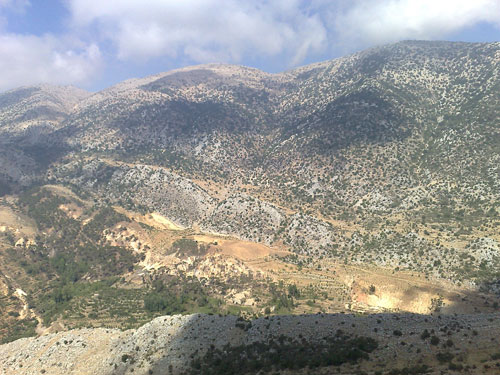
Niha

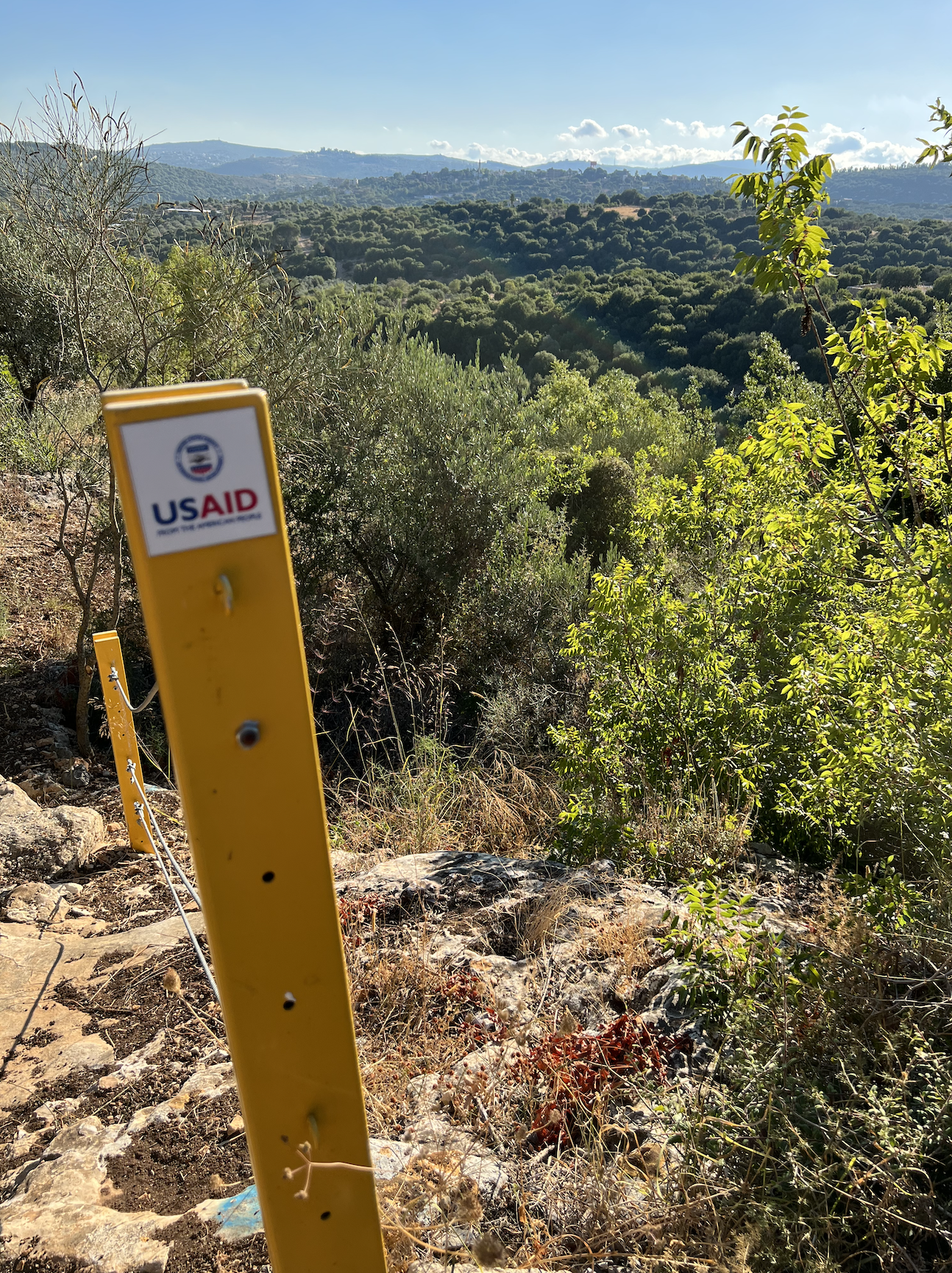
Ain Ebel

The Lebanon Mountain Trail (LMT; Arabic: درب جبل لبنان) is a long-distance hiking trail in Lebanon. It extends from Andaket in north of Lebanon to Marjayoun in the south along a 600 km (370 mi) path that transects more than 76 towns and villages at altitudes ranging from 570 to 2,073 meters (1,870 to 6,801 ft) above sea level.

The LMT passes through UNESCO heritage sites, nature reserves, and protected areas, and consists of footpaths, dirt and paved roads, river crossings, and a wide range of terrain types. Though there are campgrounds along the trail, Lebanon does not have much of a camping culture, so backpacking on the LMT usually means hiking sections of the trail between villages and staying in a B&B or guesthouse overnight.

Projects like the LMT are important for Lebanon during the country's financial and political turmoil. In 2019, hikers spent over $100,000 in villages along the trail, creating a major incentive for locals to preserve and protect their heritage.

== History ==
The Lebanon Mountain Trail was proposed in 2002 by Joseph Karam, president of the US-based consulting company ECODIT, while thinking of ways to develop ecotourism products in Lebanon. Taking inspiration from the Appalachian Trail in the US, he conceptualized the idea with his colleague Karim El-Jisr, and in 2005 applied for grant funding from USAID Lebanon. ECODIT was awarded $3.3 million to implement the project between 2006 and 2008, and to establish the Lebanon Mountain Trail Association (LMTA) to "ensure the long-term sustainability of the trail".

In 2021, the German Government in partnership with the International Labour Organization invested $1.1 million in the LMTA to fund maintenance of 590 kilometers of the main trail and side trails.

The LMT has been affected by Lebanon's economic crisis and the state of the country, including the Lebanese liquidity crisis, the 2020 Beirut Explosion, and the COVID-19 pandemic, which caused a large decrease in tourism.

== Thru-hiking ==
Every spring, the LMTA hosts a group thru-hike that covers the full trail in one month.

=== Fastest known times ===
On May 1, 2021, Ali Kedami and Nayla Cortas completed the LMT together in 6 days 12 hours and 15 minutes. Nayla also became the first woman to run the LMT. The previous record of 6 days and 17 hours was set in June 2017 by Patrick Vaughan.

== Notable locations ==
- Kadisha Valley
- Cedars of God
- Mount Lebanon

== Sections ==
The LMT is divided into 27 sections, each of which is 9–24 km long and can be hiked in one day:

Section 0: Andaket–Qobaiyat

1. Qobaiyat-Tachea
2. Tachea–Qemmamine
3. Qemmamine–Kfar Bnine
4. Kfar Bnine–Sir Dinniyeh
5. Sir Ed Dinnieh–Ehden
6. Ehden–Qannoubine
7. Qannoubine–Bsharri
8. Bsharri–Hasroun
9. Hasroun–Tannourine
10. Tannourine El Faouqa–Aaqoura
11. Aaqoura–Afqa
12. Afqa–Hrajel
13. Hrajel–Kfar Aaqab
14. Kfar Aaqab–Baskinta
15. Baskinta–Mtain
16. Mtain–Falougha
17. Falougha–Aain Zhalta
18. Aain Zhalta–Barouk
19. Barouk–Maasser
20. Maasser–Niha
21. Niha–Jezzine
22. Jezzine-Aaytanit
23. Aaytanit-Kawkaba Bou Aarab
24. Kawkaba Bou Aarab–Rashaya
25. Rachaya–Hasbaya
26. Hasbaya–Marjayoun
27. Ain Ebel

== Side trails ==
- Douma side trail
- Ehmej side trail
- Baskinta side trail
- Bkassine side trail
