= Chalaaboun =

Human settlement in Lebanon

Coordinates: 33.1242°N 35.4172°E

Chalaaboun (Arabic: شلعبون, romanized: Shalaʿbūm) is an archeological site in the outskirts of Ain Ebel in South Lebanon.

== History ==
Ernest Renan visited Chalaaboun during his mission to Lebanon and described what he found in his book Mission de Phénicie (1865-1874). Renan believed that Chalaaboun was the Biblical town of Shaalabbin of the Tribe of Dan. He found a tomb similar to that of Jesus Christ.

In 1875, the French archaeologist Victor Guérin called for the "attention to the sarcophagi alluded to by Lieutenant Kitchener. He says there are two which have sculptured on the sides a winged figure holding up a garland to right and left, the curve of which is surmounted on one side by a disc, and on the other by a cross. Beside one lies the cross, furnished with a ridge and acroteria. To the west of this hill rises a second, the slopes of which are terraced, the highest platform being sustained by a strong wall. Here are the vestiges of a small town, in the shape of cisterns and foundations of cut stones.

In 1881, the PEF's Survey of Western Palestine (SWP) described it: "Heaps of well-cut stones, some of large size; four or five sarcophagi, very large and well-preserved, decorated with figures holding up a wreath, similar to those at Kades, but better preserved. There are also two caves and many cisterns, and a large birkeh on the south side. This was an ancient and important place.

== Bibliography ==
- Conder, C.R.; Kitchener, H.H. (1881). The Survey of Western Palestine: Memoirs of the Topography, Orography, Hydrography, and Archaeology. Vol. 1. London: Committee of the Palestine Exploration Fund.
- Guérin, V. (1880). Description Géographique Historique et Archéologique de la Palestine (in French). Vol. 3: Galilee, pt. 2. Paris: L'Imprimerie Nationale.
- Palmer, E.H. (1881). The Survey of Western Palestine: Arabic and English Name Lists Collected During the Survey by Lieutenants Conder and Kitchener, R. E. Transliterated and Explained by E.H. Palmer. Committee of the Palestine Exploration Fund.
- Renan, E. (1864). Mission de Phénicie (in French). Paris: Imprimerie impériale.
