= Desecration of Christian statues in Debel =

2026 incidents involving Christian statues in Debel, Lebanon

- Part of the 2026 Lebanon war, 2026 Iran war, Hezbollah–Israel conflict (2023–present)
- An Israeli soldier strikes a crucifix in Debel, Lebanon, April 2026, in an image that circulated widely online
- Date: April and May 2026
- Location: Debel, Lebanon
- Perpetrator: Israel Defense Forces

In April and May 2026, Israeli soldiers were photographed desecrating Christian statues in Debel, a primarily Maronite Christian village in southern Lebanon. In April 2026, a soldier was photographed striking a fallen crucifix of Jesus with a blunt tool in a private garden; the image circulated online and the Israel Defense Forces said it was investigating. The soldier who damaged the crucifix and the one who photographed him were both removed from combat and jailed for 30 days. In May 2026, a photograph circulated showing a soldier placing a cigarette in the mouth of a statue of the Virgin Mary in the same village; the IDF again said it had identified the soldier and would investigate. The soldier responsible for placing the cigarette was later jailed for 21 days, and the one who photographed him for 14 days. Both incidents drew condemnation from Israeli officials, religious leaders, and foreign governments.

== Background ==
Debel is a Maronite Christian village in southern Lebanon, near the border with Israel, described by local clergy and residents as a predominantly Christian community. It was one of the few villages in southern Lebanon where residents remained during the Israeli military campaign against Hezbollah, which began on 2 March 2026 after Hezbollah fired rockets at Israel. Israeli forces took control of the area during the 2026 Lebanon war and remained there after a ceasefire between Israel and Lebanon was announced in April 2026; Reuters reported that Debel was among dozens of villages in southern Lebanon that remained under Israeli military control following the truce.

Houssam Naddaf, whose family owned the crucifix damaged in the first incident, told the Associated Press (AP) that he could not visit the property because of movement restrictions imposed by Israeli forces in the area.

== Crucifix incident ==
In April 2026, a photograph circulated online showing an Israeli soldier striking a fallen statue of Jesus on the crucifix in Debel. Reuters verified the location as Debel and reported that the soldier appeared to be using the blunt end of an axe to strike the crucifix; The Guardian described the object as a sledgehammer and reported that a second soldier filmed the incident. The image was first shared by Palestinian journalist Younis Tirawi.

Speaking to Reuters, Debel priest Fadi Falfel explained that the crucifix was located in a small shrine in the garden of a family who lives on the village's outskirts. The AP later identified the family as the Naddaf family and reported that the original crucifix had been installed in the garden in 2018.

The Israel Defense Forces confirmed the authenticity of the image and said the incident was being investigated. The IDF said it viewed the incident gravely and that the soldier's conduct was inconsistent with the values expected of its troops.

=== Disciplinary action ===
On 21 April 2026, two Israeli soldiers were removed from combat duty and placed in military detention for 30 days. One had damaged the religious symbol; the other had photographed or filmed the incident. Six other soldiers who were present and did not stop or report the incident were summoned for further review. The IDF said the conduct of those involved "completely deviated from IDF orders and values" and that instructions on conduct around religious institutions and symbols had been reinforced before troops entered the area and would be reinforced again following the incident.

=== Replacement of the crucifix ===
After the image circulated, the Israeli military said it was working to assist the local Christian community in restoring the statue, and Israeli soldiers later brought a smaller replacement crucifix, apologised, and installed it in the presence of village priests. Separately, Houssam Naddaf said his family had been contacted by United Nations peacekeepers about a crucifix offered by Italy. Because the replacement donated by Italy was closer in size to the original, the family accepted it and gifted the Israeli-supplied crucifix to a nearby church.

Later on 22 April, the Italian-donated crucifix was installed during a modest ceremony attended by UN peacekeepers, local clergy, and village residents.

=== Reactions ===
- Holy See: Days prior to the incident, Pope Leo XIV sent an Easter message of solidarity to Debel, writing that "...Jesus has gloriously triumphed over death. It is a joy that comes from heaven and that nothing can take from you." Following the desecration, the Pope met with the Apostolic Nuncio to Lebanon Paolo Borgia, directing him to enter the conflict zone alongside UNIFIL peacekeepers to bless and install a replacement crucifix. Pope Leo later held a surprise video call with 13 parish priests from Southern Lebanon to offer support. Concurrently, the Assembly of Catholic Ordinaries of the Holy Land condemned the act as a "grave affront to the Christian faith," and the Latin Patriarch of Jerusalem, Cardinal Pierbattista Pizzaballa, expressed profound indignation, stating the incident revealed a disturbing failure in moral formation.
- Israel: Prime Minister Benjamin Netanyahu condemned the damage to the crucifix and said he was "stunned and saddened" by the incident. Foreign Minister Gideon Sa'ar described the soldier's actions as disgraceful and apologised to Christians whose feelings had been hurt. Some Arab-Israeli Knesset members (Note: Includes Ayman Odeh and Ahmad Tibi) expressed fury, stating that the incident exposed a growing moral collapse and lack of discipline regarding non-Jewish holy sites within certain military ranks.
- Italy: President Giorgia Meloni thanked commander Diodato Abagnara and the Italian UNIFIL contingent for the replacement crucifix, stating the action sent a "heartwarming... powerful message of hope, dialogue, and peace".
- United Nations: The Secretary General of the United Nations's spokesperson described the desecration as "shocking". "The desecration of religious symbols, the desecration of houses of worship, is unacceptable, regardless of the religion," he added.
- United States: In an X (formerly Twitter) post, the U.S. Ambassador to Israel, Mike Huckabee described the desecration as an "outrageous act". He stated that "swift, severe, & public consequences are needed"

== Virgin Mary statue incident ==
An Israeli soldier placing a cigarette in the mouth of a Virgin Mary statue in Debel, in an image that circulated online in May 2026

On 6 May 2026, a photograph circulated online showing an Israeli soldier placing a cigarette into the mouth of a statue of the Virgin Mary in Debel, the same village where a soldier had previously struck a statue of Jesus. The image had been taken several weeks earlier.

The Israel Defense Forces said it had identified the soldier and that he would be disciplined. The IDF said it viewed the incident gravely and that the soldier's conduct "completely deviates from the values expected of its troops", and that command measures would be taken against the soldier according to the findings of an investigation. The IDF said the soldier putting the cigarette into the statue's mouth would be jailed for 21 days and the one who photographed him would be jailed for 14 days.

The Israel Defense Forces reiterated that it respected freedom of religion, holy sites, and religious symbols of all faiths, and that it did not intend to harm civilian infrastructure, religious buildings, or religious symbols during its operations against Hezbollah.

=== Reactions ===
- European Union: The EU foreign affairs spokesperson said in a written statement, “We recall the importance of preserving and protecting symbols of worship and ensuring freedom of religion" in response to the desecration of a statue of the Virgin Mary.
- Poland: The Ministry of Foreign Affairs condemned the desecration, stating that it "notes with outrage another case of a soldier of the Israeli Defense Forces insulting religious feelings in Lebanon" and that the treatment of the statue "offends the sensitivity of Christians".

== Aftermath ==
The AP referenced the Debel crucifix incident while reporting on the demolition of parts of a Catholic convent in the southern Lebanese village of Yaroun, noting that images of the soldier striking the fallen statue had sparked condemnation in Lebanon and internationally. Vatican News referenced the Debel crucifix incident when reporting on an attack on a French nun in Jerusalem. The AP reported that immediate disciplinary action for such behavior is rare, citing London-based NGO Action on Armed Violence as 88% of alleged misconduct by Israeli troops in occupied Palestine – including allegations of sexual abuse – are left unresolved.

== See also ==
- Anti-Christian sentiment
- Christianity in Lebanon
- Hezbollah–Israel conflict
- Religious violence
- United Nations Interim Force in Lebanon
- Violence against Christians in Israel
