= Rmaish =

Rmaish رميش (Arabic)
- Municipality
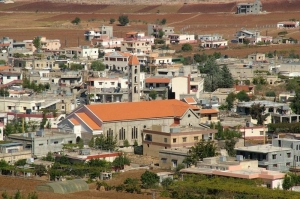
- Rmaish from the mountains

- Location within Lebanon
- Coordinates: 33°4′45″N 35°22′8″E
- Grid position: 184/275 PAL
- Country: Lebanon
- Governorate: Nabatieh Governorate
- District: Bint Jbeil District
- Elevation: 570 m (1,870 ft)

Population
  - Estimate (2024): 10,000 ▲
- Time zone: UTC+2 (EET)
  - Summer (DST): UTC+3 (EEST)
- Dialing code: +961
- Patron Saint: Saint George

Rmaish (Arabic: رميش, romanized: Rmaysh, Classical Syriac: ܪܡܝܫ) is the southernmost municipality of Lebanon, located in the district of Bint Jbeil, Lebanon, south of Ain Ebel, 1–2 km (0.6–1.2 miles) from the Lebanese-Israeli border, covering an area of 20 km^{2} (7.7 sq mi).

== Etymology ==
Due to the Syriac heritage of the village, the most likely meaning of its name comes from the Syriac root ramsha / ramshaya (ܪܡܫܐ), which refers to “night” or “sunset.” Ramsha is also the Syriac term for the evening liturgy (vespers), potentially suggesting an “evening town” or a place that is quiet at sunset. E. H. Palmer offered a more literal, but less likely, reading from classical Arabic, translating it as "scanty herbage" but this interpretation is implausible, given the evident fertility of the land, which stands in clear contradiction to such a description.

The name appears in several variant spellings, including Rmaich, Rmaych, Rmaysh, Rmeich, and Rmeish.

== History ==
Rmaish is a historic town with Roman and Crusader ruins.

In 1299, Rmaish was directly under Mamluk rule.

=== Ottoman period ===
Rmaish was under Ottoman rule until 1920. The town was involved in many wars and battles through the history. The most important ones are:

- In 1797, the viceroy of Acre Jazzar Pasha demolished and destroyed the village including the only church that was there. His reasons for that were that Rmaish supported Prince Bashir El Chahabi against him, they helped Napoleon in his battle against Acre and that he was afraid, that Rmaish being the only Christian village in the area, might encourage other Christian villages to rebel against him.

Ahmad Basha burned down the church including all the records that were kept inside. The people of Rmaish refused to go back to their village until Ahmad Basha died in 1804 when they went back and rebuilt their church and village.

- In 1824, the leader of Rmaish Youssef Daher El Choufani led the village to a victory over the viceroy of Acre, Abdallah El Darnadli.
- In 1829, Rmaish supported Prince Bashir El Chahabi in his battle against Sanour.
- Rmaish was hit by an earthquake in January 1837, which devastated the South all the way to Safad and Tiberias. William McClure Thomson traveled in the region three weeks afterwards, and described how Rumaish was mostly destroyed, with thirty deaths occurring as people were crushed in their homes. Many more would have suffered the same had they not been at evening prayers at the church there, which was a small building that was not seriously damaged.
- In 1838; the population of Rmaish was described as being Greek Orthodox Christians and
- In 1839, Rmaish fought side by side with the Shiite of the neighbouring villages against the Egyptian army which ended by the withdrawal of the Egyptian army after suffering heavy losses.
- In 1840, Daher El Choufani led Rmaish in another battle against the Egyptian army.

When the Ottoman Empire entered the war, they forced everyone between 18 and 60 years to fight in the Turkish army. People from Rmeish were forced to fight in Bulgaria, Istanbul and the Suez Canal in Egypt. Between 20 and 30 never came back from the war and no one knew anything about them till today.

In 1875 Victor Guérin found Rmaish to be inhabited by 500 Maronites, all impoverished. He observed that although the village appears to be relatively new—and according to its elders, it hasn't reached its hundred-year and five mark yet—it is located on the site of an earlier settlement.

In 1881, the PEF's Survey of Western Palestine (SWP) described Rumeish: "A stone and mud village, containing about 500 Christians; there is a Christian church; it is situated in the plain, with two large birkets and cisterns, surrounded by arable land and having some vineyards."

Rmaish suffered from many natural disasters, the most significant one was the earthquake of 1837 when an earthquake hit the village killing 35. The rest of the people were praying in the church that day and therefore were protected by the strong building of the church. Rmeich was hit by few other earthquakes in 1887, 1888 and 1927 which caused the destruction of many houses without any casualties.

At the start of the 20th century, Rmaish saw emigration on a large scale to South America, especially to Argentina and Brazil, due to the high taxes imposed by the Ottoman Empire. It is believed that around 100 left to Argentina between 1905 and 1914.

=== French Mandate ===
A petition was sent by all villages in south Lebanon to the Reconciliation Conference in Paris in 1919 asking for Rmaish and other villages to be included within Lebanon. The following is the petition:

"We call on the agreement and unanimity we, the residents of Tyre district of Shiites and Christians of forty thousands to be included in the State of Greater Lebanon for the following reasons: First, the Shiites of us are people form Sidon, Tyre, Marjayoun, El Rihan, Eklim El Kharoub and Hermel who truly want to join their nation. Second, Christians of us are of Lebanese origin and their ancestors came from the north to south. To the day they are relatives and want to join them."

==== Massacre of 1920 ====
After the Shia Conference of El-Hujair rejected Greater Lebanon and pledged allegiance to King Faisal, an act the Maronites of Jabal Amel perceived as a threat, a Shia gang led by Mahmoud Bazzi emerged, moving from brigandage to direct confrontation with French forces and the Christian their allies in the south, attacked Ain Ebel on 5 May 1920, pillaging and killing more than 50 people. It appears that the gangs responded to a call for jihad. After the attackers abandoned themselves in the violence, massacring children in the arms of their parents before killing them, raping young women and then killing them, and burning people who were still alive, they moved to the other Christian villages, Debel and Rmaish, killing and pillaging, so after 12 days of plundering and massacres, the French arrived and suppressed all activities in Jabal Amil region. While awaiting their return to the village, a soldier serving with English forces reportedly urged the villagers to sell their properties to Zionist buyers, citing the lack of any guarantee of return; however, the villagers unanimously refused. This incident illustrates the broader pressures faced by Christian communities in the Tyre district to relinquish their land and emigrate. The massacres hardened Maronite opinion in favor of Jabal Amil being part of Greater Lebanon, which borders were cemented at the San Remo conference in 1920.

=== Independence period ===
The Arab Liberation Army’s Second Yarmouk Battalion, numbering just over 300 troops, crossed from Rmaich on January 9–10, 1948, and advanced toward Tarshiha in the Galilee.

During the 1948 Arab–Israeli War, Rmaish received hundreds of Palestinian refugees, including from the village of Sha'ab. By late October and early November of the same year, refugees from other Palestinian villages, such as Al-Mansura and Kfar Bir'im sought refuge in Rmaish and Ain Ebel.

In mid-July 1976, Israel launched the Good Fence policy, opening boarder gates in Rmaish and Kfar Kila the following month. The Palestine Liberation Organization largely overlooked Israel’s shift to overt intervention in South Lebanon, remaining indifferent to its activities while focusing instead on political influence and rivalries over controlling food and aid distribution, ultimately imposing a total blockade on Rmaish, Debel, and Ain Ebel that forced residents to rely on the Good Fence policy for essential supplies.

In 1985, the residents of east Sidon were deported toward the south. 120 families were deported to Rmaish. Half of these families were to leave Rmaish within the next 2 months and the others stayed and lived in Rmeish until this day.

==== 2006 Hezbollah-Israel war ====
Rmaish, like other villages lining Lebanon's southern border, such as Ain Ebel, Debel, Qaouzah, and Yaroun, was caught in the crossfire during the 2006 Lebanon War between Lebanon and Israel. During the conflict, the village witnessed ferocious battles with missiles destroying many houses and orchards and leaving the townspeople besieged and without bread for three weeks.

===== Community opposition to Hezbollah activities =====
In 2022, structures built by Hezbollah near Rmaish, encroaching on properties owned by the Ameel, Alam, and Hajj families, were reported. This development angered local residents, municipal authorities, and religious leaders, leading to pressure from Maronite Patriarch Bechara Boutros Al-Rahi, who accused Hezbollah of encroachment. As a result, Hezbollah agreed to dismantle the structures, which were also a violation of UNSC Resolution 1701.

==== 2023 Hezbollah-Israel war ====
During the Gaza war, Hezbollah launched attacks on Israel from civilian areas in southern Lebanon, including Rmeich. After the start of the fighting, when hundreds of thousands of Lebanese fled their homes in other villages due to the clashes, residents of Rmaish largely remained steadfast despite being surrounded by ongoing fire. Hezbollah's efforts to establish military infrastructure in Rmaish led again to clashes with local residents, causing fear and displacement among the predominantly Christian population. Many women and children fled, leaving behind men who faced insecurity and potential looting. The Lebanese government was criticized for allowing Hezbollah to operate with impunity, thereby endangering local communities and exacerbating regional instability.

In March 2024, residents confronted Hezbollah members who attempted to install a rocket launcher in the town center. Later, during the Gaza war, Hezbollah's militant activities in Rmaish led to fear, displacement, and clashes with residents, and a confrontation over a rocket launcher installation in the town center.

Like most of the Christian population of South Lebanon, Rmeish residents are opposed to Hezbollah's presence in the area.

==== 2026 Hezbollah-Israel war ====
On March 2, 2026, Rmaish was once again caught in the midst of a regional war when Hezbollah, the Iranian-allied proxy in Lebanon, launched strikes on Israel in response to the killing of Iranian supreme leader Ali Khamenei.

The residents of the village, along with those of Ain Ebel and Debel, defied Israeli evacuation and displacement orders, as they had done in 2024.

Heavy Israeli strikes against Hezbollah positions around Rmaish, Ain Ebel, and Debel severely restricted movement in the area, with travel between the villages requiring coordination with the Lebanese Armed Forces or the United Nations Interim Force in Lebanon (UNIFIL), although both the UN and Lebanese officials were often unable to secure individual civilian movements without an international mechanism involving the United States, France, and Israel.

On 31 March 2026, the Lebanese Army withdrew amid advancing Israeli forces, one week before residents celebrated Easter under siege.

On April 22, a wounded Hezbollah militant fled to Rmeish and was treated by emergency responders in the village, while Israeli forces repeatedly demanded he be handed over, threatening to evacuate the village when officials in Rmeish refused to hand over the young man. After continuous threats and demands, and after the IDF spoke directly to him, the injured man agreed to surrender to spare the village and left on foot toward a designated location, ultimately surrendering to the Israeli army.

Despite the U.S.-brokered framework agreement of June 26, 2026, outlining Israeli withdrawal, border security, and Hezbollah's disarmament, Rmaish remained isolated due to continued military operations and movement restrictions, while only one of its two boreholes remained operational and damaged equipment threatened the continuity of the water supply, with access to emergency and hospital care remaining critically limited.

== Public services ==
=== Red Cross ===
The red cross centre opened in 1968 to provide medical assistance to the people of the area. The centre was built in Rmaish because of its position halfway between the other 2 hospitals in the region. All the members in this centre are volunteers.

=== Education ===
The first school was opened in 1870 by The Jesuits but was closed in 1900 to reopen in 1920 to close again 1949.

From 1949 till 1955, the Pontifical mission opened a school for the Palestinians refugees.

From 1945, Rmaish Supplementary School was opened which closed down in 1992.

Our Lady of Lebanon School was opened in 1959.

In 1974 Rmaish high school was opened.

=== Religion ===
The streets and intersections of Rmaish, along with its home gardens and stone fences, are lined with statues and reliefs of St. Mary, Saint Charbel, St. George the patron saint and other saints, reinforcing the village’s deeply rooted spiritual character.

Saint George church

Was originally built around 1700, to later destroyed in 1787 and then to be rebuilt in 1806. The church was Cohesive and strong therefore it survived the 1837 earthquake that destroyed the village. Between 1925 and 1929 it was knocked down and then rebuilt on a larger land.

Church of Transfiguration

In the 1970s, because of the rapid grow of the number of people living in Rmaish, and the impossible mission of expanding the saint George church, the people of Rmaish decided to build a new church. The work did not start until 1982 to finish only at the start of 2000.

Lady of the Annunciation Monastery

The building of the monastery was approved in 1983. By 1986 it was finished to be the first maronite monastery in south Lebanon. In August 2001, Father Choufani was appointed abbot of the Our Lady of the Annunciation Monastery. Following his appointment, he promptly initiated two major projects for the monastery.

==== Weeping Statue of Rmaish ====
On 18 November 1983, a statue of the Virgin Mary at the mayor’s home was reported to shed blood and oil. The phenomenon drew the attention of Archbishop Maximos Slalom, who visited the site. To accommodate the growing number of visitors from the town and surrounding villages, the weeping statue was later moved to the church. Despite widespread interest, the event was never officially recognized as a miracle.

== Geography ==
Rmaish is situated in the mountainous region of southern Lebanon, in an area historically known as Belad Bechara within Jabal Amel, also referred to as the Lebanese Upper Galilee. The town occupies a fertile mountain meadow surrounded by gently rolling highlands, at an average elevation of 566 m (1,857 ft) above sea level.

=== Geology ===
Rmaish has two sinkholes, Smokhaya and Katmeen, which are considered ecologically significant and in need of protection.

== Politics ==
Municipal Council

A number of rich and powerful personnel took the responsibility of managing the affairs of Rmaish and its people.

Municipal Elections

The Municipal election was held for the first time in 1961. It was based on an alliance of the majority of the main families against another alliance of the minority of the same families. Few hours before the elections, the two alliances meet and agreed on a head of the municipality council and a representation of all the families in the council. On that basis the first election was held in the village.

This council was behind a lot of projects, the most important are:

- The establishment of the electrical system in 1964
- The establishment of the water system in 1964
- Paving the roads in 1965
- Buying 1000 m2 to build a high school

Parliamentary Elections

These elections reflected the agreement or disagreement of families. Usually the village has been split between supporters and opposition to the deputy or another; however they agreed once to vote for the same deputy.

Local Administration 1975–1992

The local administration is a committee comprising representatives of all the families in the village. The Local Administration handled the municipal council and the mayor duties because of the events that happened at that time.

== Demographics ==
In 2014 Christians made up 98.57% of registered voters in Rmaish. 92.95% of the voters were Maronite Catholics. The Christian population is mostly Maronite.

The main families in Rmaish are:

Family name	Origin	Date of arrival to Rmeish
Alam	Baskinta	1696
Assaf	Aita	1855
Amil	Gernaya	1855
Aoun	Seghbin	1900
Awad	Zgharta	1918
Abou Izaa	–	1922
Abdouch	–	–
Ayoub	–	–
Badeen	–	1911
Choufani	El Chouff	1692
Elias	–	–
Endrawous	Kafar Bereem	1876
Gerges	–	1825
Ghanatios	El Chouff	1860
Ghanem	–	–
Habib (Also known as haddad)	Dirdghaya	19th century
Haddad	Tanbourit	1820
[Hajj/Hage](Also known as Saiid)	Qaitouli	1700–1750
Halim Hajj	Qana	1918
Jarjour	France	1900
Kalakech	–	1788
Khazen	Kesourwan	1697
Khiyami	Beit Chabeb	–
Makhoul	Akoura	1750
Mouawad	Zgharta	–
Mourkoss	Akoura	1750
Nasrallah	Sighbein	1850
Sabra	–	–
Tanios	Akar	1700
Touma	Haifa	–
Sahmout	–	–

== Economy ==
Agricultural cultivation in Rmaish includes the growing of tobacco and olives.

Planting tobacco started in Rmaish halfway through the 18th century due to several natural factors: vast agricultural land, availability of irrigation water and farmers.

In 1883, the Ottoman government granted the right to monopolize the tobacco to the Regie Company. Rmaish residents did not abide by this resolution, which prompted the government to send a detachment of the army to end this situation. It ended after 8 days by the people of Rmaish agreeing on the decision.

== Archeology ==
Around Rmaish there are few mountains that were occupied by different people through the history, which still have some remains today. The people who lived in these mountains are the Romans and Muslims. The most important mountains are:

Katamoun The Romans lived in Katamoun around 2,000 years ago and transformed it to a military post where they built a fortress to protect their country. Until today some remains of the fortress can still be seen in the form of a 50mx50m fence.

Koura was occupied by the Romans and the Muslims who stayed there until the end of 1838 when they left because of an earthquake that hit the area. The ruins in that mountain are still standing till today.

Some other ruins in the form of old cemeteries found in different parts of the village which are believed to go back to the 4th century BC.

== Notable figures from Rmaish ==
- Father Choukrallah Choufani
- Father Najib Amil
- François el Hajj

== Bibliography ==
- Conder, C.R.; Kitchener, H.H. (1881). The Survey of Western Palestine: Memoirs of the Topography, Orography, Hydrography, and Archaeology. Vol. 1. London: Committee of the Palestine Exploration Fund.
- Guérin, V. (1880). Description Géographique Historique et Archéologique de la Palestine (in French). Vol. 3: Galilee, pt. 2. Paris: L'Imprimerie Nationale.
- Palmer, E.H. (1881). The Survey of Western Palestine: Arabic and English Name Lists Collected During the Survey by Lieutenants Conder and Kitchener, R. E. Transliterated and Explained by E.H. Palmer. Committee of the Palestine Exploration Fund.
- Thomson, W.M. (1882). The Land and the Book: Or, Biblical Illustrations Drawn from the Manners and Customs, the Scenes and Scenery, of the Holy Land: Central Palestine and Phænicia. Vol. 2. New York: Harper & brothers.
