= George Diab =

Lebanese actor and voice actor

- جورج دياب
- Occupations: Actor, voice actor

George Diab (Arabic: جورج دياب) is a Lebanese actor and voice actor.

== Filmography ==
=== Film ===
- Very Sweet and a Liar. 2013

=== Television ===
- Nos Youm. 2016
- Cello. 2015
- Chawareh Al Zill. 2013
- Hotel Al Afrah. 2012
- Khataya Saghira. 2005
- Secretairit Baba. 2000
- Abdo w Abdo. 2008
- Marte w Ana. 2007
- helwi w kezzabi. 2012

=== Plays ===
- Waylon Le Omma - Lawyer. 2013

=== Dubbing roles ===
- Adventure Time - Ice King
- Cars - Doc Hudson (Classical Arabic version)
- Cars 2 - Francesco Bernoulli (Classical Arabic version)
- Dinosaur - Yar (Classical Arabic version)
- Finding Nemo - Mr. Ray, Mr. Johansen, Bloat, Gerald (Classical Arabic version)
- Inside Out (2015 film) - Anger
- Monsters University - Brock Pearson
- Mr. Bean
- Over the Garden Wall (miniseries) - The Woodsman
- The Incredibles - Gilbert Huph (Classical Arabic version)
