= Debel, Lebanon =

Debel دبل (Arabic) ܕܒܠ (Syriac)
- Municipality
- Location within Lebanon
- Coordinates: 33°07′15″N 35°22′4″E
- Grid position: 184/280 PAL
- Country: Lebanon
- Governorate: Nabatieh
- District: Bint Jbeil

Government
  - Type: 15 Member Municipal Council
  - Body: Municipal Council
  - Mayor: Akl Naddaf (Ind.)
- Highest elevation: 720 m (2,360 ft)
- Lowest elevation: 580 m (1,900 ft)
- Time zone: UTC+2 (EET)
  - Summer (DST): UTC+3 (EEST)
- Dialing code: +961
- Patron Saint: St. Mary

Debel (Arabic: دبل, Classical Syriac: ܕܒܠ) is a municipality located in the caza of Bint Jbeil District in the Nabatiye Governorate in Lebanon. It is about 87 km from Beirut.

== Etymology ==
The name of the village, also transliterated Debl and Dibl, is thought to derive from the Syriac language deblé (ܕܒܠܐ), meaning "dried figs," which grow abundantly in the region. Located in Upper Galilee, the village has led some scholars to suggest it may correspond to the biblical place “Diblah” (or “Diblath”), mentioned in the Book of Ezekiel 6:14 as a northern boundary marker.

In older and outdated cartographic sources, the village name appears as Debel Ammaye (دبل أمية). While the precise date when the second element, 'Ammaye,' fell out of use is unclear, it has sometimes been suggested that it was dropped because of its phonetic resemblance to the Arabic term for “illiterate.” It is very likely that Ammaye derives from Syriac, as does Debel itself. It may be related to ܥܡܡܐ (ʿammē / ʿammā, “peoples,” “nations”) or ܥܡܡܝܐ (ʿammāyā, “Gentile,” “pagan,” or “foreign”), forms which are commonly understood to reflect Northwest Semitic linguistic patterns associated with the concept of “gentile” or “nation.”

== Demographics ==
In 2014 Christians made up 99.59% of registered voters in Debel. 92.36% of the voters were Maronite Catholics.

== Geography ==
Debel occupies several hills with elevations ranging from 580 to 720 meters above sea level. The main agricultural products of Debel are olives and tobacco.

== History ==
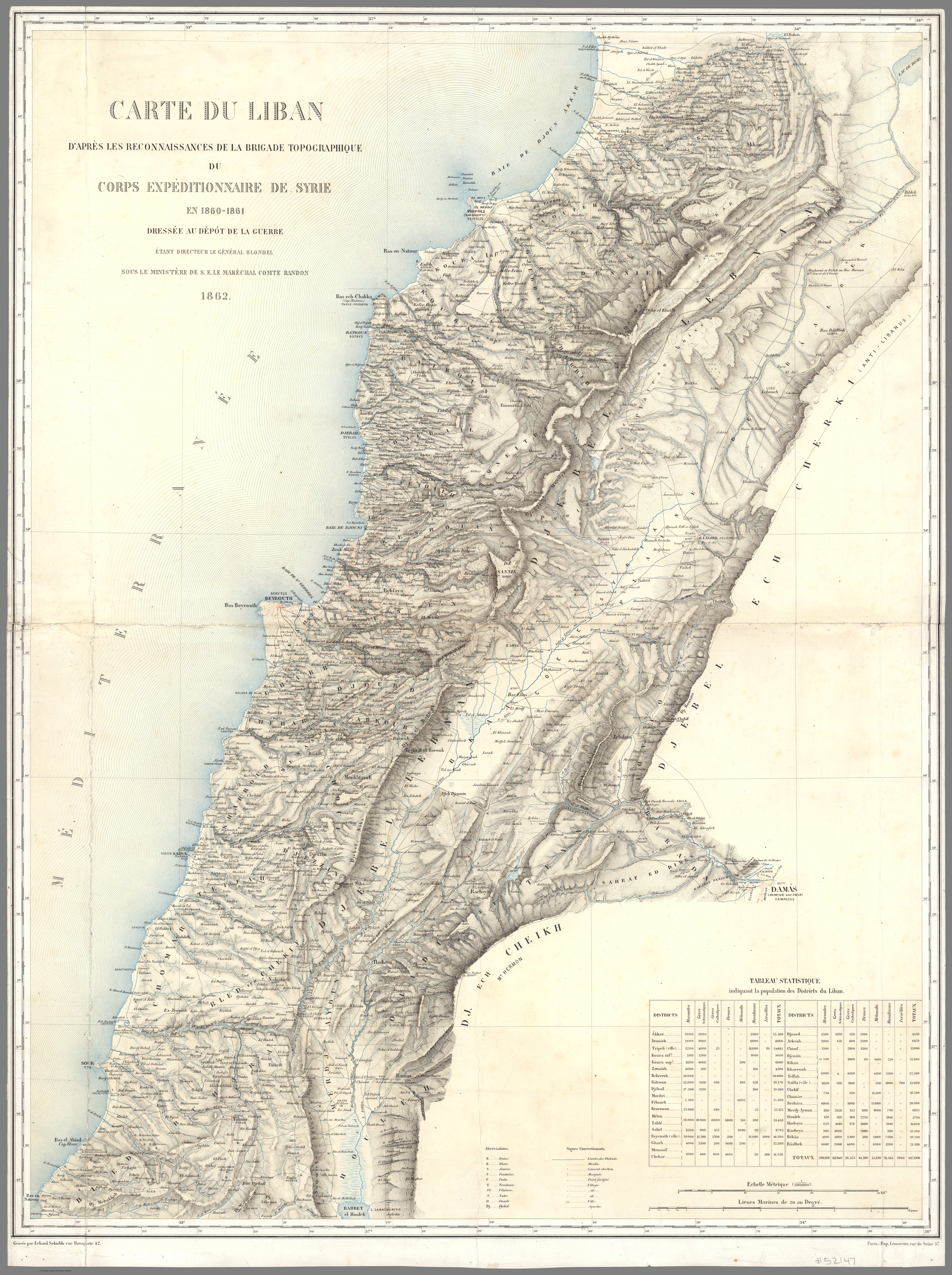
Debel appearing in an 1862 map drawn by the French expedition of Beaufort d'Hautpoul, later used as a template for the 1920 borders of Greater Lebanon.

Some historians believe that the village corresponds to the biblical place “Diblah” (or “Diblath”), mentioned in the Book of Ezekiel 6:14 as a northern boundary marker.

One of the earliest known historical references to the village dates to 1596, when it was recorded in tax registers of the Ottoman nahiya (subdistrict) of Tibnin under the liwa' (district) of Safad, with a population of 12 households and 6 bachelors, all Christians. The villagers paid a fixed tax rate of 25% on agricultural products, such as wheat, barley, summer crops, fruit trees, goats and beehives, in addition to "occasional revenues”; a total of 1,530 akçe.

In 1852, Edward Robinson noted the village ("Dibl") on his travels in the region.

Ernest Renan visited the area during his mission to Lebanon and described what he found in his book Mission de Phénicie. At Dibl he found Greek Inscriptions.

In 1875, Victor Guérin visited and described it as a village with 400 Maronite inhabitants. He also found here several inscriptions in Greek. He further noted: "At this village there are some rock-cut tombs, in one of which there is an inscription. Many well-dressed stones are used, and turn up in digging. On one of these was a fragmentary inscription. Under some of the houses of the village, there is a large piece of tesselated pavement of very good design. The colours are red, black, and white. There are some sarcophagi and some broken pillars. This was probably an early Christian site."

In 1881, the PEF's Survey of Western Palestine (SWP) described Dibl: "A village, built of stone, containing about 500 Christians (Guerin says 400 Maronites); there is a Maronite chapel. It is situated on a hillside, with grapes, figs, olives, mulberries, and arable land. The water supply is from many good springs in the wady to the north-west of the village, and cisterns and birket near the village."

According to Irish missionary and traveller, Josias Leslie Porter, near the village in the 1880s stood a rock-cut tomb known as Hazzur, along with several others in the surrounding area; an arch of Greek or Roman masonry once rose over Hazzur’s entrance, though its stones have since been quarried away.

=== 2024 Lebanon war ===
On 2 October 2024, an Israeli airstrike on the town killed three people, a couple and their son. On 15 October 2024, a house in the settlement was subjected to artillery fire and an airstrike, resulting in the wounding of one girl but causing no deaths.

=== 2026 Lebanon war ===
Debel was once again caught in the midst of a regional war when Hezbollah, the Iranian-allied proxy in Lebanon, launched strikes on Israel on March 2, 2026, in response to the killing of Iranian supreme leader Ali Khamenei.

The residents of Debel, along with those of Rmaish and Ain Ebel, openly defied widespread Israeli evacuation and displacement orders, leaving these towns among the last remaining populated areas in the province.

On March 28, 2026, Israeli army gunfire targeting a pickup truck on the main road between the Christian villages of Debel and Rmaish along the southern border killed two Debel residents, Georges Soueid and his son Elie, after requests to authorities for safe passage had reportedly gone unanswered. Georges and Elie Soueid's car was struck while attempting to bring back much-needed supplies from Rmeish via a road residents considered the last safe route out of Debel. Elie initially survived the Israeli attack on him and his father, but was bleeding heavily from a femoral artery wound and could not be reached by the Lebanese Red Cross because the road was unsafe. Father Fadi Felfeli later risked his life on the same road to retrieve the coffins of the two men.

On April 5, 2026, a Vatican-led convoy carrying more than 40 tons of aid to Debel was called off due to what Lebanon’s Maronite Church described as “security reasons.”

On Easter Day 2026, Pope Leo XIV, through Archbishop Paolo Borgia, conveyed a message of solidarity and consolation to residents of Debel amid ongoing conflict, emphasising his spiritual closeness to suffering communities. The planned in-person delivery of the message and humanitarian aid was canceled due to continued Israeli attacks in the area.

Fierce Israeli strikes against Hezbollah positions around Debel, Ain Ebel, and Rmaish severely restricted movement in the area, with travel between the villages requiring coordination with the Lebanese Armed Forces or the United Nations Interim Force in Lebanon (UNIFIL), although UN and Lebanese officials were often unable to “deconflict” individual civilian movements without an international mechanism involving the United States, France, and Israel.

Widespread outrage erupted following the circulation of a viral photograph and video showing an Israeli soldier smashing a statue of Jesus Christ with a sledgehammer in Debel. The incident drew condemnation from religious leaders, international figures, and the Israeli government. The incident occurred shortly after a ceasefire began on 19 April 2026. Videos and photos show a soldier in uniform striking a fallen statue of Jesus Christ at a small residential shrine. The incident was swiftly condemned by officials from the Israeli military and government including the Prime Minister who said the responsible soldier was a criminal. The responsible soldier as well as the soldier who photographed him were both removed from combat and sentenced to 30 days in military prison. Israel’s Northern Command in full coordination with the village’s community has repaired the damaged shrine. On 23 April 2026, Italian soldiers installed a new statue of Jesus in place of the previous statue.

In late April 2026, Israeli military excavators were also filmed destroying solar panels in Debel, in addition to damaging water infrastructure.

In May 2026, an Israeli soldier was photographed desecrating a statue of the Virgin Mary in Debel by placing a cigarette in the statue's mouth. The soldier who put the cigarette was later jailed for 21 days, and the one who photographed him for 14 days.

Despite the U.S.-brokered framework agreement of June 26, 2026, outlining Israeli withdrawal, border security, and Hezbollah's disarmament, Debel remained isolated due to continued military operations, repeated attacks, and movement restrictions, leaving residents without safe access to the main municipal water source, reliant on costly water trucking because of damaged water infrastructure, and facing critically limited access to emergency and hospital care.

== Bibliography ==
- Conder, C.R.; Kitchener, H.H. (1881). The Survey of Western Palestine: Memoirs of the Topography, Orography, Hydrography, and Archaeology. Vol. 1. London: Committee of the Palestine Exploration Fund.
- Guérin, V. (1880). Description Géographique Historique et Archéologique de la Palestine (in French). Vol. 3: Galilee, pt. 2. Paris: L'Imprimerie Nationale.
- Hütteroth, W.-D.; Abdulfattah, K. (1977). Historical Geography of Palestine, Transjordan and Southern Syria in the Late 16th Century. Erlanger Geographische Arbeiten, Sonderband 5. Erlangen, Germany: Vorstand der Fränkischen Geographischen Gesellschaft. ISBN 3-920405-41-2.
- Palmer, E.H. (1881). The Survey of Western Palestine: Arabic and English Name Lists Collected During the Survey by Lieutenants Conder and Kitchener, R. E. Transliterated and Explained by E.H. Palmer. Committee of the Palestine Exploration Fund.
- Renan, E. (1864). Mission de Phénicie (in French). Paris: Imprimerie impériale.
- Rhode, H. (1979). Administration and Population of the Sancak of Safed in the Sixteenth Century. Columbia University. Archived from the original on 2019-04-20.
- Robinson, E.; Smith, E. (1856). Later Biblical Researches in Palestine and adjacent regions: A Journal of Travels in the year 1852. London: John Murray.
