= Charles-Marie-Napoléon de Beaufort d'Hautpoul =

French military officer (1804–1890)

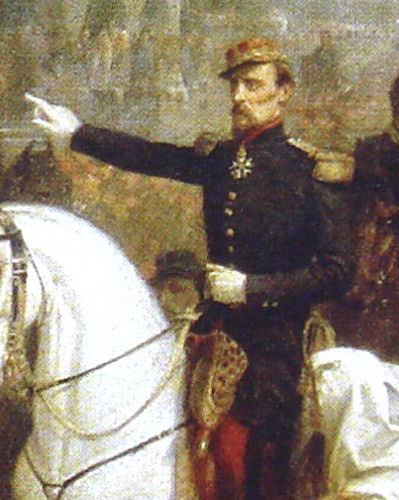
Baudoin Beaufort d'Hautpoul in 1860.

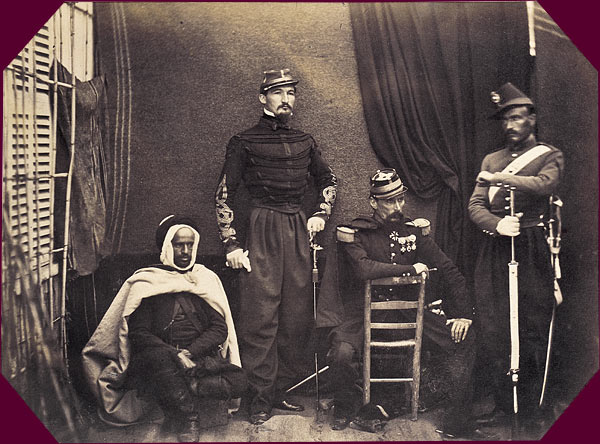
Brigade General Beaufort d'Hautpoul (seated) as commanding officer of the Tlemcen subdivision in the Province of Oran. Standing: staff captain Pierre Séguier. Circa 1856.

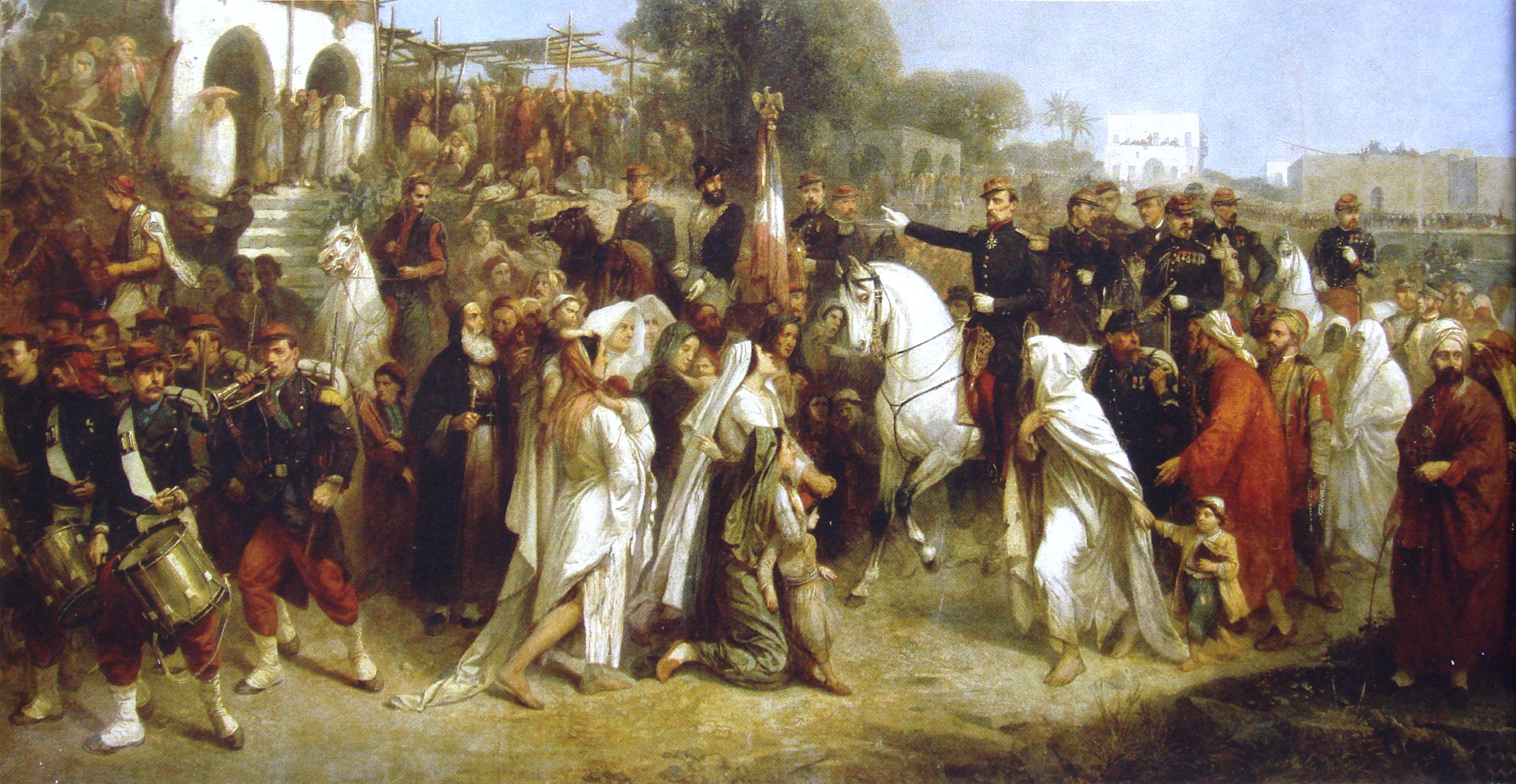
French expedition in Lebanon led by General Beaufort d'Hautpoul, landing in Beyrouth on 16 August 1860.

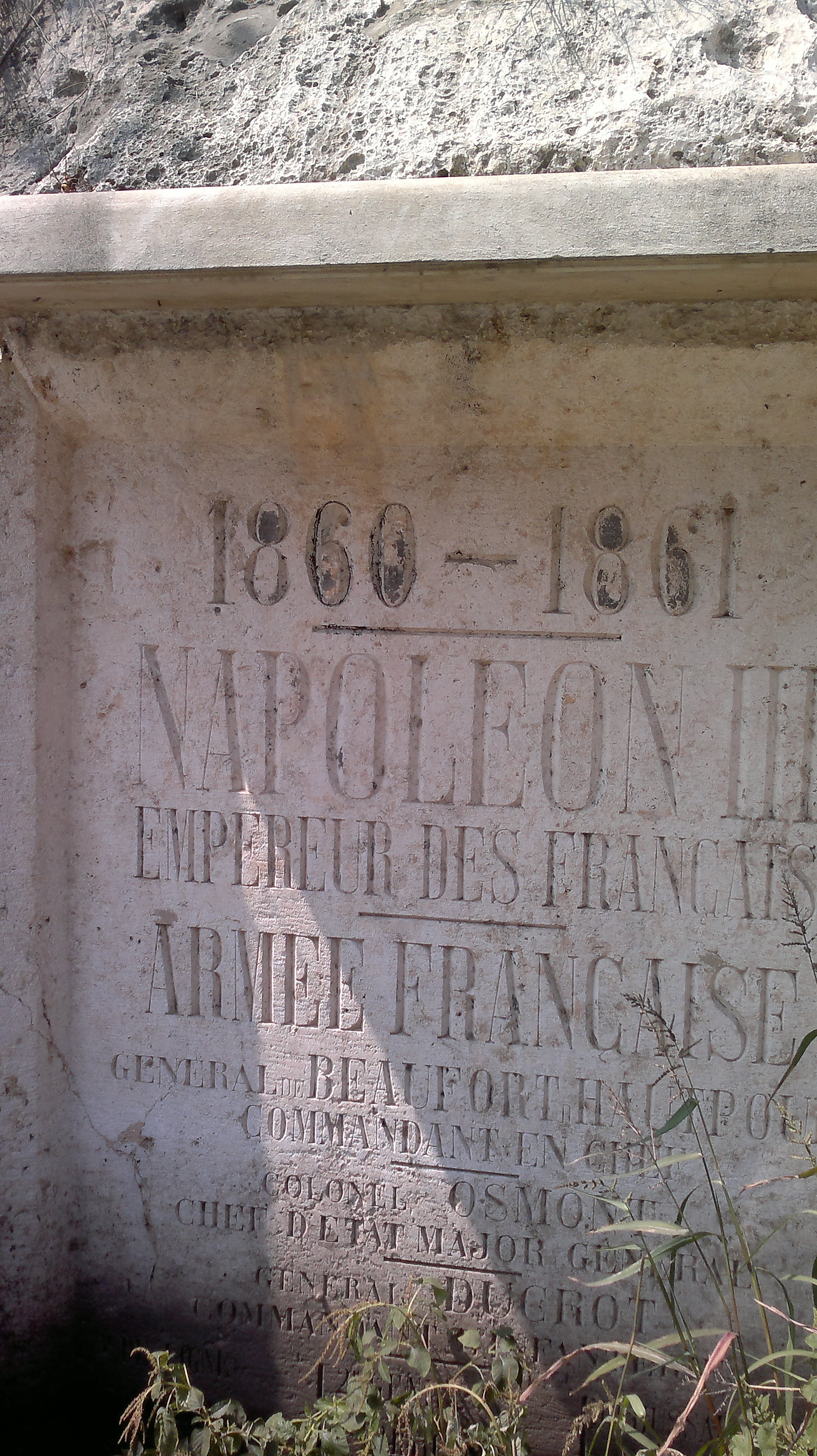
Commemorative stelae at Nahr al-Kalb for Napoleon III and the GeneraI

Charles-Marie-Napoléon de Beaufort d'Hautpoul (9 November 1804, Naples – 18 May 1890) was a French general of the 19th century. He was born in Naples, Italy, where his father served as Colonel in the Génie ("Military engineering"). He entered Saint-Cyr from 1820 to 1824, and ultimately became "général de brigade d'état-major".

He participated with distinction to the Morea expedition in Greece.

In 1830, he participated to the Algiers expedition, as "Aide-de-Camp" to General Valazé.

From 1834 to 1837, he was Aide-de-Camp of French-born adventurer Suleiman Pasha, and then Chief-of-Staff of the Egyptian Sultan Ibrahim Pasha during the Egyptian campaigns in Syria and Lebanon.

He is especially known for leading in 1860, the French expedition in Lebanon in the Ottoman territory, with the agreement of the Ottoman Empire, with the objective to fulfill its mission to protect Christians in the Middle-East, following massacres of Maronite Christians. At that time, France, led by Napoleon III, claimed to continue its ancient role as protector of Christians in the Ottoman Empire.
