= Paul Bovier-Lapierre =

Reverend Father Paul Bovier-Lapierre (1873–1950) was a French Jesuit archaeologist, notable for his work on prehistory in Egypt and surveys in southern Lebanon.
