= Diab =

Diab, Diyap, or Diyab is a masculine given name and surname of Arabic origin. It probably comes from the Arabic word ذئب (wolf). Notable people with the name include:

== Given name ==
=== Diab ===
- Diab Al-Louh (1958–2026), Palestinian politician and diplomat
- Diab al-Mashi (1915–2009), Syrian politician

=== Diyab ===
- Diyab Simon Dabschah (born 1991), German boxer and Islamic preacher
- Diyab Obeid (1911–1984), Israeli-Arab politician
- Diyab Taha (born 2001), Qatari footballer

=== Diyap ===
- Diyap Yıldırım (1852–1932), Turkish politician

== Surname ==
=== Diab ===
- Ahmed Diab (born 1954), Egyptian fencer
- Alex Diab (born 1997), American gymnast
- Ali Diab (born 1982), Syrian footballer
- Amr Diab (born 1961), Egyptian singer and actor
- Assil Diab (born 1988), Sudanese visual artist
- Elias Diab (born 1978), Lebanese photographer
- George Diab, Lebanese actor
- Ghiath Diab, Syrian politician
- Hassan Diab (born 1959), Lebanese politician
- Hassan Diab (sociologist) (born 1953), Canadian terrorist
- Hassan Haidar Diab, Croatian journalist
- Kenainah Diab (born 1948), Syrian children's writer and translator
- Lena Diab (born 1965), Canadian politician
- Maya Diab (born 1978), Lebanese singer
- Miguel Diab (1920–1994), Uruguayan basketball player
- Mohamed Diab (born 1978), Egyptian screenwriter and director
- Mona Diab, American computer scientist
- Najeeb Diab (1870–1936), Syrian nationalist
- Rabiha Diab (1954–2016), Palestinian politician
- Rasha Diab, Egyptian-American academic
- Rashid Diab (born 1957), Sudanese painter and art historian
- Roseanne Diab (1949–2026), South African researcher
- Sima Diab (born 1979), Syrian-American photographer
- Soledad Diab (born 1973), Ecuadorian model and politician
- Yahya Diab, Syrian diplomat and human rights lawyer
- Yussef Diab (1917–1984), Israeli politician

=== Diyab ===
- Hanna Diyab (1688–??), Syrian writer and storyteller

== See also ==
- Diab (disambiguation)
- Dib (name), an Arabic given name and surname
