= Qatar–United Arab Emirates relations =

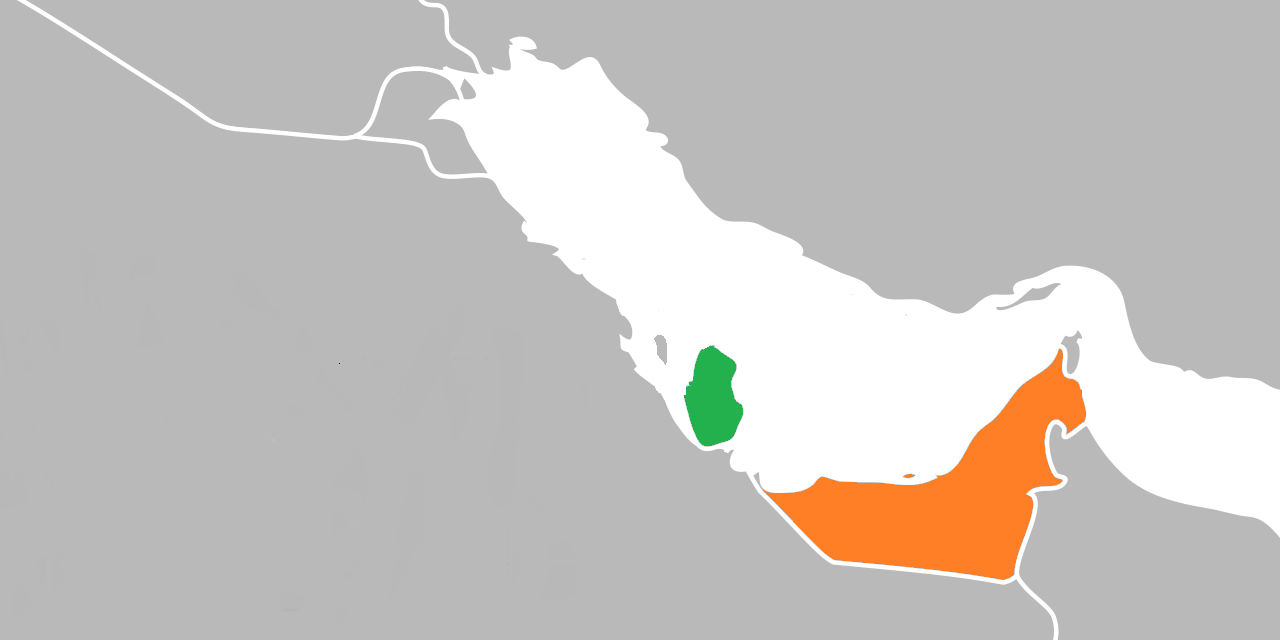

- Qatar: United Arab Emirates

Qatar and the United Arab Emirates share a naval border and are part of the Arabic-speaking Persian Gulf region. They are both members of the GCC.

On 5 June 2017, as part of the Qatar diplomatic crisis, the UAE cut diplomatic relations with Qatar. On 6 January 2021, Qatar and the UAE agreed to fully restore diplomatic ties. On 19 June 2023, the Qatari embassy in Abu Dhabi, a consulate in Dubai, and the Emirati embassy in Doha reopened and resumed work.

== Diplomatic visits ==
=== Visits by Qatar ===
In March 2016, Sheikh Tamim bin Hamad Al Thani visited Abu Dhabi and met with Sheikh Mohammed bin Zayed Al Nahyan (MBZ), then-Crown Prince of Abu Dhabi.

On 1 December 2023, the Sheikh Tamim bin Hamad Al Thani visited the UAE and was greeted by Co-Vice President Sheikh Mansour bin Zayed Al Nahyan in Dubai for the opening ceremony of COP28.

=== Visits by United Arab Emirates ===
In 2008, the UAE President Sheikh Khalifa bin Zayed Al Nahyan, visited Doha where he met Sheikh Hamad bin Khalifa Al Thani, Emir of Qatar. The two leaders set up a joint investment fund.

On 28 November 2014, MBZ visited Doha and met with Sheikh Tamim bin Hamad Al Thani.

Following the restoration of diplomatic relations following the Qatar diplomatic crisis, UAE Prime Minister Sheikh Mohammed bin Rashid Al Maktoum visited Qatar for the 2022 Qatar World Cup opening ceremony on 20 November 2022. MBZ, as President of the UAE, visited Qatar on 5 December 2022 during the World Cup. In 2023, MBZ visited Qatar on 2 October and met the Emir of Qatar to attend the opening ceremony of Expo 2023; and visited again on 5 December to attend the GCC summit in Doha.

== History ==
=== Federation of Arab Emirates ===
In 1968, after the British announced their intention to withdraw from the Persian Gulf region, its former protectorates, which included Qatar, Bahrain and the Trucial States, considered forming a union known as the Federation of Arab Emirates. However, in 1971, both Qatar and Bahrain withdrew from the union, instead opting to declare independence. Six of the trucial states would go on to form the United Arab Emirates the same year, with Ras Al Khaimah joining in 1972.

=== Hamad bin Khalifa Al Thani Coup d'état ===
In 1995, after Hamad bin Khalifa Al Thani deposed his father to become emir of Qatar, UAE granted asylum to the deposed Khalifa bin Hamad Al Thani in a quarter in Abu Dhabi. Sheikh Zayed bin Sultan Al Nahyan tried to mediate between the father and his son, and advised Khalifa bin Hamad to congratulate his son.

The coup affair was revived in 2018 after the Qatar diplomatic crisis with Al Jazeera broadcasting documentaries of new details accusing UAE, along with Saudi Arabia, Bahrain, and Egypt, of plotting to overthrow Hamad bin Khalifa Al Thani and reinstating his father Khalifa bin Hamad Al Thani. According to the documentary, a former French army commander Paul Barril was contracted and supplied with weapons by the UAE to carry out the coup operation in Qatar. UAE Minister of Foreign Affairs Anwar Gargash responded to the documentary and stated that Paul Barril was in fact a security agent of Sheikh Khalifa bin Hamad Al Thani who visited Abu Dhabi and had no relationship with the UAE and the documentary was a falsification to inculpate the UAE.

=== 2014 Riyadh Agreement ===
The UAE, along with Saudi Arabia and Bahrain, withdrew their ambassador from Qatar in March 2014 due to alleged failure by Qatar to abide by an agreement not to interfere in the politics of these countries. The main reason for the dispute was UAE's support for the political regime in Egypt led by Abdel Fattah el-Sisi and Egypt's military elite which contrasted Qatar's support for the democratically elected Muslim Brotherhood, which was deposed following mass protests and a military coup d'état in 2013.

The government of Qatar continued to back the Muslim Brotherhood in Egypt, and Qatar's Emir Tamim bin Hamad Al Thani denounced el-Sisi's election as president in June 2014 as a ‘military coup’. The ambassadors returned to their posts in June.

In September 2014, it was reported that the Emirati government invested US$3 million into a lobbying campaign against Qatar, primarily as a response to Qatar's support for the Muslim Brotherhood. The campaign was aimed at influencing American journalists to publish critical articles of Qatar's alleged funding of Islamist groups. Qatar has also been accused of influencing news outlets, including Al Jazeera, to report unfavorably on the UAE.

It was claimed by journalist Brian Whitaker that the UAE used Global Network for Rights and Development, an NGO to which it has ties, as a political tool. Whitaker claimed that the organization showed favoritism in its 2014-human rights index by ranking UAE at 14 and Qatar at 97. The organization has also taken an opposing stance towards Qatar's hosting of the 2022 FIFA World Cup over human rights concerns. Two of the organization's employees were arrested by Qatari authorities in 2014 while they were investigating the living standards of foreign laborers.

=== Second Libyan Civil War ===
The second Libyan Civil War has been described as a proxy conflict between the two countries, with the UAE backing the secular Tobruk government and Qatar backing the Islamist National Salvation Government.

=== 2017–2021 Qatar diplomatic crisis ===
On 5 June 2017, the UAE, along with Saudi Arabia, Egypt and Bahrain, severed ties with Qatar, accusing it of supporting terrorism. This was precipitated by messages broadcast by the Qatar News Agency in May 2017 which criticized Saudi Arabia and cast Iran and the Muslim Brotherhood in a positive light. Qatar denied that it was responsible for the messages, claiming that its news agency was hacked. The four aforementioned countries censored all Qatari, and Qatari-affiliated news outlets as part of severing diplomatic ties.

In addition to severing ties on 5 June, the UAE also expelled all Qatari nationals living in the Emirates and prohibited its citizens from travelling to Qatar. Furthermore, the UAE closed off its airspace and territorial waters to Qatari vessels.

According to Islam Hassan, a research analyst in Georgetown University in Qatar, "there has been always competition between al-Nahyans of Abu Dhabi and al-Thanis of Qatar. This competition goes back to the 1800s. The Arab uprisings ushered a new chapter in the Qatari–Emirati competition. The competition led to the Emiratis playing a major role in the withdrawal of ambassadors from Qatar in 2014. At the beginning of the current diplomatic crisis, particularly after the hacking saga, UAE was trying to maintain the problem. Yet, Al Jazeera's publishing of Yousuf al-Otaiba's leaked emails got the UAE on board with Saudi Arabia."

In two separate incidents, on 21 December 2017 and 3 January 2018, the UAE was accused by Qatar's government of infringing on its airspace with fighter jets. As a result, two complaints were filed to the UN by Qatar's representative Alya bint Ahmed Al Thani. For their part, the UAE rebuked the allegations, claiming that it had never impeached on Qatar's airspace with warplanes.

On 14 January, Qatari Sheikh Abdullah bin Ali Al Thani, reportedly released a video in which he claimed he was being detained in the UAE by Emirati authorities after being invited to the country by MBZ. Emirati authorities denied that he was being forcefully held stating that he was in the country “at his own behest”. According to UAE authorities, "Sheikh Abdullah had expressed his desire to leave the UAE following which all measures were taken to honour his desire without any reservation".

Another air traffic-related incident occurred on 15 January 2018, when the UAE accused Qatar of 'intercepting' two civilian airliners en route to Bahrain with fighter jets. This was quickly denied by Qatari government officials.

During the 2019 Asian Cup semifinal match between Qatar and the tournament host United Arab Emirates. Some UAE supporters threw bottles and footwears into the pitch; this conduct was preceded by booing the Qatari national anthem. Qatar won 4–0 despite the situation, paving way to their first Asian Cup final and eventual title.

On 12 November 2019, the UAE decided to participate in the 24th Arabian Gulf Cup, which was hosted by Qatar, after initially boycotting it. According to analysts, the participation from the UAE was a signal that the feud between the countries would end shortly after.

On 6 January 2021, Qatar and UAE agreed to fully restore diplomatic ties. In June 2023, both countries reopened their embassies. In July 2023, Sultan Salmeen Saeed Al Mansouri was appointed as Ambassador of Qatar to the UAE. In August 2023, Sheikh Zayed bin Khalifa Al Nahyan was appointed as Ambassador of the UAE to Qatar.

==== Banque Havilland scandal ====
A private bank, Banque Havilland devised a plan to start a financial war against Qatar, after it was hired by the UAE ambassador to the US, Yousef Al Otaiba. A 2017 document containing the plan to devalue the Qatari riyal was prepared by an analyst at the bank, Vladimir Bolelyy, and its copy was forwarded to an official of the Abu Dhabi sovereign wealth fund. Employees at the Banque Havilland referred to the UAE President Mohammed bin Zayed as “The Boss”, who had close ties with the bank owner, David Rowland. In January 2017, the Financial Conduct Authority fined the bank £10 million. It also banned and fined the former London CEO, Edmund Rowland, Bolelyy and a former senior manager, David Weller.

=== The Misfits 2021 ===
The film has been controversial in Qatar after its release owing to some real-life negative references to Qatar to "terror" financing and explicit references to Muslim Brotherhood as "terrorists" with Yusuf al-Qaradawi as their mastermind. A documentary by Al Jazeera, released in August 2021, revealed the United Arab Emirates actively funded the American movie.

=== Qatargate Scandal ===
Qatargate is an ongoing political scandal involving allegations that the Qatari government corruptly influenced some members of the European Parliament, their families and their staff to benefit the Qatari, Moroccan and Mauritanian governments. In July 2022, the Belgian Federal Police announced an investigation into an alleged criminal organization. In December 2022, Belgian police raided 20 locations in Brussels, including offices in the European Parliament. 8 arrests were made in Belgium and Italy, and large amounts of cash were confiscated during the raids. However, Qatar denied any wrongdoing, and accused the UAE of "orchestrating" the scandal against it.

A European Union correspondent Jack Parrock reported "that everyone in the Qatari government believes that the Emirates planned the alleged bribery case against Qatar." Later, a report by Italian news website, Dagospia claimed that the UAE national security adviser Tahnoun bin Zayed gave tips to Belgium, which opened the probe against Qatar.

In 2023, the international investigation series Abu Dhabi Secrets alleged that the UAE had an influence strategy to spy on citizens of 18 countries in Europe and beyond. Using a Swiss intelligence firm Alp Services by Mario Brero the UAE intelligence services allegedly received the names of more than 1000 individuals and 400 organizations in 18 European countries, labeling them as part of the Muslim Brotherhood network in Europe.

=== 2023–2024 ===
In a 2024 conversation between the UAE president, Mohammed bin Zayed Al Nahyan, and the emir of Qatar, Tamim bin Hamad Al Thani, they discussed ways to enhance cooperation and collective action at various levels. Both emphasized the need to intensify efforts for a ceasefire in Gaza and discussed the importance of establishing a fair and stable peace solution for all parties.

== Economic relations ==
=== Energy ===
Qatar, Oman, and the United Arab Emirates are linked by the Dolphin Gas Project, which is the Gulf Cooperation Council's first cross-border refined gas transmission project. The project is developed and operated by Dolphin Energy, a company established in Abu Dhabi. It is the operator of all upstream, midstream, and downstream phases of the project. Dolphin Energy is 51% owned by Mubadala Development Company, on behalf of the Government of Abu Dhabi, and 24.5% each owned by Total S.A. of France and Occidental Petroleum of the United States. During the Qatar diplomatic crisis and the severing of relations between the two countries, the pipelines continued operations.

In March 2019, Qatar lodged a complaint to International Atomic Energy Agency regarding the United Arab Emirates Barakah nuclear power plant, stating that it poses a serious threat to regional stability and the environment. The UAE denied that there are safety issues with the plant, which is being built by Korea Electric Power Corporation (KEPCO), and stated “The United Arab Emirates ... adheres to its commitment to the highest standards of nuclear safety, security and non-proliferation.”

== Resident diplomatic missions ==
- Qatar has an embassy in Abu Dhabi and a consulate-general in Dubai.
- the United Arab Emirates has an embassy in Doha.

== See also ==
- Foreign relations of Qatar
- Foreign relations of the United Arab Emirates
