= Deeb =

Deeb is a common Arabic surname that means "wolf". It may have originated as a nickname for someone who displayed wolf-like characteristics such as courage or fierceness. Notable people with the surname include:

- Abdul Azim al-Deeb (1929–2010), professor at Qatar University
- Abdallah Deeb (born 1987), Jordanian football player of Palestinian origin
- Ahmad Deeb (born 1987), Syrian football player
- Amer Deeb (born 1980), Jordanian footballer
- Dale Deeb (born 1990), South African cricketer
- Freddy Deeb (born 1955), professional poker player
- G. Michael Deeb, Professor of Surgery at the University of Michigan
- Grace Deeb (born 1975), Lebanese singer from Beirut who began her career at the age of fourteen
- Khalid Deeb, professional rugby league footballer
- Loai Deeb (born 1975) Swedish Palestinian politician, leader of Global Network for Rights and Development (GNRD) and a former member of the municipal council of Sola, Norway
- Mahdi Abu Deeb (born 1962), the founder and leader of Bahrain Teachers' Association (BTA)
- Richard Deeb (1924–1990), real estate developer
- Serena Deeb (born 1986), American professional wrestler
- Shaun Deeb (born 1986), American professional poker player

== See also ==
- Dib (name), variant of Deeb
