= Currency intervention =

Monetary policy operation

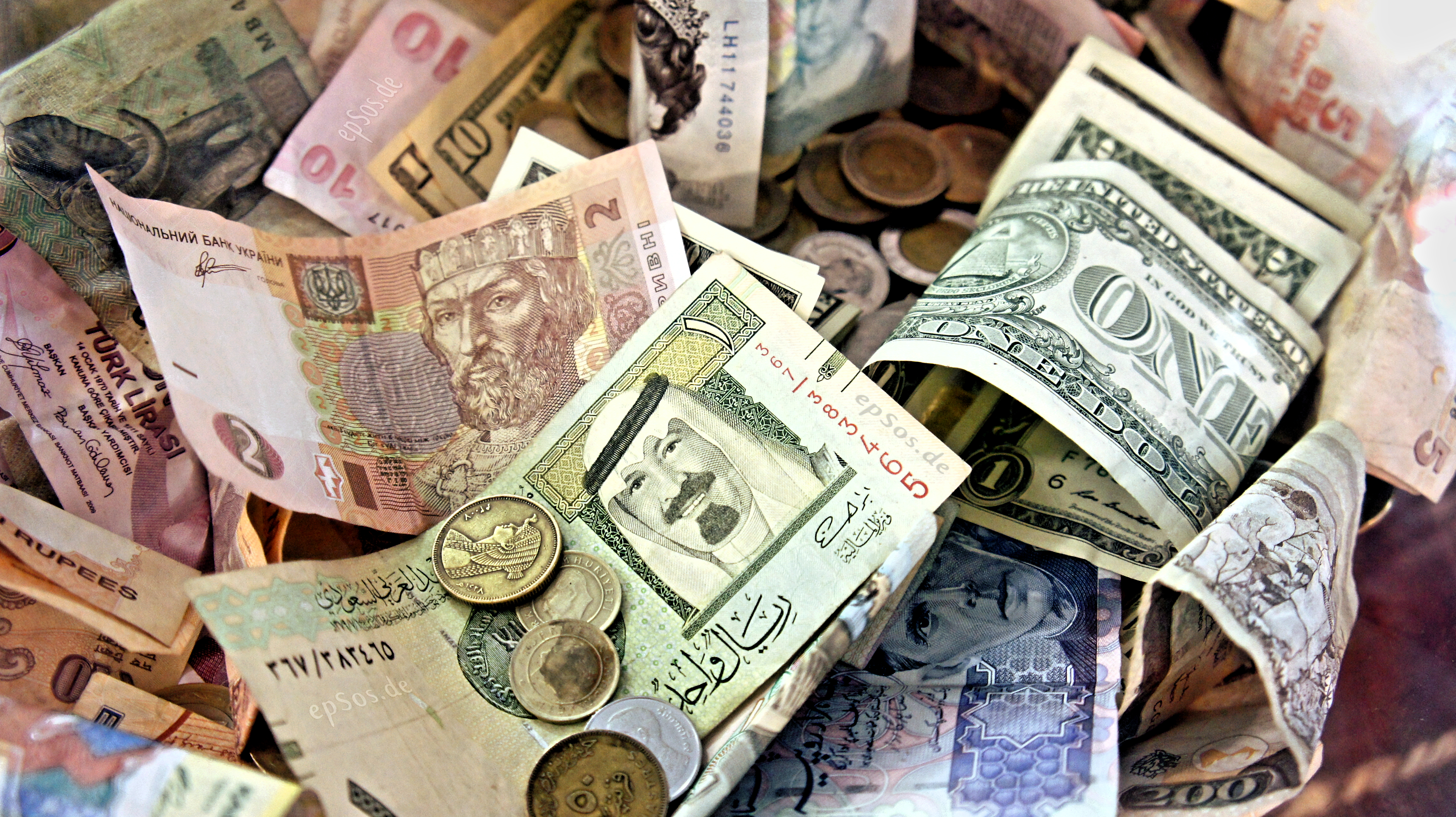
Currencies

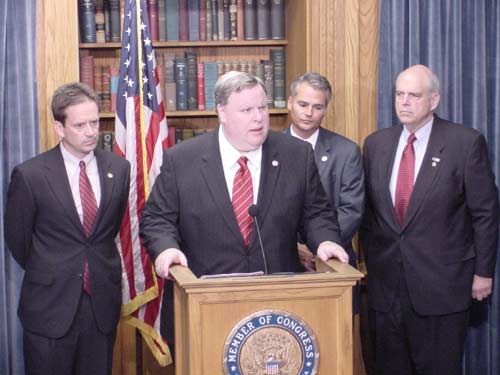
US lawmakers discussing the Currency Harmonization Initiative Through Neutralizing Action (CHINA) Act of 2005

Currency intervention, also known as foreign exchange market intervention or currency manipulation, is a monetary policy operation. It occurs when a government or central bank buys or sells foreign currency in exchange for its own domestic currency, generally with the intention of influencing the exchange rate and trade policy.

Policymakers may intervene in foreign exchange markets in order to advance a variety of economic objectives: controlling inflation, maintaining competitiveness, or maintaining financial stability. The precise objectives are likely to depend on the stage of a country's development, the degree of financial market development and international integration, and the country's overall vulnerability to shocks, among other factors.

The most complete type of currency intervention is the imposition of a fixed exchange rate with respect to some other currency or to a weighted average of some other currencies.

== Purposes ==
There are many reasons a country's monetary and/or fiscal authority may want to intervene in the foreign exchange market. Central banks generally agree that the primary objective of foreign exchange market intervention is to manage the volatility and/or influence the level of the exchange rate. Governments prefer to stabilize the exchange rate because excessive short-term volatility erodes market confidence and affects both the financial market and the real goods market.

When there is inordinate instability, exchange rate uncertainty generates extra costs and reduces profits for firms. As a result, investors are unwilling to make investment in foreign financial assets. Firms are reluctant to engage in international trade. Moreover, the exchange rate fluctuation would spill over into the other financial markets. If the exchange rate volatility increases the risk of holding domestic assets, then prices of these assets would also become more volatile. The increased volatility of financial markets would threaten the stability of the financial system and make monetary policy goals more difficult to attain. Therefore, authorities conduct currency intervention.

In addition, when economic conditions change or when the market misinterprets economic signals, authorities use foreign exchange intervention to correct exchange rates, in order to avoid overshooting of either direction. Anna Schwartz contended that the central bank can cause the sudden collapse of speculative excess, and that it can limit growth by constricting the money supply.

Today, forex market intervention is largely used by the central banks of developing countries, and less so by developed countries. There are a few reasons most developed countries no longer actively intervene:

- Research and experience suggest that the instrument is only effective (at least beyond the very short term) if seen as foreshadowing interest rate or other policy adjustments. Without a durable and independent impact on the nominal exchange rate, intervention is seen as having no lasting power to influence the real exchange rate and thus competitive conditions for the tradable sector.
- Large-scale intervention can undermine the stance of monetary policy.

Developing countries, on the other hand, do sometimes intervene, presumably because they believe the instrument to be an effective tool in the circumstances and for the situations they face. Objectives include: to control inflation, to achieve external balance or enhance competitiveness to boost growth, or to prevent currency crises, such as large depreciation/appreciation swings.

In a Bank for International Settlements (BIS) paper published in 2015, the authors describe the common reasons central banks intervene. Based on a BIS survey, in foreign exchange markets "emerging market central banks" use the strategy of "leaning against the wind" "to limit exchange rate volatility and smooth the trend path of the exchange rate". In their 2005 meeting on foreign exchange market intervention, central bank governors had noted that, "Many central banks would argue that their main aim is to limit exchange rate volatility rather than to meet a specific target for the level of the exchange rate". Other reasons cited (that do not target the exchange rate) were to "slow the rate of change of the exchange rate", "dampen exchange rate volatility", "supply liquidity to the forex market", or "influence the level of foreign reserves".

== Historical context ==
In the Cold War-era United States, under the Bretton Woods system of fixed exchange rates, intervention was used to help maintain the exchange rate within prescribed margins and was considered to be essential to a central bank's toolkit. The dissolution of the Bretton Woods system between 1968 and 1973 was largely due to President Richard Nixon's "temporary" suspension of the dollar's convertibility to gold in 1971, after the dollar struggled throughout the late 1960s in light of large increases in the price of gold. An attempt to revive the fixed exchange rates failed, and by March 1973 the major currencies began to float against each other. Since the end of the traditional Bretton Woods system, IMF members have been free to choose any form of exchange arrangement they wish (except pegging their currency to gold), such as: allowing the currency to float freely, pegging it to another currency or a basket of currencies, adopting the currency of another country, participating in a currency bloc, or forming part of a monetary union. The end of the traditional Bretton Woods system in the early 1970s led to widespread but not universal currency management.

From 2008 through 2013, central banks in emerging market economies (EMEs) had to "re-examine their foreign exchange market intervention strategies" because of "huge swings in capital flows to and from EMEs.

Quite unlike their experiences in the early 2000s, several countries that had at different times resisted appreciation pressures suddenly found themselves having to intervene against strong depreciation pressures. The sharp rise in the US long-term interest rate from May to August 2013 led to heavy pressures in currency markets. Several EMEs sold large amounts of forex reserves, raised interest rates and – equally important – provided the private sector with insurance against exchange rate risks.

— M S MohantyBIC 2013

== Direct intervention ==
Direct currency intervention is generally defined as foreign exchange transactions that are conducted by the monetary authority and aimed at influencing the exchange rate. Depending on whether it changes the monetary base or not, currency intervention can be distinguished between non-sterilized intervention and sterilized intervention, respectively.

=== Sterilized intervention ===
Sterilized intervention is a policy that attempts to influence the exchange rate without changing the monetary base. The procedure is a combination of two transactions. First, the central bank conducts a non-sterilized intervention by buying (selling) foreign currency bonds using domestic currency that it issues. Then the central bank "sterilizes" the effects on the monetary base by selling (buying) a corresponding quantity of domestic-currency-denominated bonds to soak up the initial increase (decrease) of the domestic currency. The net effect of the two operations is the same as a swap of domestic-currency bonds for foreign-currency bonds with no change in the money supply. With sterilization, any purchase of foreign exchange is accompanied by an equal-valued sale of domestic bonds.

For example, desiring to decrease the exchange rate, expressed as the price of domestic currency, without changing the monetary base, the monetary authority purchases foreign-currency bonds, the same action as in the last section. After this action, in order to keep the monetary base unchanged, the monetary authority conducts a new transaction, selling an equal amount of domestic-currency bonds, so that the total money supply is back to the original level.

=== Non-sterilized intervention ===
Non-sterilized intervention is a policy that alters the monetary base. Specifically, authorities affect the exchange rate through purchasing or selling foreign money or bonds with domestic currency.

For example, aiming at decreasing the exchange rate/price of the domestic currency, authorities could purchase foreign currency bonds. During this transaction, extra supply of domestic currency will drag down domestic currency price, and extra demand of foreign currency will push up foreign currency price. As a result, the exchange rate drops.

=== Indirect intervention ===
Indirect currency intervention is a policy that influences the exchange rate indirectly. Some examples are capital controls (taxes or restrictions on international transactions in assets), and exchange controls (the restriction of trade in currencies). Those policies may lead to inefficiencies or reduce market confidence, or in the case of exchange controls may lead to the creation of a black market, but can be used as an emergency damage control.

== Effectiveness ==
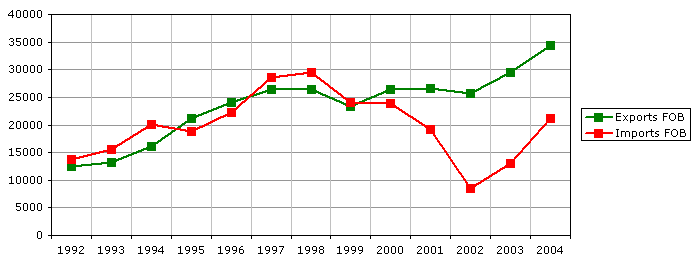
Imports and exports from Argentina 1992 to 2004

The largest empirical study on effectiveness shows success around 80% when it comes to managing volatility of a currency. A meta-analysis based on 300 different estimations on the effectiveness of the practice show that, on average, a $1 billion dollar purchase depreciates domestic currency in 1%.

=== Non-sterilization intervention ===
In general, there is a consensus in the profession that non-sterilized intervention is effective. Similarly to the monetary policy, nonsterilized intervention influences the exchange rate by inducing changes in the stock of the monetary base, which, in turn, induces changes in broader monetary aggregates, interest rates, market expectations and ultimately the exchange rate. As we have shown in the previous example, the purchase of foreign-currency bonds leads to the increase of home-currency money supply and thus a decrease of the exchange rate.

=== Sterilization intervention ===
On the other hand, the effectiveness of sterilized intervention is more controversial and ambiguous. By definition, the sterilized intervention has little or no effect on domestic interest rates, since the level of the money supply has remained constant. However, according to some literature, sterilized intervention can influence the exchange rate through two channels: the portfolio balance channel and the expectations or signaling channel.

The portfolio balance channel
In the portfolio balance approach, domestic and foreign bonds are not perfect substitutes. Agents balance their portfolios among domestic money and bonds, and foreign currency and bonds. Whenever aggregate economic conditions change, agents adjust their portfolios to a new equilibrium, based on a variety of considerations, i.e., wealth, tastes, expectation, etc.. Thus, these actions to balance portfolios will influence exchange rates.
The expectations or signaling channel
Even if domestic and foreign assets are perfectly substitutable with each other, sterilized intervention is still effective. According to the signaling channel theory, agents may view exchange rate intervention as a signal about the future stance of policy. Then the change of expectation will affect the current level of the exchange rate.

== Modern examples ==
According to the Peterson Institute, there are four groups that stand out as frequent currency manipulators: longstanding advanced and developed economies, such as Japan and Switzerland, newly industrialized economies such as Singapore, developing Asian economies such as China, and oil exporters, such as Russia. China's currency intervention and foreign exchange holdings are unprecedented. It is common for countries to manage their exchange rate via central bank to make their exports cheap. That method is being used extensively by the emerging markets of Southeast Asia, in particular.

=== US Dollar ===
As the world's primary reserve currency, currency intervention generally focuses on exchange rate between the US dollar and the target currency. System Open Market Account is a monetary tool of the Federal Reserve system that may intervene to counter disorderly market conditions. In 2014, a number of large investment banks, including UBS, JPMorgan Chase, Citigroup, HSBC and the Royal Bank of Scotland were fined for currency manipulation.

=== Swiss franc ===
As the 2008 financial crisis affected Switzerland, the Swiss franc appreciated "owing to a flight to safety and to the repayment of Swiss franc liabilities funding carry trades in high yielding currencies." On March 12, 2009, the Swiss National Bank (SNB) announced that it intended to buy foreign exchange to prevent the Swiss franc from further appreciation. Affected by the SNB purchase of euros and US dollars, the Swiss franc weakened from 1.48 against the euro to 1.52 in a single day. At the end of 2009, the currency risk seemed to be solved; the SNB changed its attitude to preventing substantial appreciation. Unfortunately, the Swiss franc began to appreciate again. Thus, the SNB stepped in one more time and intervened at a rate of more than CHF 30 billion per month. By the end of June 17, 2010, when the SNB announced the end of its intervention, it had purchased an equivalent of $179 billion of Euros and U.S. dollars, amounting to 33% of Swiss GDP. Furthermore, in September 2011, the SNB influenced the foreign exchange market again, and set a minimum exchange rate target of SFr 1.2 to the Euro.

On January 15, 2015, the SNB suddenly announced that it would no longer hold the Swiss Franc at the fixed exchange rate with the euro it had set in 2011. The franc soared in response; the euro fell roughly 40 percent in value in relation to the franc, falling as low as 0.85 francs (from the original 1.2 francs).

As investors flocked to the franc during the 2008 financial crisis, they dramatically pushed up its value. An expensive franc may have large adverse effects on the Swiss economy; the Swiss economy is heavily reliant on selling things abroad. Exports of goods and services are worth over 70% of Swiss GDP. To maintain price stability and lower the franc's value, the SNB created new francs and used them to buy euros. Increasing the supply of francs relative to euros on foreign-exchange markets caused the franc's value to fall (ensuring the euro was worth 1.2 francs). This policy resulted in the SNB amassing roughly $480 billion-worth of foreign currency, a sum equal to about 70% of Swiss GDP.

The Economist asserts that the SNB dropped the cap for the following reasons: first, rising criticisms among Swiss citizens regarding the large build-up of foreign reserves. Fears of runaway inflation underlie these criticisms, despite inflation of the franc being too low, according to the SNB. Second, in response to the European Central Bank's decision to initiate a quantitative easing program to combat euro deflation. The consequent devaluation of the euro would require the SNB to further devalue the franc had they decided to maintain the fixed exchange rate. Third, due to recent euro depreciation in 2014, the franc lost roughly 12% of its value against the USD and 10% against the rupee (exported goods and services to the U.S. and India account for roughly 20% Swiss exports).

Following the SNB's announcement, the Swiss stock market sharply declined; due to a stronger franc, Swiss companies would have had a more difficult time selling goods and services to neighboring European citizens.

In June 2016, when the results of the Brexit referendum were announced, the SNB gave a rare confirmation that it had increased foreign currency purchases again, as evidenced by a rise of commercial deposits to the national bank. Negative interest rates coupled with targeted foreign currency purchases have helped to limit the strength of the Swiss Franc in a time when the demand for safe haven currencies is increasing. Such interventions assure the price competitiveness of Swiss products in the European Union and global markets.

In late 2022, when the 2022 inflation surge trigged significant inflation in Switzerland, the SNB experienced a turn-around in monetary policies. Rather than buying foreign currencies to lower the value of the Swiss franc, the national bank reduced assets in foreign money to curb imported inflation. After massive over-evaluations in 2019 and 2020, the Swiss franc was "no longer over-valued" in relation to other currencies, which allowed the bank to intervene less.

=== Japanese yen ===
From 1989 to 2003, Japan was suffering from a long deflationary period. After experiencing economic boom, the Japanese economy slowly declined in the early 1990s and entered a deflationary spiral in 1998. Within this period, Japanese output was stagnating; the deflation (negative inflation rate) was continuing, and the unemployment rate was increasing. Simultaneously, confidence in the financial sector waned, and several banks failed. During the period, the Bank of Japan, having become legally independent in March 1998, aimed at stimulating the economy by ending deflation and stabilizing the financial system. The "availability and effectiveness of traditional policy instruments was severely constrained as the policy interest rate was already virtually at zero, and the nominal interest rate could not become negative (the zero bound problem)."

In response of deflationary pressures, the Bank of Japan, in coordination with the Ministry of Finance, launched a reserve targeting program. The BOJ increased the commercial bank current account balance to ¥35 trillion. Subsequently, the MoF used those funds to purchase $320 billion in U.S. treasury bonds and agency debt.

By 2014, critics of Japanese currency intervention asserted that the central bank of Japan was artificially and intentionally devaluing the yen. Some state that the 2014 US-Japan trade deficit — $261.7 billion — was increased unemployment in the United States. Bank of Korea Governor Kim Choong Soo has urged Asian countries to work together to defend themselves against the side-effects of Japanese Prime Minister Shinzo Abe's reflation campaign. Some have stated this campaign is in response to Japan's stagnant economy and potential deflationary spiral.

In 2013, Japanese Finance Minister Taro Aso stated Japan planned to use its foreign exchange reserves to buy bonds issued by the European Stability Mechanism and euro-area sovereigns, in order to weaken the yen. The U.S. criticized Japan for undertaking unilateral sales of the yen in 2011, after Group of Seven economies jointly intervened to weaken the currency in the aftermath of the record earthquake and tsunami that year.

By 2013, Japan held $1.27 trillion in foreign reserves according to finance ministry data. In 2022, in the context of a dollar appreciation, Japan intervened again on foreign exchange markets.

Between July 30 to August 26, 2026, Japan spent a record ¥15.4 trillion ($96 billion) to support the yen, its largest monthly intervention on record.

=== Qatari riyal ===
On August 27, 2019, the Qatar Financial Centre Regulatory Authority, also known as QFCRA, fined the First Abu Dhabi Bank (FAB) for $55 million, over its failure to cooperate in a probe into possible manipulation of the Qatari riyal. The action followed a significant amount of volatility in the exchange rates of the Qatari riyal during the first eight months of the Qatar diplomatic crisis.

In December 2020, Bloomberg News reviewed a large number of emails, legal filings and documents, along with interviews conducted with the former officials and insiders of Banque Havilland. The observation-based findings showed the extent of services that financier David Rowland and his private banking service went, in order to serve one of its customers, the Crown Prince of Abu Dhabi, Mohammed bin Zayed. The findings showed that the ruler used the bank for financial advice as well as for manipulating the value of the Qatari riyal in a coordinated attack aimed at deleting the country's foreign exchange reserves. One of the five mission statements reviewed by Bloomberg read, "Control the yield curve, decide the future." The statement belonged to a presentation made by one of the ex-Banque Havilland analysts that called for the attack in 2017.

=== Chinese yuan ===
Graph of the price of a US dollar in Chinese yuan since 1990

In the 1990s and 2000s, there was a marked increase in American imports of Chinese goods. China's central bank allegedly devalued yuan by buying large amounts of US dollars with yuan, thus increasing the supply of the yuan in the foreign exchange market, while increasing the demand for US dollars, thus increasing the price of USD. According to an article published in KurzyCZ by Vladimir Urbanek, by December 2012, China's foreign exchange reserve held roughly $3.3 trillion, making it the highest foreign exchange reserve in the world. Roughly 60% of this reserve was composed of US government bonds and debentures.

There has been much disagreement on how the United States should respond to Chinese devaluation of the yuan. This is partly due to disagreement over the actual effects of the undervalued yuan on capital markets, trade deficits, and the US domestic economy.

Paul Krugman argued in 2010, that China intentionally devalued its currency to boost its exports to the United States and as a result, widening its trade deficit with the US. Krugman suggested at that time, that the United States should impose tariffs on Chinese goods. Krugman stated:

The more depreciated China's exchange rate — the higher the price of the dollar in yuan — the more dollars China earns from exports, and the fewer dollars it spends on imports. (Capital flows complicate the story a bit, but don't change it in any fundamental way). By keeping its current artificially weak — a higher price of dollars in terms of yuan — China generates a dollar surplus; this means the Chinese government has to buy up the excess dollars.

— Paul Krugman 2010 The New York Times

Greg Mankiw, on the other hand, asserted in 2010 the U.S. protectionism via tariffs will hurt the U.S. economy far more than Chinese devaluation. Similarly, others have stated that the undervalued yuan has actually hurt China more in the long run insofar that the undervalued yuan does not subsidize the Chinese exporter, but subsidizes the American importer. Thus, importers within China have been substantially hurt due to the Chinese government's intention to continue to grow exports.

The view that China manipulates its currency for its own benefit in trade has been criticized by Cato Institute trade policy studies fellow Daniel Pearson, National Taxpayers Union Policy and Government Affairs Manager Clark Packard, entrepreneur and Forbes contributor Louis Woodhill, Henry Kaufman Professor of Financial Institutions at Columbia University Charles W. Calomiris, economist Ed Dolan, William L. Clayton Professor of International Economic Affairs at the Fletcher School, Tufts University Michael W. Klein, Harvard University Kennedy School of Government Professor Jeffrey Frankel, Bloomberg columnist William Pesek, Quartz reporter Gwynn Guilford, The Wall Street Journal Digital Network Editor-In-Chief Randall W. Forsyth, United Courier Services, and China Learning Curve.

=== Russian ruble ===
On November 10, 2014, the Central Bank of Russia decided to fully float the ruble in response to its biggest weekly drop in 11 years (roughly 6 percent drop in value against USD). In doing so, the central bank abolished the dual-currency trading band within which the ruble had previously traded. The central bank also ended regular interventions that had previously limited sudden movements in the currency's value. Earlier steps to raise interest rates by 150 basis points to 9.5 percent failed to stop the ruble's decline. The central bank sharply adjusted its macroeconomic forecasts. It stated that Russia's foreign exchange reserves, then the fourth largest in the world at roughly US$480 billion, were expected to decrease to US$422 billion by the end of 2014, US$415 billion in 2015, and under US$400 billion in 2016, in an effort to prop up the ruble.

On December 11, the Russian central bank raised the key rate by 100 basis points, from 9.5 percent to 10.5 percent.

Declining oil prices and economic sanctions imposed by the West in response to the Russian annexation of Crimea led to worsening Russian recession. On December 15, 2014, the ruble dropped as much as 19 percent, the worst single-day drop for the ruble in 16 years.

The Russian central bank response was twofold: first, continue using Russia's large foreign currency reserve to buy rubles on the forex market in order to maintain its value through artificial demand on a larger scale. The same week of the December 15 drop, the Russian central bank sold an additional US$700 million in foreign currency reserves, in addition to the nearly US$30 billion spent over previous months to stave off decline. Russia's reserves then sat at US$420 billion, down from US$510 billion in January 2014.

Second, increase interest rates dramatically. The central bank increased the key interest rate 650 basis points from 10.5 percent to 17 percent, the world's largest increase since 1998, when Russian rates soared past 100 percent and the government defaulted on its debt. The central bank hoped the higher rates would provide incentives to the forex market to maintain rubles.

From February 12 to 19, 2015, the Russian central bank spent an additional US$6.4 billion in reserves. Russian foreign reserves at this point stood at $368.3 billion, greatly below the central bank's initial forecast for 2015. Since the collapse in global oil prices in June 2014, Russian reserves have fallen by over US$100 billion.

As oil prices began to stabilize in February–March 2015, the ruble likewise stabilized. The Russian central bank has decreased the key rate from its high of 17 percent to its current 15 percent as of February 2015. Russian foreign reserves currently sit at US$360 billion.

In March and April 2015, with the stabilization of oil prices, the ruble has made a surge, which Russian authorities have deemed a "miracle". Over three months, the ruble gained 20 percent against the US dollar, and 35 percent against the euro. The ruble was the best performing currency of 2015 in the forex market. Despite being far from its pre-recession levels (in January 2014, US$1 equaled roughly 33 Russian rubles), it is currently trading at roughly 52 rubles to US$1 (an increase in value from 80 rubles to US$1 in December 2014).

Current Russian foreign reserves sit at $360 billion. In response to the ruble's surge, the Russian central bank lowered its key interest rate further to 14 percent in March 2015. The ruble's recent gains have been largely accredited to oil price stabilization and the lowered intensity of the war in Donbas.

== See also ==
- Exchange Equalisation Account in the United Kingdom
- Exchange Stabilization Fund in the United States
- Open market operation
- Quantitative easing
- Forex scandal
