= DIB =

Dib, dib or DIB may stand for:

== Organisations ==
- Danish International Brigade, a Danish military brigade
- Deutscher Imkerbund, umbrella organization of German beekeepers
- Director of Intelligence Bureau (India), head of the premier intelligence agency of India
- Diyanet İşleri Başkanlığı, the highest Islamic religious authority in Turkey
- Dubai Islamic Bank, an Islamic bank based in Dubai, United Arab Emirates

== Science and technology ==
- Device Interface Board, a component of electronic Automatic Test Equipment
- Diffuse interstellar band, an astronomical spectroscopy term
- Dry ice bomb, a bomb-like device chiefly in non-military/recreational use
- Difficulty in breathing, medical jargon/shorthand
- Device-independent bitmap, a possible file extension of the Windows Bitmap raster graphics format
- Dual independent bus, a computer hardware feature
- Droplet Interface Bilayer, a lipid droplet the forms a bio-membrane at an interface

== People ==
- Dib (name), several people with the given name and surname

== Other ==
- Defense industrial base, a political science and military industry term
- Dib Membrane, a character from the animated television series Invader Zim
- Dibrugarh Airport, Assam, India (IATA code: DIB)
- Dictionary of Irish Biography
- Disability Insurance Benefits, a Title II benefit offered by the US Social Security Administration
- Dib, a variety of the Yelmek language of Papua New Guinea

== See also ==
- Deeb
