= Dib (name) =

Dib (in Arabic ديب or ذيب) is given name and surname.

Notable people with the name include:

== Surname ==
- Alexandre Dib (1929–2012), Brazilian boxer
- Ali Cheikh Dib (born 1972), Syrian footballer
- Billel Dib (born 1989), Australian boxer
- Billy Dib (born 1985), Australian boxer
- Brahim Dib (born 1993), Algerian footballer
- Elias Dib (1945–2021), Lebanese writer and visual artist
- Georges Dib Nehme (1932–2019), Lebanese politician
- Hikmat Dib (born 1956), Lebanese Maronite politician
- Jihad Dib (born 1973), Australian politician
- Juana Dib (1924–2015), Argentinian poet
- Kamal Dib (born 1964), Canadian-Lebanese scholar and writer
- Marcel Dib (born 1960), French footballer
- Mohammed Dib (1920–2003), Algerian writer
- Mohammed Dib Zaitoun (born 1951), Syrian politician and army general
- Pietro Dib (1881–1965), Maronite Catholic bishop
- Shadi Abu Dib (born 1975), Israeli footballer
- Youssef Dib (born 1992), Australian professional boxer

== Given name ==
- Dib Williams (1910–1992), American baseball player

== See also ==
- DIB (disambiguation)
- Diab (disambiguation)
- Deeb, variant of Dib as a surname
