= Jalila al-Salman =

Human rights defender from Bahrain

- جليلة السلمان
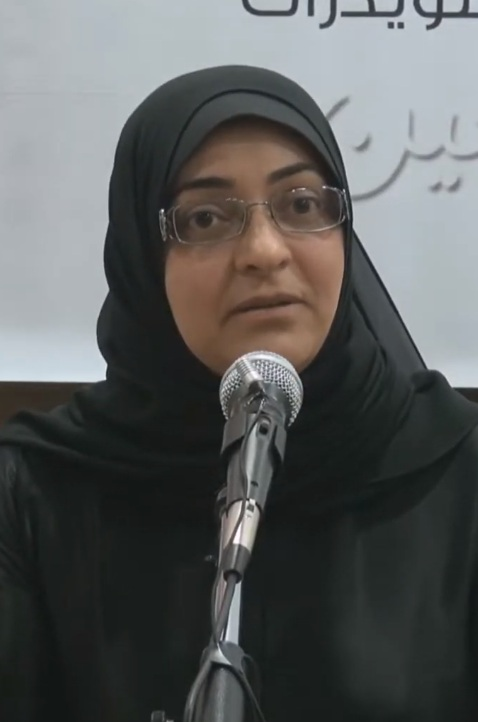
- al-Salman on 6 May 2014
- Born: Jalila Mohammed Ridha al-Salman; 1965 (age 60–61); Bahrain
- Occupation: Teacher
- Criminal charges: Inciting others to commit crimes, calling for the hatred and overthrow of the ruling system, holding pamphlets, disseminating fabricated stories and information, leaving work on purpose and encouraging others to do so and taking part at illegal gatherings
- Criminal penalty: 3 years imprisonment
- Criminal status: Released on bail
- Children: Amjad (eldest son) and two daughters.

Jalila Mohammed Ridha al-Salman (Note: Arabic: جليلة محمد رضا السلمان, romanized: Jalīla Muḥammad Riḍā as-Salmān) (born 1965) is a Bahraini teacher and vice president of the Bahrain Teachers' Association (BTA). Due to her role in the Bahraini uprising, she was arrested for 149 days, allegedly tortured, and sentenced to 3 years in prison. On 21 September 2012, her sentence was reduced to six months' imprisonment by an appeals court.

== Biography ==
Jalila al-Salman worked as an educator for 25 years. According to Human Rights First, she worked to reform the Bahrain education system, and as a result "faced numerous threats and was passed over for promotion". At the time of her imprisonment, she was the vice president of the Bahrain Teacher's Association (BTA).

== Role in the Bahraini uprising ==
In February 2011, large-scale pro-democracy protests began in Bahrain as part of the international Arab Spring. Al-Salman was active in organizing teachers’ strikes in support in February and March. On 20 February, the BTA called for a three-day strike demanding reforms in Bahrain's educational system and protesting the killing and suppression of protesters, of which students made a high percentage. More than five thousand teachers participated in the strike. When martial law was imposed on 16 March, BTA called for another strike, this one lasting ten days. On 16 October, she participated in a symposium organised by Al Wefaq, Bahrain's main opposition party asking teachers to raise their voice and speak about the violation they went through "like doctors".

=== Arrest ===
On 29 March, over two dozen security officers in balaclavas, armed with machine guns and batons, raided al-Salman's house after midnight and arrested her in front of her family, including her three children, while she was wearing her nightdress. "They pulled me from my neck, weapons pointed at my head and asked me not to be afraid, because they were police", al-Salman said. According to her family, al-Salman was tortured while in prison. She reported being verbally and physically abused by security forces who arrested her: "They hit me and called me horrible names. Names I can’t bring myself to repeat."

According to al-Salman, in the first week, she was taken to the Criminal Investigations Directorate (CID) in Adliya, where she was kept in solitary confinement for 10 days, forced to stand for prolonged periods, investigated in harsh conditions and forced to sign papers she was not allowed to read. She was also threatened with sexual assault. Al-Salman was then transferred to Al Qurain military prison where she remained for two months. After that, she was moved to Isa Town female detention center, at which point her family learned her whereabouts. They were only allowed a few visits "under very strict surveillance".

=== Trial ===
Al-Salman's first hearing was at a special military court on 6 June. She was only allowed to see a lawyer for five minutes before the hearing. Al-Salman, along with BTA president Mahdi Abu Deeb, pleaded not guilty to "inciting others to commit crimes, calling for the hatred and overthrow of the ruling system, holding pamphlets, disseminating fabricated stories and information, leaving work on purpose and encouraging others to do so and taking part at illegal gatherings". However, the Judge said their "statements, investigations and technical information are enough to blame them". Their case was postponed to 15 June. They had two other hearings on 22 and 29 June.

The following day, the Ministry of Social Development ordered the dissolution of the BTA, for "issuing statements and speeches inciting teachers and students" and "calling for a strike at schools, disrupting educational establishments, in addition to manipulation [of] school students".

After a three-week hunger strike with another female prisoner in protest of their detention and mistreatment in prison, they were released on bail on 21 August, following a visit by a number of investigators from Bahrain Independent Commission of Inquiry (BICI).

Al-Salman's trial by a military court was postponed from 29 August to 25 September, at which point she and Deeb were found guilty of charges of "halting the education process, promoting hatred of the regime and disseminating fabricated information". A National Security Agency detective testified that both al-Salman and Deeb "had issued statements that led to problems within Bahrain's entire education sector".

Al-Salman was sentenced to 3 years in prison. Deeb was sentenced to ten years' imprisonment. Their appeal hearing was held in a civil court on 12 December. It was postponed to 19 February 2012, when it was postponed again to 2 April and then again to 2 May.

=== Second arrest ===
On 18 October, al-Salman was arrested again in a pre-dawn raid. Arriving in seven vehicles, more than thirty security agents arrested her. Though they stated they were enforcing a court order, they refused to show an arrest warrant. Amnesty International condemned the circumstances of the second arrest as an intimidation attempt and stated its "renewed concerns about her safety in detention". On 1 November, she was released on bail.

=== Responses ===
Al-Salman and Deeb's sentences drew protest from domestic and international human rights groups. Amnesty International protested the sentences, stated that al-Salman and Deeb appeared to be prisoners of conscience, "targeted solely on account of their leadership of the BTA and peacefully exercising their rights to freedom of expression" and called the trials unfair. The organization called for their immediate releases. Responding to al-Salman's second arrest, Malcolm Smart of Amnesty said, "She does not present a serious flight risk but has continued to speak out about her own experiences in detention and the plight of others, leading us to fear that this is the reason for the action taken against her this morning." Human Rights Watch named al-Salman's case among Bahraini government violations of freedom of association. Education International denounced the dissolution of the BTA and the trials of its leaders in a military court, calling on the government to respect basic "human and trade union rights and freedoms of teachers". Following al-Salman's hunger strike, Front Line Defenders expressed their deep concerns for her health and called the government to release her on bail. Trades Union Congress called for al-Salman and Deeb's immediate release and "to hold to account those responsible for their arrest and possible abuse". The British teachers' union NASUWT also issued a statement in support of Abu Deeb and al-Salman, condemning their treatment as "brutal and inhumane".

The Bahrain Centre for Human Rights and the Gulf Centre for Human Rights issued a joint statement that they were "deeply concerned" by the "politicised sentence", also noting that the trial of civilians by a military tribunal was a violation of Bahraini law. Al Wefaq denounced arresting al-Salman at dawn and demanded her immediate release.

=== Appeal ===
On 21 September 2012, her sentence was reduced by an appeals court to six months' imprisonment.

=== Trade union rights award ===
Jalila al-Salman was together with Mahdi Abu Dheeb and the union awarded the prestigious Arthur Svensson International Prize forTrade Union Rights in 2015. This prize, given by the Norwegian trade unions, is presented to a person or organisation that has worked predominately to promote trade union rights and/or strengthen trade union organizing around the world.
