= Jonathan Rowland =

British businessman (born 1975)

Jonathan David Rowland (born 8 June 1975) is a British businessman.

== Early life ==
The son of property developer and banker David Rowland, he was educated at Bedales School, leaving at 16.

== Career ==
He is a co-founder of challenger bank Redwood Bank, and founder and chairman of R8 Capital Investments PLC (formerly Mode Global Holdings PLC).

He is a former chief executive of Jellyworks and Banque Havilland.

He is executive chairman of padel and pickleball venture VVV Sports.

== Relationship with Andrew Mountbatten-Windsor ==
In 2010, Rowland accompanied Prince Andrew, Duke of York, then UK trade envoy, on an official trip to China, where Rowland allegedly promoted the interests of Banque Havilland at official meetings.

In February 2026, The Daily Telegraph reported that in February 2010, while serving as trade envoy, Prince Andrew forwarded a confidential Treasury briefing on the Icelandic financial crisis to Rowland, while he was chief executive of Banque Havilland.
