= Diab (disambiguation) =

Diab is a surname and given name of Muslim origin.

Diab may also refer to:

- Diab, Togo, a village in Togo
- Dataindustrier AB, or DIAB, a Swedish computer firm

== See also ==
- Ain Diab, a commune located at the Corniche of Casablanca, Morocco
- Ain-Diab Circuit, was a Formula One road circuit built in 1957, south west of Ain-Diab in Morocco
