= Hassan Haidar Diab =

Croatian journalist

Hassan Haidar Diab is a Croatian journalist, war reporter and a political commentator of the Middle East affairs. He works for Večernji list. Of Lebanese descent, he came to Croatia at 18.
