= Havilland Hall =

Privately owned estate on the island of Guernsey

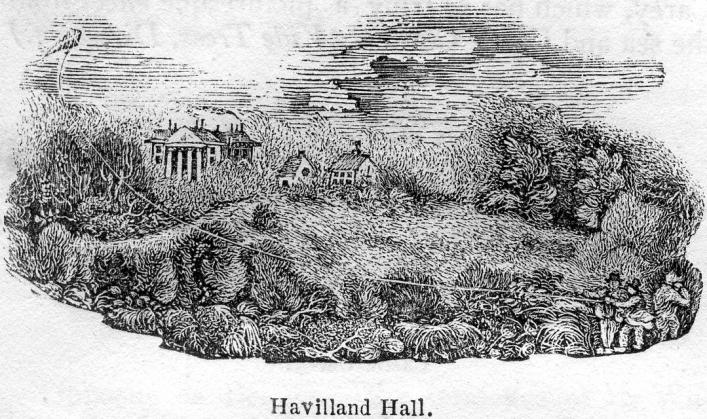
Havilland Hall

Havilland Hall is the largest privately owned estate on the island of Guernsey, and lies close to Saint Peter Port.

A branch of the de Havilland family resided at Havilland Hall for many years. The current house was built in 1830 for Lt Col Thomas de Havilland.

It is home to the British property developer David Rowland, and in 2005 Andrew Mountbatten Windsor, unveiled a life-size bronze statue there of Rowland smoking a cigar in a "vaguely Churchillian pose".
