= Kenainah Diab =

Syrian children's writer and translator (born 1948)

- Born: 28 February 1948 (age 78); Jableh, Lattakia, Syria
- Education: Damascus University
- Occupations: Children's writer; translator
- Organization: Arab Writers' Union
- Title: Diab Kenainah

Kunaina Diab (كنينه ذياب) is a Syrian writer, was born in Jableh, Lattakia, in 1948. She is a member of the Syrian branch of the Arab Writers Union. She graduated from Damascus University with a BA in arts from the Department of English Language and a BA in Mass Communication from the Department of Open Education at Damascus University in 2018. She has written children's stories as well as translations.

== Compositions ==
English translations

- Dawn of the Desert, translated novel, Dialogue House, Syria, 2007.
- Desert Flower, Translated Novel, Dialogue House, Syria, 2008.
- Desert Girls, Translated Novel, Dialogue House, Syria, 2008.
- When the night bird sings: Translated Stories, Arab Writers' Union, Syria, 2008.
- Golden Cadillac: Translated Stories - East and West House, Syria, 2014.
- Dear traitor: Translated Stories, Arab Writers' Union, Syria, 2015.
- If children run the world: Book for Children and Young People, participating in Cultural Bridges magazine, 13–14, Ministry of Culture - Syrian Public Book Authority, Damascus, 2019.

Kids publication and young people.

- Bedtime Tales 90 Stories, Children's Story Collection, Spring Publishing House, Syria 2007.
- Colored Leaves, Children's Story Collection, Spring Publishing House - 2010.
- The Sun Told the Moon, Children's Story Collection, Spring Publishing House, 2010.
- Sham Swimming in Winter, Children's Story Collection, Spring Publishing House - 2010
- Little Flute, Children's Story Collection, Spring Publishing House - 2010.
- Fares farewell to childhood: A Long Story for Young People, Arab Writers Union in Mishq - 2010.
- Letters to my father: Stories of Young and Young People - The League of Arab Writers in Damascus, 2012.
- Tomorrow's shoots: Stories for Children, Ministry of Culture, Children's Publications, 2016.

Children's Story Series, Dar Al-Hafid, Damascus, 2019:

Sinan and Toothbrush, Al Hafid House, Damascus, 2019.

Al-Muhammad House, Damascus, 2019.

Horse cart, Al Hafid House, Damascus, 2019.

I will become a carpenter, Al Hafid House, Damascus, 2019.

Blue Sparrow, Al Hafid House, Damascus, 2019.

Filowla and Al-Muzammar, Dar Al-Hafid, Damascus, 2019.

Benevolent Frog, Al-Hafid House, Damascus, 2019.

The Strange Duck, Dar Al-Hafid, Damascus, 2019.

Ajib Shoe, Dar Al-Hafiz, Damascus, 2019.

Mad Moon, Al Hafid House, Damascus, 2019.

Collection of six stories in Arabic and English:

- Little Squirrel, Shan Publishing House, Amman Jordan, 2020.
- Small Painter, Shan Publishing House, Amman Jordan, 2020.
- Poor Elephant, Shan Publishing House, Amman Jordan, 2020.
- Small Worm, Shan Publishing House, Amman Jordan, 2020.
- Rama and the Book, Shan Publishing House, Amman Jordan, 2020.
- My friend's Sutter : A Story for Young People, Dar Al-Huda Zahalqa, West Bank, Palestine, 2019 .
- Between a butterfly and an ant: Children's Story Collection, Arab Writers' Union, Damascus, 2020.
- Stories published in Osama Magazine, Children's Publications, Ministry of Culture, Syria, 2008–2019.
- Stories and Comics (screenplay) published in Shama Magazine, Children's Publications, Ministry of Culture, Syria 2019.
- Stories and Comics (screenplay) for Children for Qanber magazine, Iraq, 2019, 2020.
- Children's Stories for Jassim Magazine, State of Qatar, 2020.
- Stories for Children for the Moroccan magazine Waz, Ministry of Culture, Morocco, 2019.
- Stories for Children for Qatar Al Nada, Egypt, 2019.
- Stories for Children published in Shalil, published by the Sudan Children's Book Association, 2020–2021.
