= Elias Diab =

Lebanese photographer (born 1978)

Elias Diab is a Lebanese photographer who was born in 1978.

== Career ==
In 1999, Diab decided to pursue his career as a photographer. His work has appeared in multiple Lebanese publications and magazines. In 2000, he was the official photographer of Melhem Karam, Head of the Lebanese Journalist Union .

He started his own company, "Beyond the Image" in 2008.

== Works ==
- Adel Emam Daughter's wedding (2004)
- Garrou concert official photographer (2005)
- Kathem Al Saher concert (2006)
- Laurrent Gerra (2007)
