= G. Michael Deeb =

Lebanese-American cardiothoracic surgeon

- Born: July 25, 1949 (age 77); Pittsburgh, Pennsylvania, U.S.
- Education: University of Pittsburgh
- Known for: Performing the first artificial heart transplant in the state of Michigan Performing surgery on gospel singer Ronald Winans Establishing department of Thoracic Surgery at Temple University Hospital
- Awards: Phi Beta Kappa, National Honor Society, University of Pittsburgh (1971) Charles C. Moore Teaching Award for Residents (1976); Southwestern Pennsylvania Chapter of the American College of Surgeons Award for Best Resident Research Presentation Automatic Implantable Defibrillator (1979); Pittsburgh Academy of Medicine Best Resident Research Award, Physiologic and Pathologic Effects of an Automatic Implantable Defibrillator (1980); W. Embery Burnett Teaching Award, Temple University Hospital, Philadelphia, PA (1982); Alpha Omega Alpha, Honor Medical Society, University of Pittsburgh, Pittsburgh, PA (1992); Dean's Award for Outstanding Clinician, University of Michigan Medical School, Ann Arbor, Michigan (2007) Forest Dewey Dodrill Award for Excellence, Outstanding Clinician, American Heart Association, Detroit, MI (2008)
- Scientific career
- Fields: Thoracic Surgery
- Workplaces: Temple University(1984-1986), University of Michigan (1986-present)

G. Michael Deeb is a Lebanese-American cardiothoracic surgeon. He serves as a Herbert Sloan Collegiate Professor of Surgery and Director of the Multidisciplinary Aortic Clinic at the University of Michigan. He has published 143 articles in journals and books and lectures both nationally and internationally on topics such as valve implantation and cardiac valve implantation.

== Early life and education ==
Deeb received his bachelor's degree from the University of Pittsburgh in 1971 and his Medical Degree from the University of Pittsburgh School of Medicine in 1975. From 1975 to 1982, he was a surgical intern at the University of Pittsburgh in both general and cardiothoracic surgery.

== Career ==
In 1982, he became the assistant professor of surgery at Temple University Hospital and helped to establish the Thoracic Surgery department there. In 1986, he became the assistant professor of surgery at the University of Michigan and became an associate professor in 1991 and a professor in 1996. He was the first to be awarded with the Herbert Sloan Collegiate Professorship. His clinical appointments at the University of Michigan Medical Center include: Director of Heart/Lung Transplant and Artificial Devices Program (1986–1995), Director of Adult Cardiac Surgery (1990–1999), and co-director of Heart Care Program (1996–present).

=== Surgery on Ronald Winans ===
Deeb was head of the surgery team who operated on Ronald Winans. After a failed surgery, he told the assembled Winans family to say its goodbyes, but the family asked if they could pray for Winans instead. Pastor Marvin Winans laid his hands on the surgeon's head, prayed and said, "You go back and take my son off the heart-lung machine. He will live." Deeb was shocked but he complied. Winans lived, and Deeb later said that the experience had brought some spiritualism to his practice.

== Personal life ==
G. Michael Deeb was born in Pittsburgh, PA on July 25, 1949. He married his wife in 1988 and they have two children.
