= Sima Diab =

Syrian-American photographer (born 1979)

- Born: 1 November 1979; Damascus, Syria
- Citizenship: USA, Syria
- Education: University of Texas, US
- Occupations: photojournalist, photo editor
- Years active: since 2006, professional since 2013
- Employer: European Pressphoto Agency
- Known for: Visual documentation of social life in the Middle East and Egypt
- Website: Sima Diab at Instagram

Sima Diab (born 1 November 1979) is a Syrian-US-American photographer, videographer and press photographer who has portrayed the civil war in Syria.

Her career as a photographer started in 2006 and she has been a professional photographer since 2013. Her images have been published in important English-language newspapers, including The New York Times, The Guardian, The Washington Post among others.

Diab was a grantee in the 2015 Arab Documentary Photography Program of the Arab Fund for Arts and Culture, supported by the Prince Claus Fund in cooperation with the Magnum Foundation. In 2022, she was a grantee of the Pulitzer Center and in 2024, she started as Managing Editor at the European Pressphoto Agency (EPA Images).

== Early life and education ==
Diab was born on 1 November 1979 in Damascus, the capital of Syria. She was educated in the United States and Syria, returning to the Middle East permanently in 2002 after finishing her Bachelor’s degree in Communications at the University of Texas. She began to travel in the Near East with her camera in 2006. In 2007 she settled in Egypt and has since been based in Cairo and Beirut.

== Professional career ==
Diab's photographs focus on daily life and social conditions in the Arab diaspora and the Arab world. She has been recognised for her photographic works, considered very personal and committed, of the Syrian Civil War and of the Syrian population.

In 2015 she began a project about refugees on the Serbo-Hungarian migratory route before Hungary closed its borders. She documented the refugee's urgency of finding shelter, finding a new border crossing between Serbia and Croatia, their fear and the embarrassment. The pictures reveal her subjects' uncertainty and need to build another life. In 2016, she participated in a group exhibition titled "Caminos de Exílio" (Paths of Exile) in Madrid, organized by the French Embassy and the French Cultural Institute in Spain for the annual PHotoEspaña festival.

In 2020, she started working as guest editor of the independent media platform SyriaUntold's series on photography, SyriaInFocus. As grantee of the Pulitzer Center she co-published her photos about the impact of climate change on farmers in Egypt in 2022. In September 2023, she documented the 2023 earthquake in Morocco for The Washington Post.

Diab is a member of the Frontline Freelance Register and of the National Press Photographers Association (NPPA). She was appointed Managing Editor at European Pressphoto Agency (EPA Images) in October 2024. Her images are featured on her webpage at Getty Images.

== Awards and recognition ==
In 2015, she won American Photography's Best of Photography 2015 AP32 for her image of a Syrian boy who lost both his legs as the victim of Russian trrops bombing civilians in the Syrian Civil War. The same year, she was a grantee in the 2015 Arab Documentary Photography Program of the Arab Fund for Arts and Culture (AFAC), supported by the Prince Claus Fund and in cooperation with the Magnum Foundation. During this project, she published her image "She as He" about Arab women dressing as men to avoid sexual harassment.

In 2016 Diab won the James Foley Award for Conflict Reporting from the Online News Association. In December 2023 she was awarded the UNICEF Long Term Agreement Photographer Award.

== Selected exhibitions ==
- Viral: Photography in the Age of Social Average, United Kingdom
- EverydayClimateChange: Milan Exhibition, Expo 2015 in Milan
- EverydayClimateChange: Photoville 2015, New York City
- Exhibition Chemins d'exil / Ways of exile. Institut Français Espagne 2016, Madrid
- Cairo Photo Week’s “Depth Off Field” hybrid event, 2021
