= Global Network for Rights and Development =

Former non-governmental organization

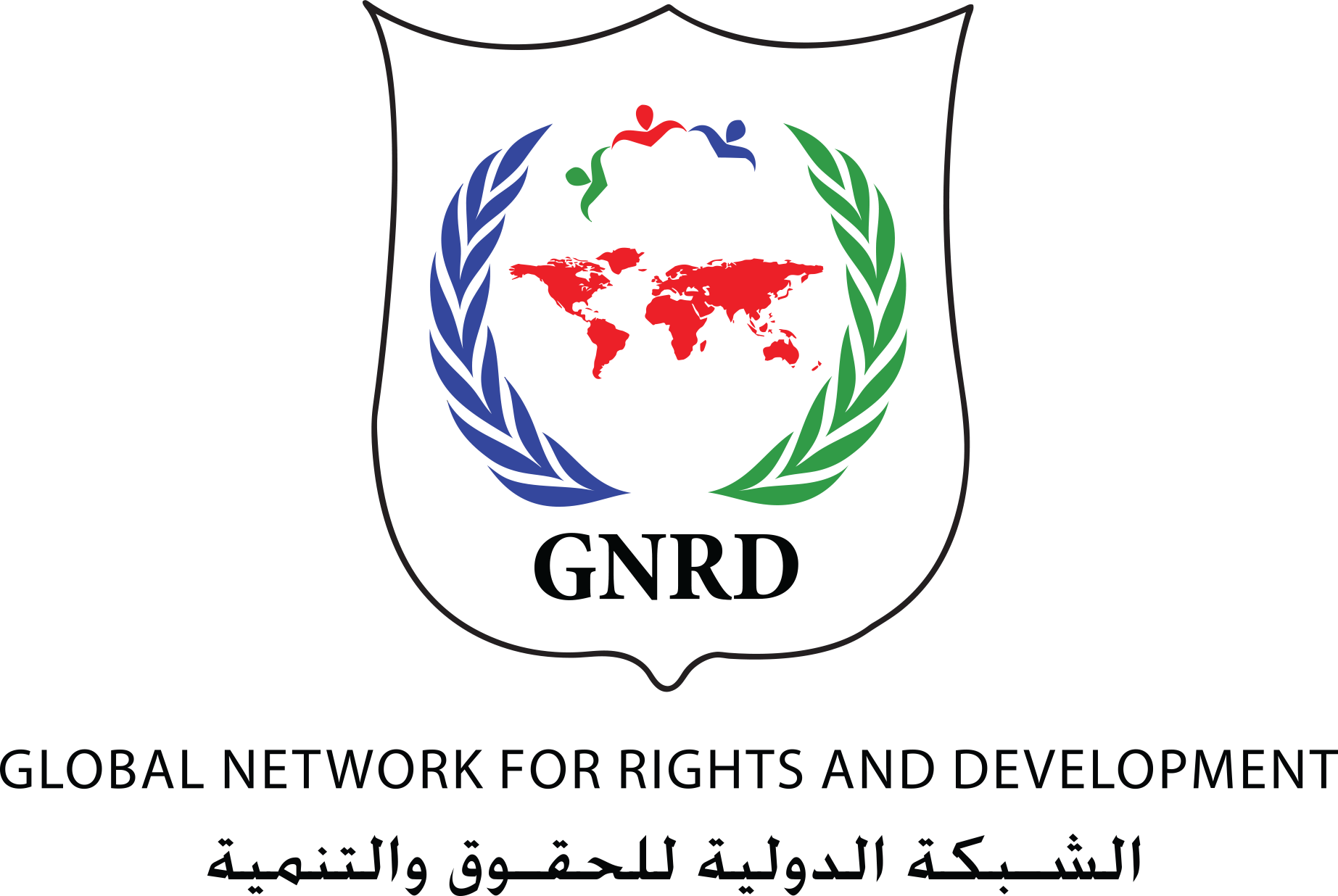
- Abbreviation: GNRD
- Headquarters: Stavanger, Norway
- President: Loai Deeb
- Website: www.gnrd.net

Global Network for Rights and Development (commonly known as GNRD) is a Norwegian non-governmental human rights organization established in June 2008. It was declared bankrupt in 2016. While operational, the organization focused on advancing the rights of refugees, poverty eradication, women's empowerment, and good governance, most notably in the Middle East and North Africa.

== Organization ==
GNRD operated as a research and advocacy organization that worked to advance the rights of disadvantaged and vulnerable persons, primarily by organizing roundtables, debates, and exhibitions at the European Parliament in Brussels, Belgium, and at the United Nations Human Rights Council in Geneva, Switzerland. After establishing its office in Brussels in 2013, GNRD organized of a series of roundtables with Members of the European Parliament focusing on poverty eradication, the rights of children in conflict zones, the role of women in democracy, and the impact of counterterrorism policy on human rights.

According to the European Parliament register, the Brussels office implemented the following consultative committee meetings:

- "Children in Conflict Zones: The Impact of the War in Yemen", a conference held under the joint auspices of GNRD and MEP Ms. Julie Ward, on 23 June 2015.
- “Eradicating Poverty for Social Development”, a conference held under the joint auspices of GNRD and MEP Ms. Elly Schlein, on 21 April 2015.
- “Protecting Human Rights in Counter-Terrorism”, a conference held under the joint auspices of GNRD and MEP Mr Afzal Khan, Vice Chair for the Security and Defence Committee, on 9 December 2014.
- “Tunisian International Observation Mission: Women Working Towards Democracy”, a conference held under the joint auspices of GNRD and MEP Ms. Mariya Gabriel, on 13 November 2014.
- "Children in Conflict: Urgent Humanitarian Aid for Gaza's Youth", a conference held under the joint auspices of GNRD and MEP Mr. Sajjad Karim, on 14 October 2014.
- “International Observation of Egypt’s Constitutional Referendum – Challenges Ahead", round-table and interactive dialogue hosted by GNRD and MEP Eija-Riitta Korhola, on 17 March 2014.
- “The Role of Media in Human Rights and Democracy - Press Freedom", a round-table and an interactive dialogue hosted by GNRD and MEP Eija-Riitta Korhola, on 29 January 2014.
- "Violence against women in situations of armed conflict", on the occasion of the International Day for Elimination of Violence against Women, hosted by GNRD and MEP Ms. Nikki Sinclaire, on 25 November 2013.

GNRD's headquarters were located in Stavanger, Norway, on Kvalaberg Road in the borough Hillevåg. More than 20 employees, mostly of foreign origin, worked in the Stavanger office. In addition to its offices in Norway and Belgium, GNRD also had offices in Amman, Jordan; Dubai, UAE; Geneva, Switzerland; and Valencia, Spain.

The board of directors consisted of Hassan Mousa, Ali Ahmad Abdalla Alananzeh, Shawqi Abdelmajid Issa, Tamam Khalil M J Abushammala, Magdy Elsayed Aly Salim Kaoud, Vice Chairman Abozer Elmana Mohamed Elligai, and Chairman Loai Deeb. In 2014 the website levant.tv claimed that GNRD's Goodwill Ambassador is Carole Samaha.

== Funding ==
It is "funded – to the tune of 3.5 million euros a year". According to the European Parliament transparency register, the operational costs of the Brussels office were between €200,000 and €299,999 for the year 1 January 2014 - 1 December 2014.

In 2014 Brian Whitaker said that "GNRD says most of its funding comes from donations, and its website includes the logos of five "sponsors" who presumably provide at least some of this money. The first of these sponsors is an Emirates-based business called Deeb Consulting and the company's website says its sole proprietor is Loai Mohammed Deeb. It is difficult to identify the four other sponsors since no details are given – only the logos. The logos say "Advance Security Technology", "Kaoud Law", "My Dream" (with the words transliterated into Russian beneath) and "Action Design". Attempts to trace these companies through a Google image search have so far drawn a blank.But as its knowon, 34 % only of UAE companies have website."

== Controversy ==
In 2015 The Jerusalem Post said that "The Palestinian Authority has plans to use an international human rights organization [GNRD] as a front for intelligence gathering and discrediting Amnesty International and Human Rights Watch, according to documents leaked to a number of Palestinian news websites".

=== 2014 arrests in Qatar and claim of links to UAE government ===
In August 2014, two British men of Nepalese origin were arrested in Qatar after travelling there on behalf of GNRD to investigate the living and working conditions of Nepalese migrant workers. The men, Krishna Upadhyaya, a researcher, and Gundev Ghimire, a photographer, were detained without charge for nine days and had to wait a further 11 days for permission to leave Qatar.

Some reports suggested the Qatari authorities had arrested the men because Qatar and the United Arab Emirates were engaged in a dispute at the time and the Qataris believed GNRD was funded by the government of the UAE. In al-bab's online blog Brian Whitaker wrote "While it's possible the men were arrested because Qatar wanted to suppress their findings, it's also possible (and perhaps more likely) that they became unwittingly caught up in a squabble between Qatar and the United Arab Emirates in which their employer, GNRD, is suspected by the Qataris of playing a part". The blog further goes on to criticise GNRD's activities and its leader in detail.

=== 2015 police raid and criminal charges in Norway ===
On May 27, 2015, Norwegian police raided the headquarters of GNRD in Stavanger, Norway. The same day Loai Deeb was arrested and held for interrogation for 48 hours.

Following this Økokrim charged both GNRD and Deeb with money laundering and receiving stolen goods. The vice president of GNRD, Abozer Elmana Elligai, denied the charges.

Following the police raid GNRD and Deeb said they would sue the Norwegian state for financial compensation.

=== Claims regarding publishing of a fake human rights index ===
In a 2014 The World Post article James M. Dorsey said that "an Emirati human rights activist told Middle East Eye: They are supported by the UAE government for public relations purposes. The GNRD published a fake human rights index last year that wrongly praised the UAE".

== Cooperation with other organizations ==
On 13 December 2013 the African Union Commission and GNRD signed a Memorandum of Understanding "to strengthen co-operation and integration".

GNRD is registered with the Transparency Register of the European Parliament and the European Commission. (The website of Gender Concerns International says that on 17 March 2014 at the European Parliament, Eija-Riitta Korhola MEP and GNRD hosted "a roundtable and an interactive dialogue on “International Observation of Egypt’s Referendum - Challenges Ahead".)

In 2015 media said that GNRD "has also entered into agreements with the University of Tromsø and the University of Stavanger, but that now both agreements have been cancelled".

== Conferences ==
- Bahrain Conference from Crisis to Stability, 12 April 2012 - Cairo, Egypt
- International Conference, "Balancing Counter-Terrorism and Human Rights: Challenges and Opportunities"- Geneva, Switzerland on February 16 – 17, 2015.

== International observer at elections ==
GNRD was officially accredited to monitor the following elections and referendums as an international observer:

- South Sudanese Independence Referendum of 14–15 January 2011;
- Jordanian Parliamentary Elections of 23 January 2013;
- Egyptian Constitutional Referendum of 14–15 January 2014;
- Algerian Presidential Elections of 17 May 2014;
- Egyptian Presidential Elections of 26–27 May 2014.
- Tunisia Presidential and Parliamentary Elections in October, November and December 2014
- Egyptian Parliamentary Election of 17 October – 2 December 2015

== Staff ==
GNRD's "founder and president, Loai Deeb, previously set up a fake university in Norway which closed under threats of legal action from the Norwegian authorities. Deeb also uses hundreds of fake Twitter accounts to promote himself and his activities.

In 2012 at the NGO Committee of the United Nations Economic and Social Council the Israeli delegate pointed out that "Dr. Loai Deeb had provided answers to questions posed to three organizations: GNRD, in which he is listed as President; International Coalition against War Criminals (ICAWC), in which he is registered as Executive Director; and The Scandinavian Institute for Human Rights. The groups GNRD and ICAWC were registered with the same address. He asked for an explanation for the relationship between those three organizations and how one individual could manage all three groups".Deeb answered that he cofounded the Scandinavian Institute as a Norwegian citizen, but resigned from the Institute in Nov 2014, and ICAWS had nominated another President in 2011 after the Arab Spring

Anne-Marie Lizin, (d. October 2015) GNRD's "High Commissioner for Europe" was "a discredited Belgian politician" with a March 2015 conviction in appeals court in Liège for electoral malpractice. She appealed the conviction to the Supreme Court; in 2009 she was expelled from the Socialist Party.
