= Loai Deeb =

Palestinian human rights activist

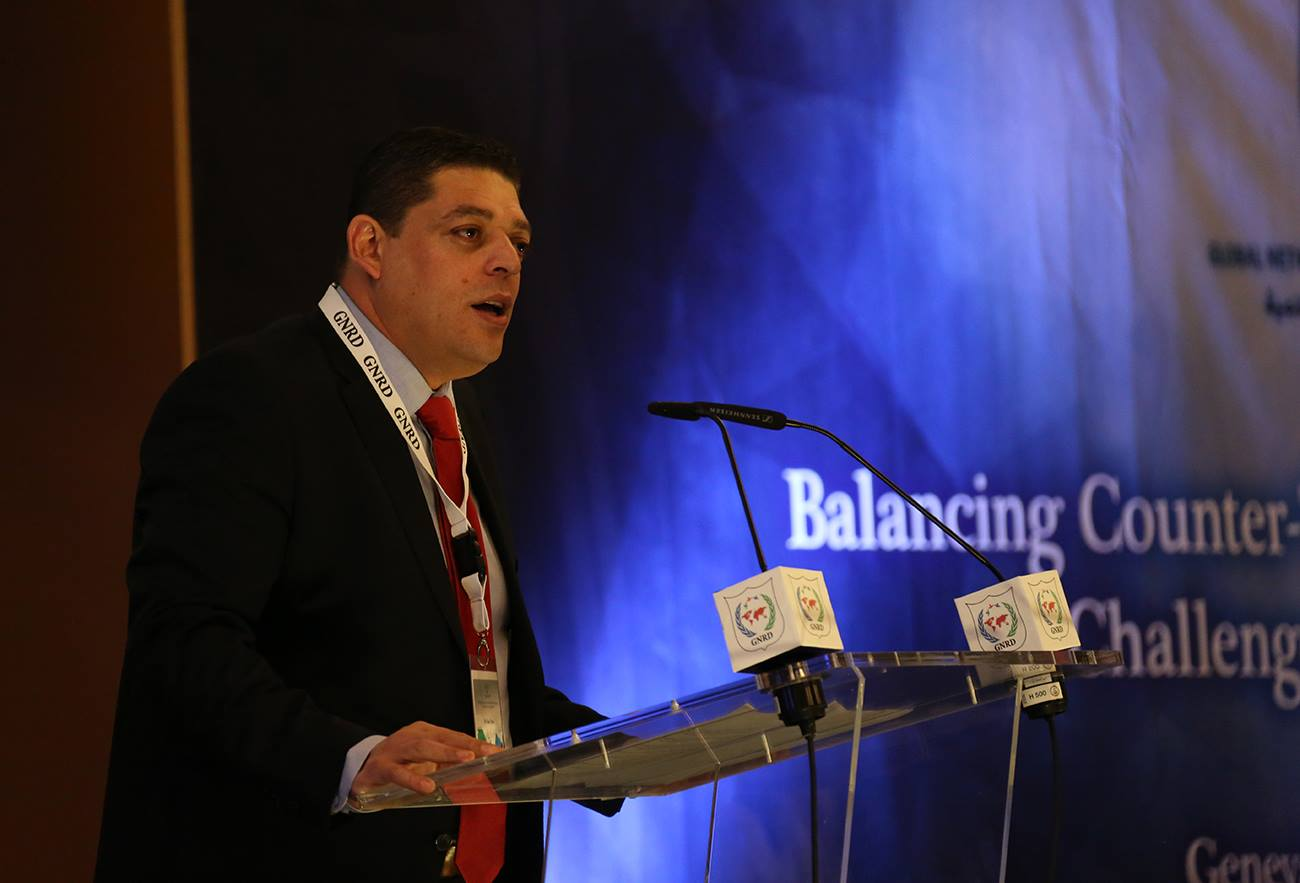
- Loai Deeb speaking at a conference held by the organization that he heads
- Born: July 19, 1975 (age 50); Rafah, Gaza
- Occupation: President of Global Network for Rights and Development
- Children: 5
- Website: Org Website

Loai Mohammed Deeb (born 19 July 1975) is a Palestinian who is the leader of Global Network for Rights and Development (GNRD) and a former member of the municipal council of Sola Municipality in Norway.

In June 2015 Norwegian police charged both Loai Deeb and GNRD with money laundering and receiving stolen goods.

== Career ==
In 2007 he was elected to the municipal council for Sola Municipality in Rogaland county as a member of the Norwegian Labour Party for a period of 4 years.

From 2007 to 2011 he was director of a diploma mill, The Scandinavian University, located in Stavanger with no employees in Norway and without recognition from the Norwegian Agency for Quality Assurance in Education.

Deeb established the Global Network for Rights and Development (GNRD), in 2008.

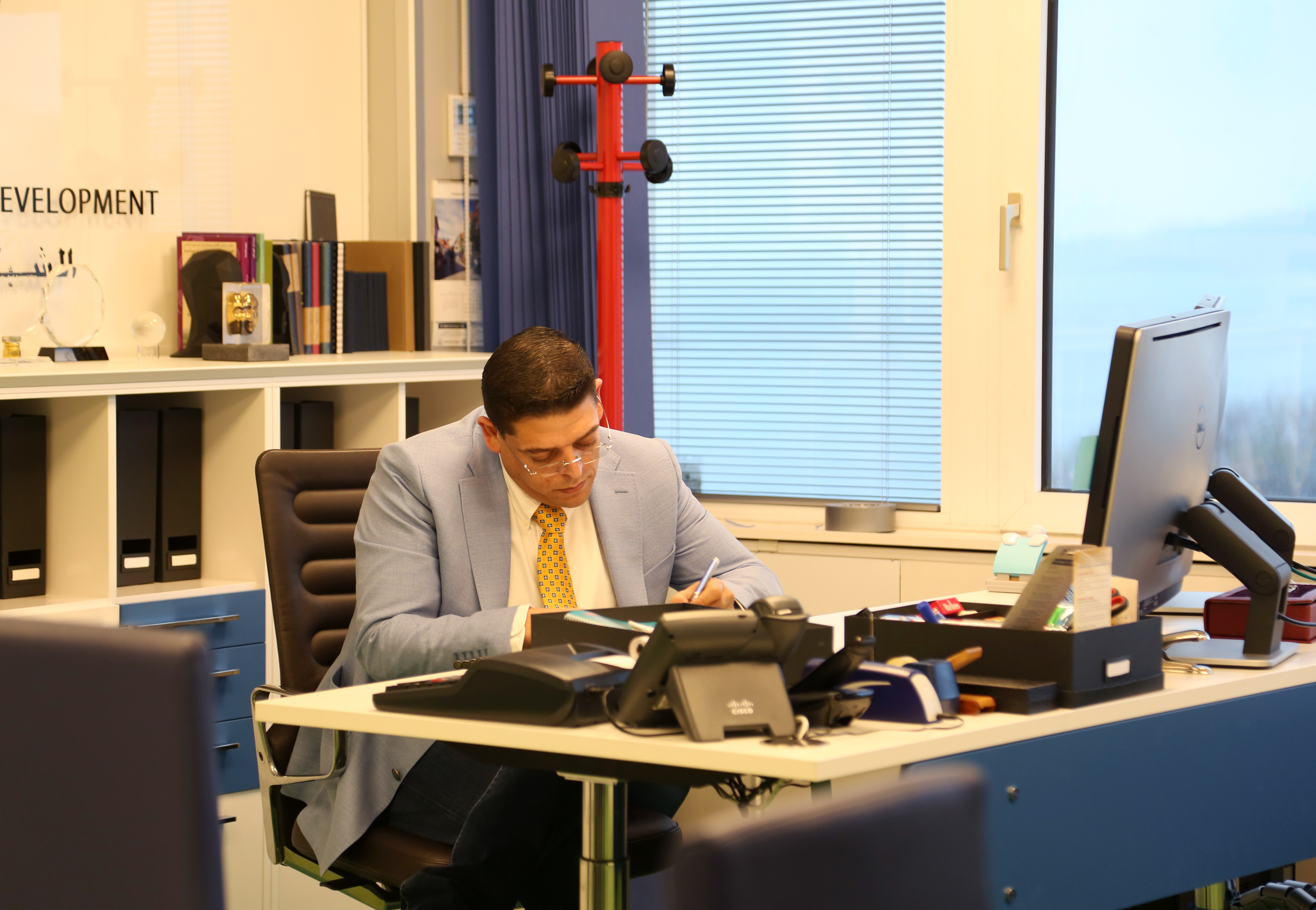
Loai Deeb at main office

In 2013 he earned 4.7 million Norwegian kroner, after years where his yearly income had rarely exceeded 200 000 Norwegian kroner when he had worked as a security guard and as a messenger in Norway.

In 2014 Brian Whitaker said that the organization led by Deeb, GNRD, is "funded – to the tune of 3.5 million euros a year".

In 2014 he produced the video for the song "The Great East", performed by Carole Samaha, the GNRD Goodwill Ambassador.

== Criminal charges ==
On May 27, 2015, Norwegian police raided the headquarters of GNRD in Stavanger and brought Loai Deeb in for questioning. Following the raid Deeb was charged with money laundering and receiving stolen goods. The investigation is carried out by the National Authority for Investigation and Prosecution of Economic and Environmental Crime (Økokrim). Through his lawyer Deeb denied the accusations.

In October 2018, Deeb was sentenced to 4 1/2 years in jail by the Stavanger District Court. Deeb stated he would appeal the sentence.

In December 2019, Deeb was sentenced to 4 1/2 years in jail by the Gulating Court of Appeal.

== Education ==
Deeb's claim to have completed a PhD in international law is disputed. He has claimed that he completed his degree at universities in four different countries on separate occasions, and no major university in any of the four countries have any record of his matriculation. Deeb has no ties to University of Oslo, which contrasts Deeb's claim that he is a professor there.

== GNRD's observing of elections ==
During his period of leadership, the organization has observed elections:

- South Sudan's independence referendum - 14,15 January 2011.
- Jordanian parliamentary election - 23 January 2013.
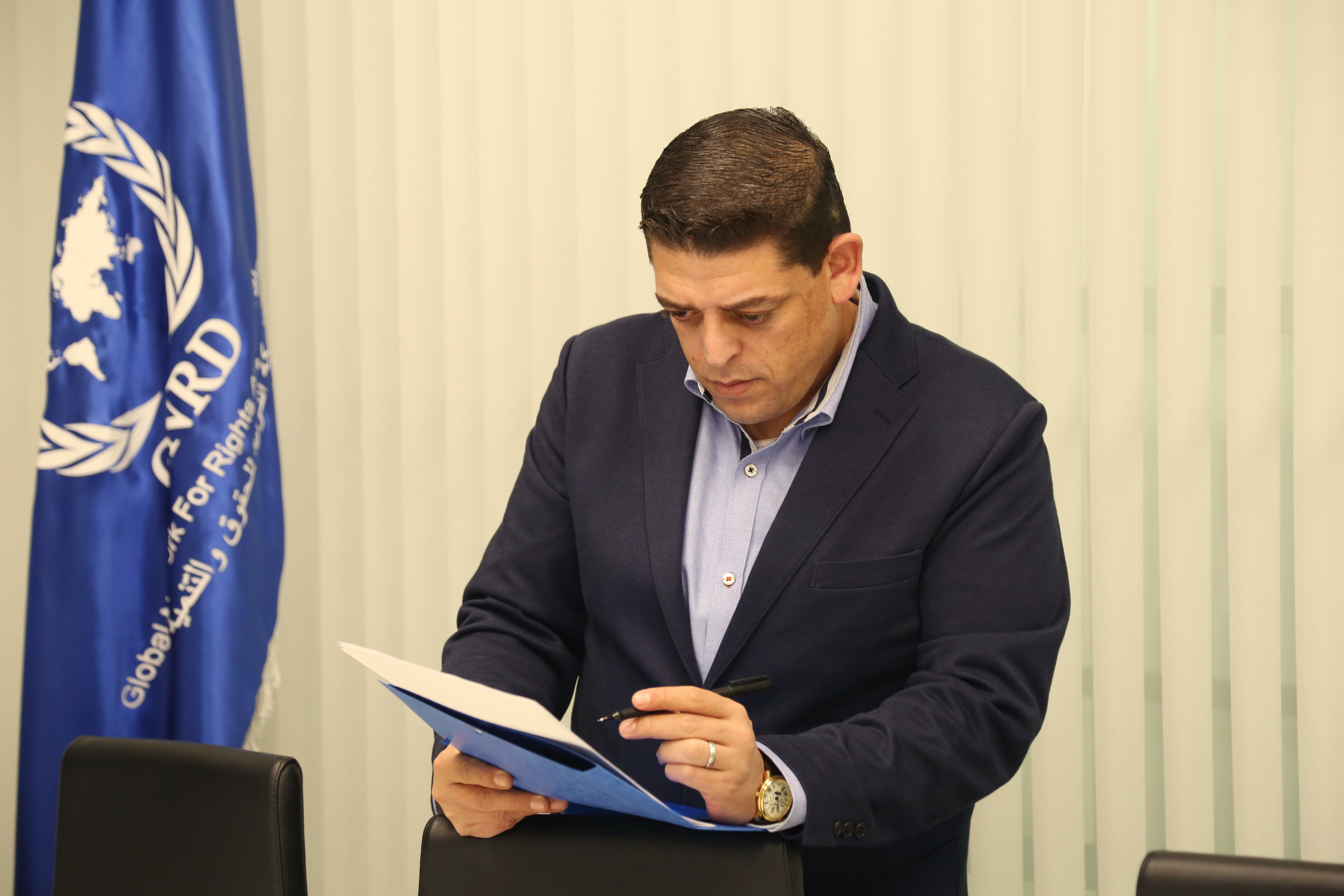
  Loai Deeb
- Algerian presidential elections - 17 May 2014.
- Egyptian presidential election - 26, 28 May 2014.
- Presidential and parliamentary elections, Tunisia - October, November, December 2014.

== Media scrutiny of claims of Deeb's memberships in organisations ==
On 17 June 2015 NRK said that the Wikipedia article about Deeb "claims that he is a member of six organisations including European Academy of rights and Federation of the International Criminal Court. Three of the six organisations" have no traces on the internet.

== Family ==
Deeb is married and has 5 children: one son and four daughters. Deeb also has seven brothers. His father and mother hold Norwegian citizenship, as well as three of his brothers. Another brother holds Spanish citizenship. Two of his brothers live in the UAE and one in Egypt.
