= Rasha Diab =

Egyptian-American academic

- رشا دياب
- Born: Egypt
- Awards: CCCC Outstanding Book Award in Scholarly Monograph (2018); Kenneth Burke Society Book Award (2018)

Academic background
- Education: Ain Shams University (B.A. 1994, M.A. 2002); University of Wisconsin–Madison (Ph.D. 2009)

Academic work
- Discipline: Rhetoric, writing studies, peace studies
- Notable works: Shades of Ṣulḥ: The Rhetorics of Arab-Islamic Reconciliation (2016)

Rasha Diab is an Egyptian-American scholar in rhetoric, composition, writing studies, and Middle East studies. She is the author of the 2016 book Shades of Sulh: The Rhetorics of Arab-Islamic Reconciliation. In 2018, Shades of Sulh was awarded the Conference on College Composition and Communication (CCCC) Outstanding Book Award. Her research interests focus on Arab-Islamic rhetorical traditions, peacemaking and reconciliation, racial justice, transnational feminism, and writing pedagogy. She is an associate professor of Rhetoric and Writing in the Department of English and Middle Eastern Studies at the University of Texas at Austin.

== Biography ==
=== Education ===
Diab attended Ain Shams University in Cairo, where she earned a bachelor's degree in English in 1994, and later a master's degree in linguistics in 2002. In 2009, she then completed her Ph.D. in Composition and Rhetoric from the University of Wisconsin-Madison.

=== Career and professional development ===
Diab joined the faculty of the University of Texas at Austin in 2009 and is an associate professor of Rhetoric and Writing in the Department of English and Middle Eastern Studies. Her teaching and research interests include rhetoric, composition, Arab-Islamic rhetorical traditions, writing pedagogy, and racial peace-making.

== Critical reception ==
Diab published Shades of Sulh: The Rhetorics of Arab-Islamic Reconciliation with the University of Pittsburgh Press in 2016. This book explores the rhetorical aspects of reconciliation in Arab-Islamic traditions and investigates how sulh has been used as a conflict-resolution mechanism in various historical and cultural contexts. It received the 2018 Conference on College Composition and Communication (CCCC) Outstanding Book Award. In a review published in Peitho, Chanon Adsanatham described Shades of Sulh as a pioneering contribution to rhetorical studies, arguing that it expanded rhetorical scholarship beyond traditional Western perspectives by introducing the audience to an Arab-Islamic approach to reconciliation.

== Selected publications ==
=== Books ===
- Diab, Rasha. Shades of Sulh: The Rhetorics of Arab-Islamic Reconciliation. Pittsburgh: University of Pittsburgh Press, 2016.

=== Articles and chapters ===
- Diab, Rasha, Tom Ferrel, Beth Godbee, and Neisha-Anne S. Green. "Making Commitments to Racial Justice Actionable." Across the Disciplines, 10 (2013).
- Diab, Rasha, Beth Godbee, Tom Ferrel, and Neisha-Anne S. Green. "A Multi-Dimensional Pedagogy for Racial Justice in Writing Centers." Praxis: A Writing Center Journal, (2012).
- Diab, Rasha. "Legal-Political Rhetoric, Human Rights, and the Constitution of Medina." Rhetorica, 36, no. 3 (2018): 219–243.
- Diab, Rasha, Beth Godbee, Claire Burrows, and Tom Ferrel. "Rhetorical and Pedagogical Interventions for Countering Microaggressions." Pedagogy: Critical Approaches to Teaching Literature, Language, Composition, and Culture, 19, no. 2 (2019).
- Diab, Rasha. "Transnational Perspective on Ethics." In After Plato: Rhetoric, Ethics, and the Teaching of Writing, 2020.
- Diab, Rasha. "Holding Memory, Reclaiming Time: Women's Biographies and Archives in the Arab(ic)-Islamic World." In The Routledge Handbook of Contemporary Feminist Rhetoric, 2024.
- Diab, Rasha. "Rituals of (Dis) Regard and Mindfulness." Composition Forum, 54 (2024).
- Godbee, Beth, and Rasha Diab. "Because We're Going to Mess Up: Practices for Accountability-Not a Piecemeal Approach." College Composition and Communication, 76, no. 3 (2025): 396–422.

== Awards and honors ==
- 2018 – Conference on College Composition and Communication (CCCC) Outstanding Book Award for Shades of Sulh: The Rhetorics of Arab-Islamic Reconciliation.
- 2018 – Kenneth Burke Society Book Award for Shades of Sulh: The Rhetorics of Arab-Islamic Reconciliation.
