= Diyap Yıldırım =

Turkish politician of Kurdish descent (1852–1932)

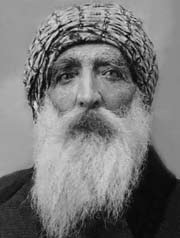
- Portrait of Diyap Yıldırım
- Born: Diyap Yıldırım; April 1, 1852; Hozat, Ottoman Empire
- Died: September 9, 1935 (aged 83); Çemişgezek, Turkey
- Occupations: Military officer, Alevi religious and tribal leader, nationalist politician
- Political party: Republican People's Party

Dersimli Diyap Ağa (Ottoman Turkish: درسیملی دیاب آغا; 1852 – 1932), or Diyap Yıldırım after the Surname Law, was Turkish politician, Ottoman and later Turkish military officer, politician for the Republican People's Party (CHP), and an Alevi religious and tribal leader of Kurdish-Zaza origin. He represented Dersim (later Tunceli) in the Grand National Assembly of Turkey from 1920 to 1923.

== Biography ==
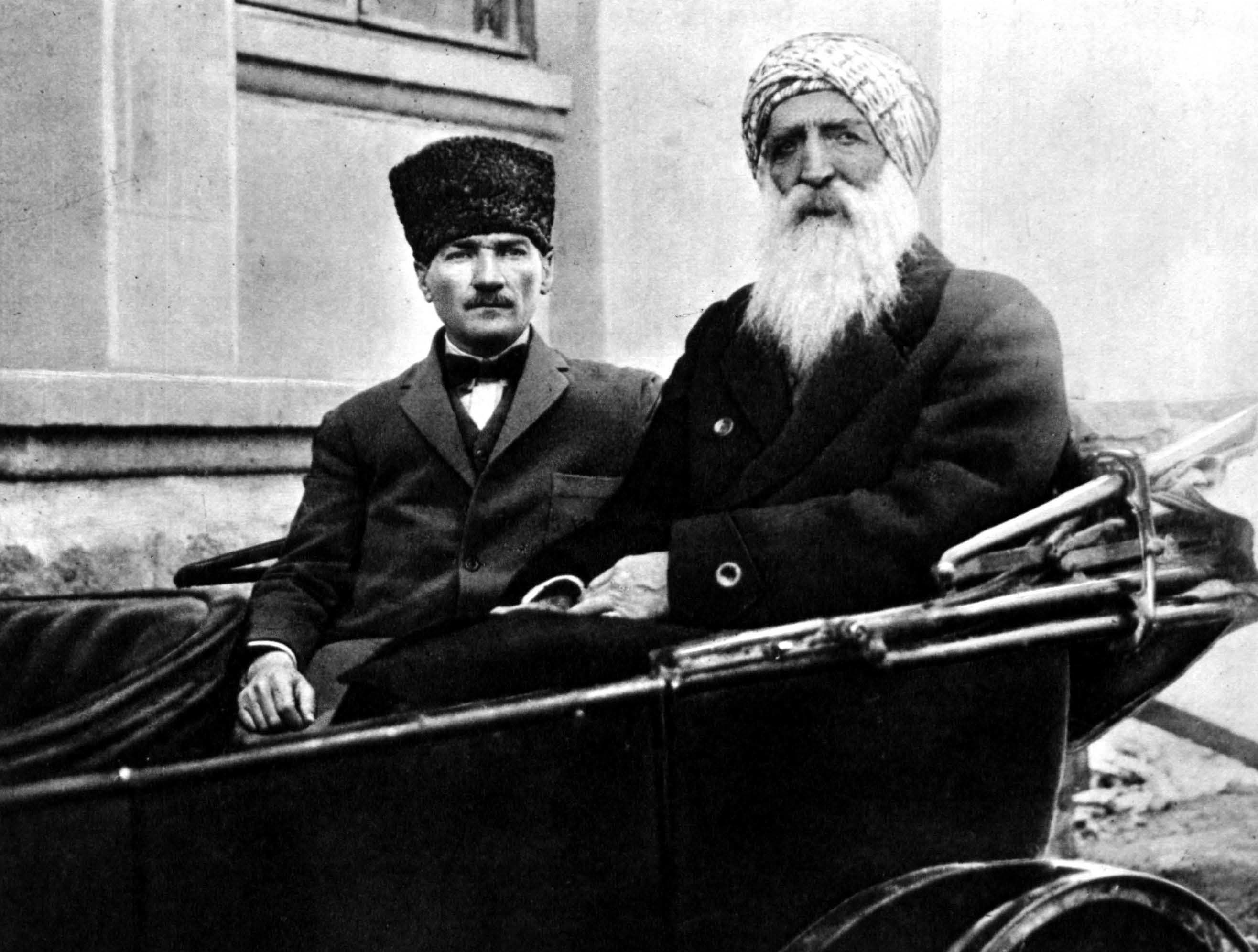
Diyap Yıldırım sitting in a vehicle with Mustafa Kemal Atatürk

Diyap Yıldırım was born in 1852 in the village of Kalecik in the Hozat district of Dersim(in the Bayram neighborhood of Kalecik village, formerly known as Hadişar) as the son of Seyithan Ağa from Hozat, and Elif Hanım. At a young age, he occupied the village of Gözlüçayır in Çemişgezek and settled there. He was from an Alevi Kurdish family belonging to the Ferhatuşağı tribe, one of the Zaza tribes of the Ovacık-Hozat region. Despite being an Alevi, he was a commander of the Hamidiye Corps in World War I. He participated in the war with his tribe to get fight the Russians in Bitlis and Siirt. Around this time, he met Mustafa Kemal Atatürk. Mustafa Kemal Atatürk appreciated his efforts in the Turkish War of Independence and suggested deputyship to the dignitaries of Diyap Yıldırım and Dersim. He was appointed to the parliament with the help of Hasan Hayri. Diyap Yıldırım opposed Kurdish nationalism and the Koçgiri rebellion, Sheikh Said rebellion, and even the Dersim uprising led by his fellow Alevi Kurds. He claimed that Turkey was the sole representative of the Kurds at the Lausanne Conference. He also rejected many proposals for Kurdish independence, claiming that Kurds were obliged to identify as Turks. Although he was a member of the secular Kemalist government, he used his religious credentials and frequently made Islamic statements in support of Turkish nationalism. During the war with the Greeks, he opposed the idea of moving the parliament to Kayseri and on the rostrum of the parliament, stating "did we come here to escape, or to fight and die? If you want to move the assembly, go ahead. But I can't go. Even if I am alone, I will fight to my last bullet for my flag, religion, and homeland. I'll shoot the last bullet in my head. This is how you know."

He was specially opposed to the Sheikh Said revolt and stated "we heard that Sheikh Said rebelled. He came to Elaziz and raided the government. I swear we were surprised! We said 'did he come down from the sky or from the earth'. This traitor. Some of us waited in the hills in defence. We did not abandon Dersim. Everyone will later find whatever they find. There are many goat and sheep thieves here. But there are no traitors. This man was an enemy. He became a rebel to the state. We are the people who are connected to the Republic. In 1890, the British and Russian consulate encouraged us to rebel. They wanted to give a lot of money, we fired them, we didn't take the money."

He died on September 9, 1935, in Gözlüçayır, Çemişgezek, and was buried there.
