= Diyab Simon Dabschah =

German boxer

Personal information
- Nationality: German
- Born: 13 March 1991 (age 35) Landau, Germany
- Height: 5 ft 10 1/2 in (179 cm)
- Weight: Light-heavyweight

Boxing career
- Stance: Orthodox

Boxing record
- Total fights: 27
- Wins: 25
- Win by KO: 25
- Losses: 0
- Draws: 1
- No contests: 1

Diyab Simon Dabschah (born 13 March 1991) is a German professional boxer and islamic preacher.

== Professional boxing record ==
27 fights	25 wins	0 losses
By knockout	25	0
By decision	0	0
Draws	1	
No contests	1	

No.	Result	Record	Opponent	Type	Round, time	Date	Location	Notes
21	Win	20–0 (1)	(Germany) Samy Raid Musa	TKO	4 (10), 2:25	25 Feb 2023	Jugendstil-Festhalle, Landau, Germany	Won WBO Global Light Heavyweight Title
20	Win	19–0 (1)	(Germany) Ibrahim Yildirim	RTD	3 (10), 3:00	7 May 2022	Jugendstil-Festhalle, Landau, Germany	Won WBC-ABCO Light Heavyweight Title
19	Win	18–0 (1)	(Germany) Robin Harwick	TKO	3 (8), 2:11	26 Feb 2022	Elite Boxing Center, Landau, Germany	
18	Win	17–0 (1)	(Pakistan) Yasir Ahmed Malik	TKO	5 (10), 1:17	2 Oct 2021	Universumkino, Landau, Germany	
17	Win	16–0 (1)	(Germany) Ali Hassan Zadeh	TKO	2 (8), 2:02	5 Jun 2021	Black Wolves Haus, Wiesbaden, Germany	
16	Win	15–0 (1)	(Germany) Mirko Sikora	RTD	4 (10), 3:00	26 Sep 2020	Universumkino, Landau, Germany	
15	Win	14–0 (1)	(Argentina) Diego Diaz Gallardo	TKO	3 (10), 0:49	25 Jan 2020	Universumkino, Landau, Germany	
14	Win	13–0 (1)	(Germany) Naqibullah Nazari	TKO	2 (8), 1:45	1 Dec 2019	IGS Halle, Landau, Germany	
13	Win	12–0 (1)	(Germany) Omar Meziane	TKO	3 (8), 2:58	8 Jun 2019	Black Wolves Haus, Wiesbaden, Germany	
12	Win	11–0 (1)	(Germany) Omar Meziane	TKO	1 (8), 2:20	3 Mar 2019	HSV Sporthalle, Landau, Germany	
11	Win	10–0 (1)	(Turkey) Ziya Goekalp	TKO	2 (4), 1:52	16 Feb 2019	HSV Sporthalle, Landau, Germany	
10	NC	9–0 (1)	(Tanzania) Said Mbelwa	NC	7 (10)	16 Dec 2018	Musoma Bar, Dar-Es-Salaam, Tanzania	Originally a TKO win for Dabschah TPBRC changed the result to No Contest.
9	Win	9–0	(Algeria) Reda Amine	KO	3 (4), 1:46	8 Dec 2018	Black Wolves Haus, Wiesbaden, Germany	
8	Win	8–0	(Germany) Ahmad Zaatout	TKO	1 (4), 1:50	3 Nov 2018	Frankenstolz Arena, Aschaffenburg, Germany	
7	Win	7–0	(Syria) Khaled Alhsayan	TKO	2 (4), 1:29	27 Oct 2018	Heimathaus, Neuwied, Germany	
6	Win	6–0	(Germany) Sebastian Tamm	TKO	2 (4), 1:04	22 Sep 2018	Freiheitshalle, Hof, Germany	
5	Win	5–0	(Germany) Ertan Hosses	RTD	2 (4), 3:00	2 Sep 2018	Boxgym, Landau, Germany	
4	Win	4–0	(Kenya) James Kitasi	TKO	2 (8)	17 Aug 2018	Cravers Hotel, Thika, Kenya	
3	Win	3–0	(Germany) Christian Mader	TKO	3 (4), 1:55	24 Jun 2018	Panther Gym, Cologne, Germany	
2	Win	2–0	(Syria) Khaled Ghnaiem Tarakji	KO	2 (4), 2:45	5 May 2018	Nürnberg, Germany	
1	Win	1–0	(Germany) Khalid Shenwary	TKO	2 (4), 2:14	14 Apr 2018	Eleganz Veranstaltung-Saal, Mainz, Germany	

== Personal life ==
Diyab Simon Dabschah was born and raised in Germany. His mother is German and his father is originally from Syria. He is a devout Muslim and has studied Islamic theology, earning a Master's degree in the field. He founded two mosques in the southwest of Germany, where he serves as an imam and regularly delivers sermons.

== Links ==
- Boxing record for Diyab Simon Dabschah from BoxRec (registration required)
