= German Beekeepers Association =

Umbrella organization of German beekeepers

- Abbreviation: DIB
- Formation: 1907
- Location: Wachtberg, Germany
- Members: 120,700 (as of 2018)
- President: Torsten Ellmann
- Website: www.deutscherimkerbund.de

The German Beekeepers Association (German: Deutscher Imkerbund, DIB) is the umbrella organization of German beekeepers based in Wachtberg, Germany. It was founded in 1907 for the purpose of promoting beekeeping and marketing of local honey under the trademark Genuine German honey.
