= Mahdi Abu Deeb =

Unionist and human rights activist

- مهدي أبو ديب
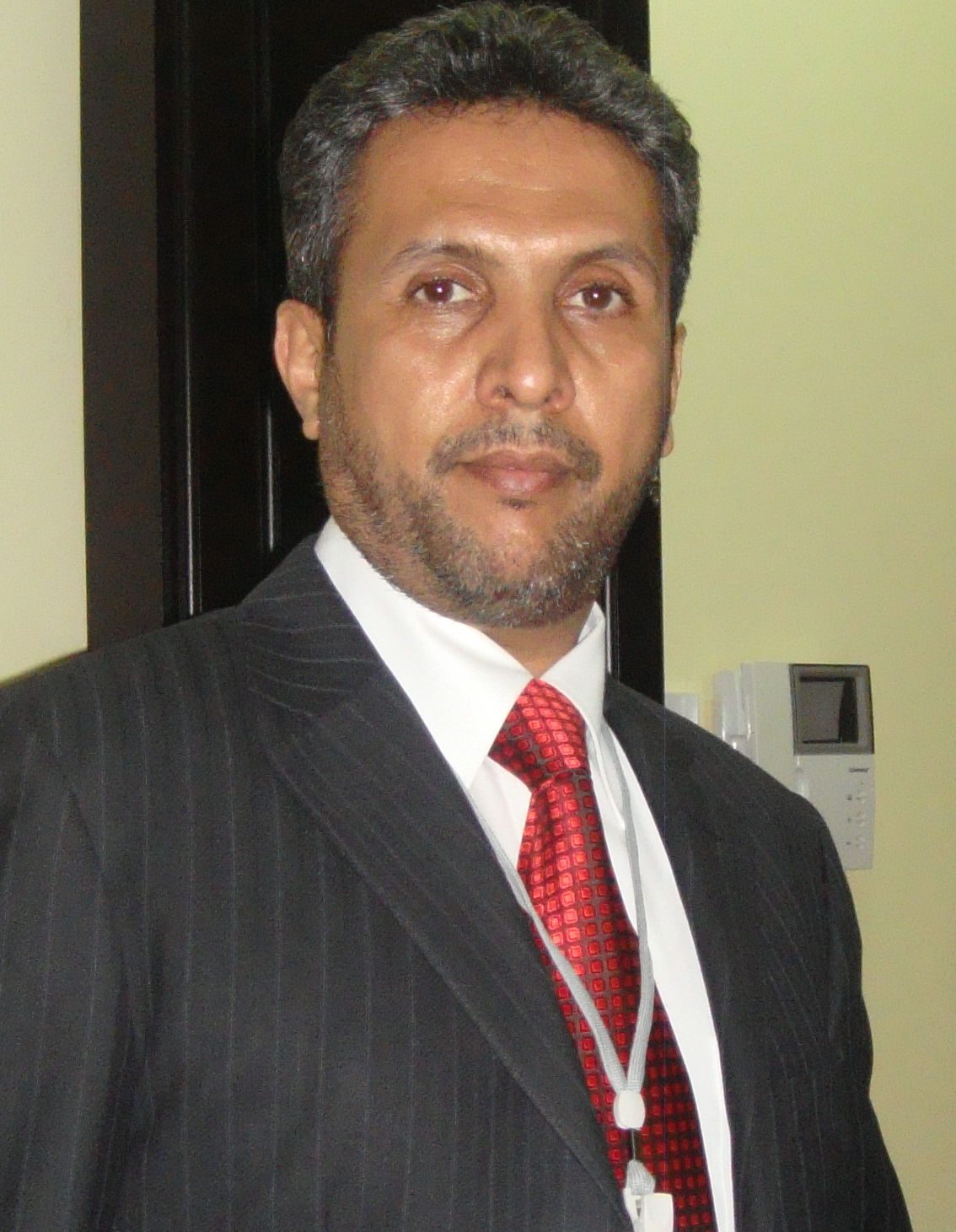
- Personal picture for Mahdi Abu Deeb
- Born: Mahdi Abu Deeb; 30 December 1962 (age 63); Bahrain
- Education: Art at University of Baghdad; PhD in Education at Arabian Gulf University
- Years active: 2001–present
- Children: 3 daughters and a son

Mahdi Isa Mahdi Abu Deeb (Arabic: مهدي عيسى مهدي أبو ديب, romanized: Mahdī ʻĪsá Mahdī Abū Dīb; born 30 December 1962) is the founder and leader of Bahrain Teachers' Association (BTA), and Assistant Secretary-General of Arab Teachers' Union. Due to his role in the Bahraini uprising, he was arrested, allegedly tortured, and sentenced to 10 years in prison. His sentence was later reduced to five years by an appeals court. Amnesty International designated him a prisoner of conscience. He was released on 5 April 2016.

== Biography ==
Mahdi Abu Deeb studied art at University of Baghdad. Later he became a teacher. In 2001, Deeb was promoted by the Ministry of Education to take responsibly for outlining the arts study program and courses offered by government schools. He founded the BTA in the same year to empower teachers' role and equity, and was elected its president. In 2009, he received a PhD in education from Arabian Gulf University. In 2010, he was elected Assistant Secretary-General of the Arab Teachers' Union.

== Role in the Bahraini uprising ==
In February 2011, large-scale pro-democracy protests began in Bahrain as part of the international Arab Spring. During the period between 19 February 2011 and 16 March when authorities allowed protests in the Pearl Roundabout, BTA played an important role in the uprising; they shared demands with the protesters and pressured the government to achieve them. Deeb was there almost daily. "He would leave home in the morning and come back late at night. If he wasn't at Pearl, he was meeting people about schools," his eldest daughter Maryam said. On 20 February, the BTA called for a three-day strike demanding reforms in Bahrain's educational system and protesting killing and suppression of activists, of whom students made up a high percentage. More than five thousand teachers participated in the strike. When the martial law was imposed on 16 March, BTA called for another strike, this one lasting ten days.

=== Arrest ===
External videos
- Front Line Defenders interview Maryam Abu Deeb about police raid and her father on YouTube

Knowing that the government was targeting activists who participated in the uprising, Deeb hid in his relatives' houses. On 20 March, his father's house in A'ali was raided by 30 security officers after midnight; forcing his brother-in-law to guide them to Deeb's house. Finding him gone, they proceeded to interrogate his wife and daughter. According to his daughter, the security officers refused to allow her or hers mother to dress properly before their interrogation. Bahrain Mirror reported that during their raid, police broke down doors and furniture, and confiscated papers and electronic devices.

After seven failed attempts to arrest him, Deeb was finally arrested on 6 April, where he was thrown to the ground from the second story of his cousin's house. He was then allegedly beaten by the remaining group on site and during his transportation to prison. His cousin, Sa'aed Ali Muhanna was also arrested and later released in August 2011.

The following day, the Ministry of Social Development ordered the dissolution of the BTA, for "issuing statements and speeches inciting teachers and students" and "calling for a strike at schools, disrupting educational establishments, in addition to manipulating school students". A military prosecutor also announced that Deeb was accused of "issuing BTS statements inciting hatred of the political regime and violent crimes".

=== Imprisonment and mistreatment ===
Deeb was first held in Criminal Investigations Directorate (CID) in Adliya, then moved to Asri prison, then to Al Qurain military prison and finally to Juw prison. He alleges that following his arrest, he was kept in solitary confinement for 64 days, and that security officials struck him on the head, legs, and back using a hose, also making him stand for extended periods. Deeb also said that beating continued even after being forced to sign papers and confess in front of a camera to committing the allegations made against him.

According to Bahrain Mirror, on 9 April, while being transferred to military hospital, Deeb was beaten and insulted by a military nurse. He was then transferred to Al Qurain military prison. His cellmates, who included Abdulhadi Alkhawaja and Mohamed al-Tajer, reported hearing Deeb get beaten and noticing difficulties in his walk as a result of the attacks. As of 9 April, Deeb had lost about 15 kg and was transferred to a prison hospital where he was diagnosed with kidney damage. Deeb stated that he identified two of his alleged torturers from reading their names and hearing others calling them. On 11 September, Deeb began a hunger strike protesting his detention. His strike lasted for three weeks.

During one of his hearings, Deeb stated that despite being told in prison that his health condition was well, a medical examination revealed he had 2 broken fused ribs, friction in knees, cartilage displacement, fragility of bones and weakness in neck muscles.

== Trial ==
On 25 September, Deeb was put on trial by a military court along with BTA vice president Jalila al-Salman on charges of "halting the education process, promoting hatred of the regime and disseminating fabricated information" as well as "promoting the overthrow of the government by force". A National Security Agency detective testified that both Deeb and al-Salman "had issued statements that led to problems within Bahrain's entire education sector".

Deeb was sentenced to 10 years in prison. Al-Salman was sentenced to three years' imprisonment. On 12 December, Deeb's first hearing at the Supreme Court of Appeal was postponed to 19 February 2012, when it was postponed again to 2 April. In his third hearing, Deeb reported to the judge that he had been tortured, including being exposed to a number of fake executions and electric shocks. The hearing was postponed to 2 May.

On 21 September 2012, his sentence was reduced by an appeals court from ten years to five years. On 1 July 2013, Abu Deeb's request that his sentence not be enforced until his torture allegations were investigated was rejected by the Court of Cassation.

=== Responses ===
Deeb and al-Salman's sentences drew protest from domestic and international human rights and education groups. Amnesty International protested the sentences, stated that Deeb and al-Salman appeared to be prisoners of conscience, "targeted solely on account of their leadership of the BTA and peacefully exercising their rights to freedom of expression". The organization called for their immediate releases, as well as investigation of the claims that Deeb was tortured. Human Rights Watch named Deeb's case among Bahraini government violations of freedom of association. Education International denounced the dissolution of BTA and the trial its leaders in a military court, and called the government to respect basic "human and trade union rights and freedoms of teachers". The British teachers' union NASUWT also issued a statement in support of Abu Deeb and al-Salman, condemning their treatment as "brutal and inhumane".

The Bahrain Centre for Human Rights and the Gulf Centre for Human Rights issued a joint statement that they were "deeply concerned" by the "politicised sentence", also noting that the trial of civilians by a military tribunal was a violation of Bahraini law. On 7 January 2012, A number of Bahrain opposition political parties organized a sit-in expressing solidarity with Deeb and demanding his immediate release "as the Bahrain Independent Commission of Inquiry report has recommended". The Arab Teachers' Union demanded Deeb's immediate release, asking the government to respect international laws.

On 15 March 2012, the Parliament of the European Union called for "the immediate and unconditional release of all peaceful demonstrators, political activists, human rights defenders, doctors and paramedics, bloggers and journalists" in Bahrain, naming Deeb's case as a specific example of a prisoner who had "been detained or convicted for exercising their rights to freedom of expression, association and peaceful assembly or complying with their professional obligations". The Office of the United Nations High Commissioner for Human Rights also began an inquiry into Deeb's case, to which a Bahraini ambassador responded by enumerating the charges against Deeb and noting that he had "been afforded all judicial guarantees" and had the right to an appeal. The Office's Special Rapporteur on torture described this response as insufficient, noting that the Bahraini government's formal response "did not address the allegation of torture or ill-treatment at all".

Deeb's daughter Maryam has actively campaigned for her father's release through a Twitter account.

=== Release ===
Deeb was released from jail on 5 April 2016, after serving five years.
