= Banque Havilland =

Luxembourg private bank

Blastline
- Company type: Private Company
- Industry: Financial services
- Founded: July 10, 2009
- Headquarters: Luxembourg
- Number of locations: 6
- Key people: David Rowland (Owner); Marc Arand (Group CEO)
- Services: Private banking Asset management Wealth management Investment fund Trading
- Number of employees: 200 (Luxembourg)
- Website: www.banquehavilland.com

Banque Havilland S.A. was a private bank headquartered in Luxembourg. It was owned by the Rowland family and provided services in private banking, wealth and asset management, fund services to private clients and institutions. Banque Havilland had five offices located in Luxembourg, Liechtenstein, Monaco, the United Arab Emirates and Switzerland.

On 9 August 2024, the Luxembourg District Court placed the bank in administration.

== History ==
Banque Havilland obtained a banking licence in Luxembourg in 2009. David Rowland and his son Jonathan achieved this by obtaining the good bank of the failed Kaupthing Bank Luxembourg via their investment company Blackfish Capital. The bad bank was renamed Pillar Securitisation, for which Havilland acted as administrator. It was named after Rowland's Havilland Hall mansion in Guernsey.

It opened its first overseas entity in Monaco by acquiring Dexia Private Bank S.A.M. from Dexia Banque Internationale à Luxembourg in 2012. A year later, in 2013, it launched its London branch and acquired a majority stake in Banque Pasche (Liechtenstein) AG and 100% of shares in Pasche Bank & Trust Limited forming two new subsidiaries Banque Havilland (Liechtenstein) AG.

In 2016, Banque Havilland acquired Banque Pasche S.A. in Switzerland allowing it to start operating in Switzerland, in Zurich. Moreover, through its acquisition of Banco Popolare Luxembourg S.A. from Banco Popolare, the bank extended its services to institutional clients.

In 2018, the bank was fined €4 million for breaches of money-laundering regulations. In 2023, the bank’s British subsidiary was shut down by regulators. In 2023, Banque Havilland announced the sale of its institutional banking activities to Banco Inversis, a subsidiary of Spanish investment bank Banca March.

In early August 2024, the European Central Bank withdrew Banque Havilland’s operating licence, stopping it trading in most of Europe. On 9 August 2024, the Luxembourg District Court placed the bank in administration.

== Controversy ==
=== Links to Prince Andrew ===
In November 2020, following reviews of emails, internal documents, and unreported regulatory filings, as well as interviews with former bank insiders, Bloomberg Businessweek reported that Prince Andrew, Duke of York had used his royal status and his role as UK trade envoy to assist David Rowland and Banque Havilland, in securing clients around the world. The Rowland family were among Andrew's investment advisers, and he attended the bank's official opening ceremony in July 2009.

In November 2017, Andrew borrowed £250,000 from Banque Havilland, adding to an existing £1.25 million loan that had been "extended or increased 10 times" since 2015. Documents indicated that although the "credibility of the applicant" had been questioned, the loan was approved in an effort to "further business potential with the Royal Family". Eleven days later, in December 2017, £1.5 million was transferred from an account at Albany Reserves – controlled by the Rowland family – to Andrew's account at Banque Havilland, paying off the loan due in March 2018.

In February 2026, The Daily Telegraph claimed that in February 2010, while trade envoy, Prince Andrew forwarded a confidential Treasury briefing about the Icelandic financial crisis to Banque Havilland chief executive Jonathan Rowland.

=== 2017 Qatar diplomatic crisis ===
In November 2017, leaked emails purported to show that Yousef Al Otaiba, ambassador of the United Arab Emirates to the United States, had hired Banque Havilland to draw up a plan on how to start a financial war against Qatar. The bank has denied the allegations of overseas currency manipulation.

In January 2023, the Financial Conduct Authority issued notices to Banque Havilland, its former London CEO, Edmund Rowland, and two other former employees for their role in the 2017 plan that targeted the financial system of Qatar. The FCA fined Banque Havilland £10 million. David Rowland’s son, Edmund Rowland was also banned and fined £352,000. An analyst with the bank, Vladimir Bolelyy created a presentation with “manipulative trading strategies” that aimed at devaluing the Qatari riyal. The watchdog censored and fined Bolelyy £14,200. A former senior manager at the bank, David Weller also received an FCA notice, which banned and fined him £54,000 for contributing significantly to the document prepared by the bank. A copy of the document, which was disseminated by Edmund Rowland and Bolelyy, was also provided to an official of the Abu Dhabi sovereign wealth fund. David Rowland maintained good relationship with the UAE President Mohammed bin Zayed, who was known as “The Boss” at Banque Havilland.

== See also ==
- List of banks in Luxembourg
