= Diyab Obeid =

Arab- Israeli politician (1911–1984)

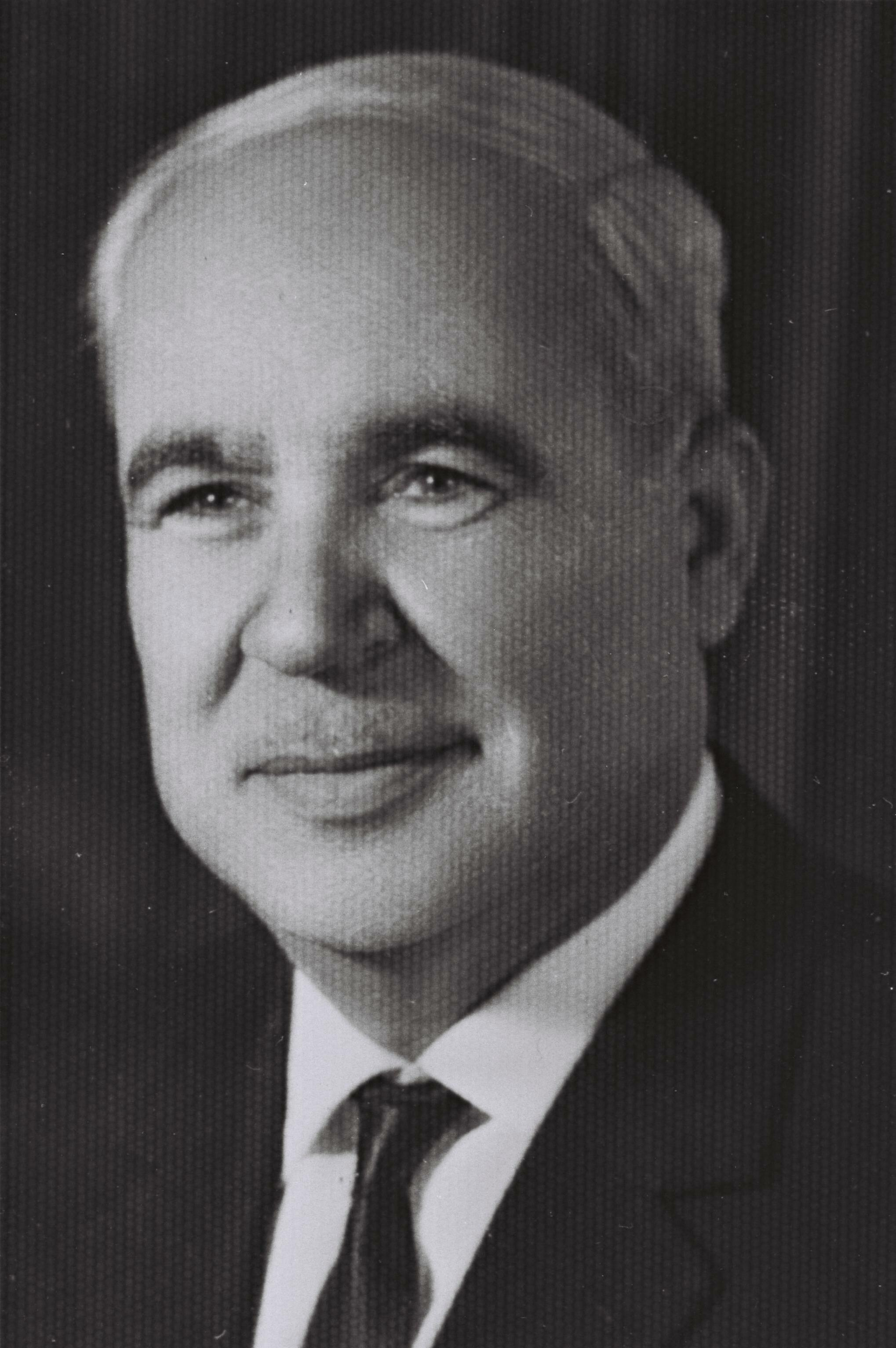
- Obeid in 1969

Faction represented in the Knesset
- 1961–1966: Cooperation and Brotherhood
- 1966–1967: Cooperation and Development
- 1967–1974: Cooperation and Brotherhood

Personal details
- Born: 1911 Tayibe, Ottoman Empire
- Died: 18 February 1984 (aged 72–73)

Diyab Obeid (Arabic: دياب عبيد, Hebrew: דיאב עובייד; 1911 – 18 February 1984) was an Israeli Arab politician who served as a member of the Knesset for Cooperation and Brotherhood and Cooperation and Development between 1961 and 1974.

Born in Tayibe during the Ottoman era, Obeid worked as a merchant in Tulkarm until 1936, when he moved to Jaffa, where he was a member of the local Merchants Council. In 1937 during the Arab revolt in Palestine he moved to Jebchit in southern Lebanon until his return to Palestine in 1944. In 1948 he moved to Tayibe, where he worked in agriculture for three years. In 1951 he was elected to Tayibe local council, which he remained a member of until 1958.

In 1961 he was elected to the Knesset on the Cooperation and Brotherhood list. In February 1962 and February 1963, when the Knesset decided by a majority of one vote on the continuation of the martial law over the Israeli Arabs, Obeid was among those who supported the continuation of the martial law. He was re-elected in 1965 and 1969, during which time the party briefly merged into Cooperation and Development, before losing his seat in the 1973 elections.

In 1974 he was appointed an advisor to the Minister of Agriculture. He died in 1984.
