= Elias Dib =

Lebanese writer and visual artist

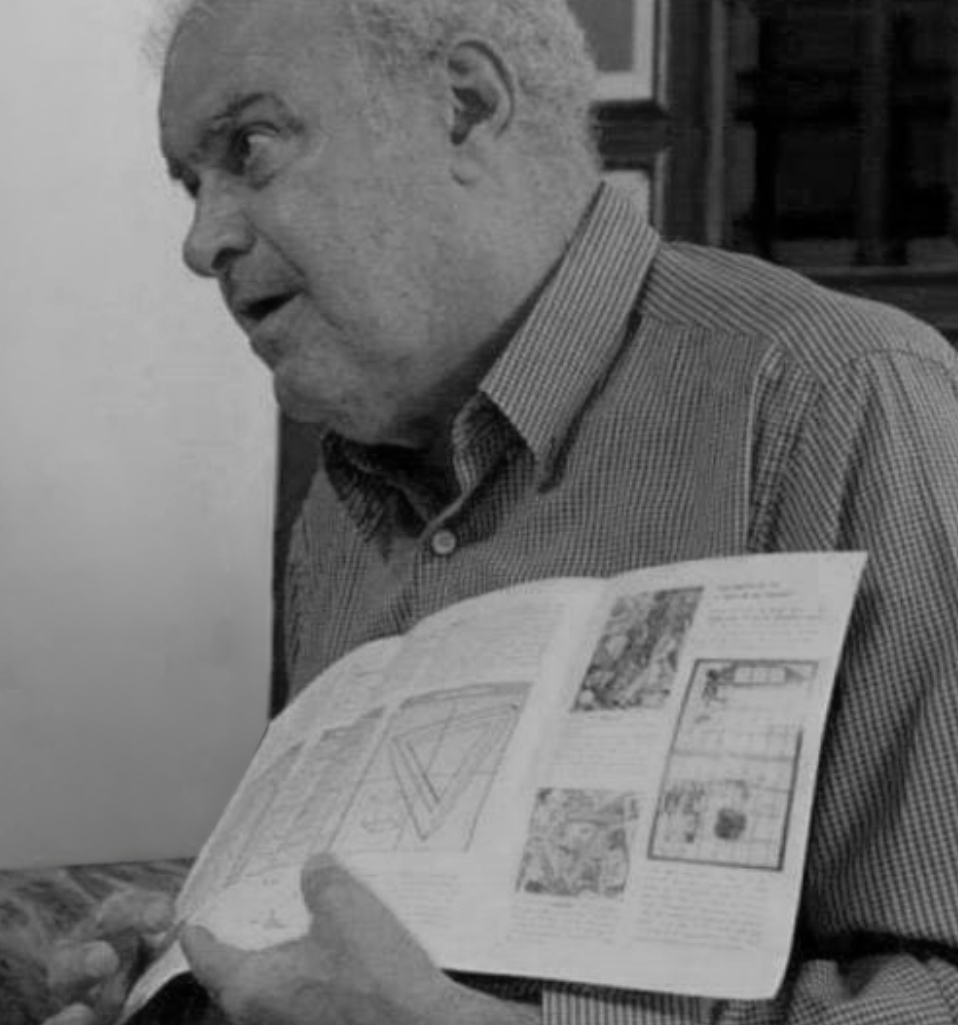
Elias Dib (1945 - 2021)

Born in 1945, Elias Dib (Arabic: إلياس ديب) was a Franco-Lebanese intellectual, writer and visual artist.

== Education ==
Elias Dib received his D.E.A. in plastic arts, and a Doctorate in Sciences of Art, from Université Paris 1 Panthéon-Sorbonne. Thesis entitled "Le visuel paradoxal à l'épreuve du jeu d'échecs".

== Career ==
Elias lived between France and Lebanon. He was an avid force in Lebanon's cultural scene. His significant solo exhibitions were held in Beirut, Paris, and Geneva, and he has participated in numerous group exhibitions in Lebanon and France.

At the Lebanese University, Institute of Fine Arts and Architecture, Dr Dib taught live model, mythology, art history, art criticism, arts and applied theories.

He was the President of the Association of Lebanese Artists for Painting and Sculpture from 2013 till 2015.

== Works ==
Elias Dib is the author of "The Magic Tool: Readings in Gibran's Hand". In which he examines a painting by Gibran Khalil Gibran. The book was published in Arabic and French.

His last book "The Echo Mill" is a collection of poems, and his workshop was severely damaged during the Beirut port blast in 2020.
