= David Rowland (property developer) =

British property developer (born 1945)

David John Rowland
- Born: 16 June 1945 (age 81)
- Occupation: Property developer
- Known for: Conservative Party
- Children: 9 (including Jonathan)

David John Rowland (born 1945) is a British property developer, banker and financier. According to The Sunday Times Rich List in 2019, he is worth £612 million. He is nicknamed 'Spotty'. The Rowland family is an investment adviser to Andrew Mountbatten Windsor.

== Early life ==
David Rowland was born in 1945 to the family of a scrap metal dealer.

== Business activities ==
Rowland established Fordham Investment Group in 1965. In 1970, he sold his stake in Fordham for £2.4 million, and moved to France. In the 1970s, he took control of the shipping company Williams Hudson and the timber group Venesta International through Argo Caribbean Group Limited, a Bahamian company controlled by the trustees of a Rowland's family settlement.

In 1989, Rowland acquired 34% interest in Idaho-based Gulf Resources & Chemical Corporation from the Barclay brothers. A controlling stake was bought through a property company Inoco Plc., which was controlled by a Panama-based company, Monaco Group Fund S.A., an entity which was at that time governed by "trustees of settlements whose beneficiaries are Rowland and his children". Rowland himself became CEO of Gulf Resources. In 1991, Inoco sold its stake to Nycal Corporation. Over the following years, Gulf resorted to the American courts to recover company monies they alleged were spent by David Rowland, firstly via the courts and then via their insurance company. One case was settled (though no financial settlement was deemed necessary), while Gulf lost another.

In 2009, Kaupthing Bank Luxembourg, affected by the global liquidity squeeze, was divided into two new entities, a 'good, healthy' bank, later renamed Banque Havilland, and a 'bad' bank. David Rowland and his son Jonathan, via their investment company Blackfish Capital, acquired and recapitalized the former and now manage the assets, on behalf of the interbank creditors, of the latter.

Redwood Financial Partners, a company controlled by David Rowland and his son Jonathan Rowland, own Redwood Bank, which became operational in 2017. At the same year, David Rowland and his son Edmund Rowland, through their investment company Staunton Holdings Ltd, made a takeover bid for the Falkland Islands-based FIH group. The takeover failed and their stake in the company was sold.

According to the Panama Papers leak, Rowland was a shareholder in "dozens of offshore companies" in the British Virgin Islands. The companies went through the letters of the alphabet; Asherton, Binbrook, Coalburn, Docking, etc.

== Football issues ==
In 1988, Rowland helped fund a lawyer, David Duff, in a failed takeover of Edinburgh Hibernian, parent company of Scottish Premier Division football club Hibernian. Eventually the company went into receivership.

In 2013, Rowland-owned Fordham Sports Management Ltd. acquired Manchester City's top players' image rights.

== Conservative Party ==
In the year before the 2010 United Kingdom general election, Rowland donated £2.8m to the Conservative Party, making him the party's major donor.

Rowland had lived in Guernsey, but returned to full United Kingdom residency in order to make donations to the Conservatives. Electoral law in the United Kingdom prohibits foreign donations to political parties.

In August 2010, Rowland made another donation of £1 million to the Conservative Party. In May 2017, he gave £200,000 to the Conservative Party.

== Personal life ==
Rowland moved from London to Paris at the age of 24, then Monte Carlo, Monaco, and finally Guernsey, where he has lived since at least 2005. He lives at Havilland Hall, the largest privately owned estate on the island, where in 2005, Andrew Mountbatten Windsor unveiled a life-size bronze statue of Rowland smoking a cigar in a "vaguely Churchillian pose".

He has eight children.
