= List of tells =

In archaeology, a tell, or tel (Hebrew: תֵּלArabic: تَل, tall, 'hill' or 'mound'), is an artificial mound formed from the accumulated refuse or deposits of people living on the same site for hundreds or thousands of years. A classic tell looks like a low, truncated cone with sloping sides and can be up to 30 metres high.

Tells are most commonly associated with the archaeology of the ancient Near East, Southeast Europe (Bulgaria and Greece), also reaching Central Asia and West Africa. Within the Near East, they are concentrated in less arid regions, including Upper Mesopotamia, the Southern Levant, Anatolia and Iran.

== Azerbaijan ==
- Nargiztapa
- Govurqala, Nakhchivan
- Uzerliktapa
- Alikemek-Tepesi
- Kültəpə
- Baba-Dervish settlement
- Garakopaktapa
- Nakhchivan Tepe

== Bulgaria ==
- Tell Golemija ostrov (Durankulak lake)
- Tell Ezero
- Tell Karanovo
- Tell Solnitsata
- Tell Yunatsite

== Egypt ==
- Amarna
- Athribis
- Avaris
- Bubastis
- Buto
- Heliopolis (ancient Egypt)
- Kom Firin
- Leontopolis
- Mendes
- Pithom
- Tell El Kebir
- Tell el-Balamun
- Tell el-Qudeirat
- Tell Nebesha
- Thmuis

== Gaza Strip ==
A study of architectural heritage sites in the Gaza Strip conducted by Heritage for Peace identified 39 "archaeological hills".

- Tell Ali Muntar
- Tell el-Ajjul
- Tell Umm el-'Amr
- Tell Ruqeish
- Tell es-Sakan
- Tell es-Sanam

== Iran ==
- Ali Kosh
- Chogha Bonut
- Chogha Golan
- Chogha Mish
- Ecbatana
- Fire Temple of Bahram
- Ganj Dareh
- Ganj Par
- Godin Tepe
- Haft Tepe
- Hajji Firuz Tepe
- Kuzaran
- Marlik
- Noushijan
- Rahmatabad Mound
- Salaleh
- Shahr-e Sukhteh
- Tall-i Bakun
- Tepe Hissar
- Tepe Sialk
- Tepe Yahya
- Teppe Hasanlu
- Teppe Zagheh

== Iraq ==
- Adab (city)
- Abu Salabikh
- Bakr Awa
- Citadel of Erbil
- Dur-Kurigalzu
- Gird-î Qalrakh
- Jemdet Nasr
- Mane (ancient city)
- Nineveh
- Rapiqum
- Tel Abib
- Tel Keppe
- Tell Agrab
- Tell al-Fakhar
- Tell al-Rimah
- Tell al-'Ubaid
- Tell Arpachiyah
- Tell Bazmusian
- Tell Begum
- Tell el-'Oueili
- Tell es-Sawwan
- Tell Hassuna
- Tell Ishchali
- Tell Khaiber
- Tell Maghzaliyah
- Tell Shemshara
- Tell Taya
- Tell Uqair
- Telul eth-Thalathat
- Tepe Gawra
- Yarim Tepe
- Qara Tapa
- Nuzi
- Lubdu
- Naysan

== Israel ==
- Abel-beth-maachah
- Achziv
- Adullam
- Antipatris
- Ashdod
- Ashkelon National Park
- Azekah
- Beit She'an
- Beit Shemesh
- Dan (ancient city)
- Ein Gedi
- Ekron
- Gath (city)
- Gezer
- Gibeah
- Hurvat Itri
- Jezreel (city)
- Kedesh
- Khirbet et-Tibbaneh
- Khirbet Kerak
- Kinneret (archaeological site)
- Masil al-Jizl
- Rebbo
- Sokho
- Tel Arad
- Tel Be'er Sheva
- Tel Dor
- Tel Hazor
- Tel Kabri
- Tel Lachish
- Tel Megiddo
- Tel Qana
- Tel Rehov
- Tel Shikmona
- Tel Yokneam
- Tell Beit Mirsim
- Tell el-Hesi
- Tell es-Safi
- Tell Keisan
- Tell Qasile
- Yavne
- Yavne-Yam

== Jordan ==
- Amman Citadel
- Tall Jawa
- Tall Zira'a
- Tell Abu al-Kharaz
- Tell el-Fukhar (Jordan)
- Tell Hammeh
- Tell Johfiyeh
- Tell Mar Elias

== Lebanon ==
- Ancient Tell
- Sarepta
- Tell Aalaq
- Tell Ablah
- Tell Addus
- Tell Ahle
- Tell Ain Cerif
- Tell Ain el Meten
- Tell Ain Ghessali
- Tell Ain Nfaikh
- Tell Ain Saouda
- Tell Ain Sofar
- Tell Ayoub
- Tell Bar Elias
- Tell Beshara
- Tell Bir Dakoue
- Tell Deir
- Tell Delhamieh
- Tell Derzenoun
- Tell Dibbine
- Tell el-Burak
- Tell El Ghassil
- Tell El Hadeth
- Tell Fadous
- Tell Hazzine
- Tell Hoch Rafqa
- Tell Jisr
- Tell Karmita
- Tell Khardane
- Tell Kirri
- Tell Jezireh
- Tell Kabb Elias
- Tell Majdaloun
- Tell Masoud
- Tell Mekhada
- Tell Meouchi
- Tell Mureibit
- Tell Murtafa
- Tell Nahariyah
- Tell Neba'a Chaate
- Tell Neba'a Litani
- Tell Qasr Labwe
- Tell Rasm El Hadeth
- Tell Rayak
- Tell Saatiya
- Tell Safiyeh
- Tell Saoudhi
- Tell Serhan
- Tell Shaikh Hassan al Rai
- Tell Shamsine
- Tell Sultan Yakoub
- Tell Taalabaya
- Tell Wardeen
- Tell Zenoub
- Tell Zeitoun

== Syria ==
- Al-Rawda (tell)
- Baliḫu
- Citadel of Aleppo
- Ebla
- Gamla
- Homs
- Mari, Syria
- Mureybet
- Qatna
- Tell Abu Hureyra
- Tell Afis
- Tell al-'Abr
- Tell al-Mishrifeh (Qatna)
- Tell al-Salihiyah
- Tell Aqab
- Tell Arbid
- Tell Ashtara
- Tell Banat
- Tell Barri
- Tell Beydar
- Tell Brak
- Tell Chuera
- Tell Danith
- Tell eth-Thadeyn
- Tell Ezou
- Tell Fekheriye
- Tell Fray
- Tell Ghoraifé
- Tell Hadar
- Tell Halaf
- Tell Halula
- Tell Kashfahan
- Tell Kazel
- Tell Khazzami
- Tell Leilan
- Tell Marj
- Tell Mashnaqa
- Tell Qaramel
- Tell Qarassa
- Tell Qarqur
- Tell Ramad
- Tell Sabi Abyad
- Tell Sukas
- Tell Taban
- Tel Tamer
- Tell Tuneinir
- Tell Tweini
- Tell Zeidan
- Urkesh
- Zahiran

== Turkey ==
- Alalakh
- Göbekli Tepe
- Gürcütepe
- Çatalhöyük
- Hisarlik (Troy)
- Kültepe
- Sultantepe
- Tell Judaidah
- Tell Tayinat

== United Arab Emirates ==
- Tell Abraq

== West Bank ==
- Et-Tell
- Jericho
- Khirbet Tibnah
- Shiloh (biblical city)
- Tell Balata
- Tell en-Nasbeh
- Tell es-Sultan

== See also ==
- Tell (archaeology)
- List of tells in Lebanon
- The archaeological hills in Erbil
