= List of archaeological sites in Lebanon =

This is a list of archaeological sites in the Republic of Lebanon.

There are many tells in Lebanon – artificial mounds formed from the accumulated refuse of people living on the same site for hundreds or thousands of years. A classic tell looks like a low, truncated cone with sloping sides and can be up to 30 metres high. Tells are most commonly associated with the archaeology of the ancient Near East, but they are also found elsewhere, such as Central Asia, Eastern Europe, West Africa and Greece. Within the Near East, they are concentrated in less arid regions, including Upper Mesopotamia, the Southern Levant, Anatolia and Iran.

== Tells ==
This is a list of notable archaeological tells in Lebanon sorted by alphabetical order:

- Tell Aalaq
- Tell Ablah
- Tell Addus
- Tell Ahle
- Tell Ain Cerif
- Tell Ain el Meten
- Tell Ain Ghessali
- Tell Ain Nfaikh
- Tell Ain Saouda
- Tell Ain Sofar
- Tell Ayoub
- Tell Bar Elias
- Tell Beshara
- Tell Bir Dakoue
- Tell Deir
- Tell Delhamieh
- Tell Derzenoun
- Tell Dibbine
- Tell el-Burak
- Tell El Ghassil
- Tell El Hadeth
- Tell Fadous
- Tell Hazzine
- Tell Hoch Rafqa
- Tell Karmita
- Tell Khardane
- Tell Kirri
- Tell Jezireh
- Tell Jisr
- Tell Kabb Elias
- Tell Majdaloun
- Tell Masoud
- Tell Mekhada
- Tell Meouchi
- Tell Mureibit
- Tell Murtafa
- Tell Nahariyah
- Tell Neba'a Chaate
- Tell Neba'a Litani
- Tell Nhas
- Tell Qasr Labwe
- Tell Rasm El Hadeth
- Tell Rayak
- Tell Saatiya
- Tell Safiyeh
- Tell Saoudhi
- Tell Serhan
- Tell Shaikh Hassan al Rai
- Tell Shamsine
- Tell Sultan Yakoub
- Tell Taalabaya
- Tell Wardeen
- Tell Zenoub
- Tell Zeitoun

== Hellenistic and Roman sites ==
- Aaqbe temple
- Arca Caesarea (Arqa)
- Bakka Roman temple
- Berytus (Beirut)

- Cardo Decumanus Crossing
- Cisterns of the Roman Baths, Beirut
- Colonnaded Street
- Hippodrome of Berytus
- Roman Baths, Beirut
- Roman Forum, Beirut

- Dakoue Roman temple
- Al-Hebbariyah Roman temple
- Heliopolis (Baalbek)

- Temple of Bacchus
- Temple of Jupiter

- Jeb Jennine Roman bridge
- Labweh Roman temple
- Leontes Bridge
- Libbaya Roman temple
- Nebi Safa
- Niha
- Qalaat Faqra
- Qasr el Banat
- Saraain El Faouqa
- Sidon (Colonia Aurelia Pia)
- Tripolis
- Tyre

- Tyre Hippodrome
- Tyre Necropolis

- Umm al-Amad
- Yammoune Roman temple
