= Lorraine Copeland =

British archaeologist (1921–2013)

- Born: Elizabeth Lorraine Adie; May 19, 1921; Marylebone, London, England
- Died: 27 April 2013 (aged 91); Dordogne, France
- Relatives: Miles Copeland Jr. (husband); Miles Copeland III (son); Ian Copeland (son); Lorraine Copeland (daughter); Stewart Copeland (son)
- Military career
- Allegiance: United Kingdom
- Branch: Special Operations Executive; Office of Strategic Services
- Service years: 1940–1942
- Rank: Field agent
- Awards: MBE
- Other work: Archaeology

Lorraine Copeland (née Elizabeth Lorraine Adie; 19 May 1921 – 27 April 2013) was a British archaeologist specialising in the Palaeolithic period of the Near East. She was a secret agent with the Special Operations Executive during the Second World War.

== Early life ==
Elizabeth Lorraine Adie was born May 19, 1921, in Marylebone, London. Her father, William John Adie (1886–1935), an Australian-born British physician and neurologist known for describing the Adie syndrome and narcolepsy. He practiced medicine in London on Harley Street. Elizabeth Lorraine Adie was privately educated at Wycombe Abbey girls' school in High Wycombe, Buckinghamshire.

== Special operations executive ==
Copeland worked for British Intelligence during the Second World War, in the Special Operations Executive. She met her American husband, Miles Copeland Jr., during this period, when he was based in the UK undertaking counter-intelligence for the US Army Counter Intelligence Corps. They married on 25 September 1942 and soon afterwards Miles' work took them to the Near East, particularly Syria, Lebanon and Egypt, and it was whilst in this area that Copeland first developed her interest in archaeology. They held a church wedding September 25, 1943, at Holy Trinity Church, near Harley Street, London.

== Archaeology ==
Copeland worked in the field of Palaeolithic and Neolithic archaeology for over fifty years, and was associated with the University College London Institute of Archaeology. Accompanied by Peter J. Wescombe she co-compiled three volumes titled "Inventory of Stone-Age Sites in Lebanon". Volume 1 (1965) covered the central portion of the western coast from Tripoli to the North bank of the Litani River. Volume 2 (1966) provided an inventory of Stone Age sites in Southern Lebanon and the Beqaa Valley, expanding on the discovery of the Heavy Neolithic Qaraoun culture, named by Henri Fleisch. Volume 3 was published in 1997. She was an adviser to the Stone Age Institute. In 2004 the festschrift, From the River to the Sea: The Palaeolithic and the Neolithic on the Euphrates and in the Northern Levant, was published in her honour.

=== Archaeological sites investigated by Copeland ===
==== Lebanon ====
- Akkar plain foothills
- Antelias Cave
- Haret ech Cheikh
- Jebel Aabeby
- Jeita Grotto § Archaeology (Jeita II – Dahr el-Mghara)
- Mayrouba

Mayrouba § Mayrouba I
Mayrouba § Mayrouba IV
Mayrouba § Mayrouba VI

- Ourrouar
- Plain of Zgharta
- Sin el Fil § Prehistory and Roman period
- Ras Beirut § Archaeology (Ras Beirut XI or Minet ed Dhalia)
- Sands of Beirut
- Tell Kirri
- Tibnin § Prehistory
- Wadi Yaroun
South Lebanon
- Aadloun § Materials recovered (Aadloun IV)
- Ard Saouda
- Tell Dibbine
Beqaa Valley (Lebanon)
- Aammiq § Archaeology
- Al-Bireh, Rashaya § Archaeology
- Ard Tlaili ★
- Bustan Birke ★
- Duris
- Flaoui ★
- Haouch Tall Safiyeh
- Hashbai ★
- Joub Jannine § Archaeological sites (Joub Jannine II)
- Kamouh el Hermel § Shepherd Neolithic archaeological site ★
- Labweh § Archaeological sites (Tell Labweh, Tell Labweh South or Labweh I)
- Majdal Anjar § Archaeology
- Maqne
- Neba'a Faour ★
- Qaraoun

Qaraoun § Qaraoun I (Left Bank)
Qaraoun § Qaraoun II (Right Bank)
Qaraoun § Qaraoun III (Ain el Barde)

- Rayaq § Archaeology
- Ras Baalbek (Rock Shelter) ★
- Tahun ben Aissa ★
- Tell Aalaq
- Tell Ablah
- Tell Addus
- Tell Ahle
- Tell Ain Cerif
- Tell Ain Ghessali
- Tell Ain Nfaikh ★
- Tell Ain Sofar
- Tell Ayoub
- Tell Bar Elias
- Tell Beshara
- Tell Bir Dakoue
- Tell Deir
- Tell Delhamieh
- Tell Derzenoun
- Tell El Ghassil
- Tell El Hadeth
- Tell Hazzine
- Tell Hoch Rafqa
- Tell Jezireh
- Tell Jisr ★
- Tell Kabb Elias
- Tell Karmita
- Tell Majdaloun
- Tell Masoud
- Tell Meouchi
- Tell Murtafa
- Tell Nahariyah
- Tell Neba'a Chaate
- Tell Neba'a Litani
- Tell Rasm El Hadeth
- Tell Rayak
- Tell Saoudhi
- Tell Serhan
- Tell Shaikh Hassan al Rai
- Tell Shamsine
- Tell Zeitoun

==== Syria ====
- El Kowm

––––––––––––––––––––

★ Indicates sites discovered or first recorded by Copeland, sometimes with collaborators.

== Family ==
Copeland married Miles on 25 September 1942 at St Mary's Church, Great Portland Street, London. The couple had four children, all of whom went on to have notable careers:

1. Their eldest son Miles Copeland III (born 2 May 1944) is an executive in the entertainment industry.
2. Ian Copeland (1949–2006) was a music promoter and booking agent.
3. Lorraine "Lennie" Copeland is a writer and film producer.
4. Stewart Copeland (born 16 July 1952) is a musician best known as the drummer for the band The Police.

Her husband Miles died on 14 January 1991. Lorraine Copeland died at Château de Marouatte (Marouatte Castle), Dordogne, France, on 27 April 2013. Lorraine Copeland is buried next to her husband, Miles Axe Copeland, Jr., in the churchyard of St Peter and St Paul's Church (Church of England), Aston Rowant, Oxfordshire.

== Selected publications ==
- See also § Copeland's publications used as references (primary)
- Copeland, Lorraine; Waechter, John d'Arcy (1915–1978) (1967). "The Stone Industries of Abri Bergy, Lebanon". Bulletin of the Institute of Archaeology. 7. University of London, Institute of Archaeology: 15–36 – via Internet Archive. ISSN 0076-0722 (publication); OCLC 2212200 (all editions).

=== Paléorient (journal) ===
- Paléorient (journal). CNRS Editions. LCCN 88-649200; ISSN 0153-9345; ISBN 978-2-2710-8175-9, 2-2710-8175-0; OCLC 2552402 (all editions).
1. Copeland, Lorraine (1978). "The Middle Palaeolithic of Adlun and Ras el Kelb (Lebanon) : First Results From a Study of the Flint Industries". Vol. 4, Nº 4. pp. 33–57 – via Persée. doi:10.3406/paleo.1978.4212; OCLC 732480174, 4649025815.
2. Copeland, Lorraine (1983). "Levallois/Non-Levallois Determinations in the Early Levant Mousterian : Problems and Questions for 1983". Vol. 9, Nº 2. pp. 15–27 – via Persée. Frantiq 214227 and 548193; JSTOR 41489570; OCLC 770926691, 770926691, 732480741.
3. Besançon, Jacques; Copeland, Lorraine; Sanlaville, Paul (1933–2021) (1988). "Réflexions sur les prospections géo-préhistoriques au Proche-Orient" ["Reflections on Geo-Prehistoric Surveys in the Near East"] (in French). Vol. 14, Nº 2. pp. 31–39 – via Persée. doi:10.3406/paleo.1988.4452; Frantiq 300266; OCLC 9973486157, 732481510.

=== British Archaeological Reports (BAR) ===
- BAR International Series. British Archaeological Reports. Oxford. ISSN 0143-3067; OCLC 5883233 (all editions).
- Copeland, Lorraine (1975). "The Middle and Upper Paleolithic of Lebanon and Syria in the Light of Recent Research". In Wendorf, [Denver] Fred (1924–2015); Marks, Anthony Edward ("Tony") (1938–2025) (eds.). Problems in Prehistory: North Africa and the Levant. Dallas: SMU Press. pp. 317–350 – via Google Books (snippet view only). LCCN 74-14722; ISBN 978-0-8707-4146-3, 0-8707-4146-2; OCLC 1009407 (all editions).
- Copeland, Lorraine; Hours, Francis (1921–1987), eds. (1989). The Hammer on the Rock – Studies in the Early Palaeolithic of Azraq, Jordan (2 Vols.). Archaeological Series No. 5 – BAR International Series 540, 540(i), and 540(e). Lyon, France: Maison de l'Orient Méditerranéen (C.N.R.S. – Lumière University Lyon 2). LCCN 90-136991; doi:10.30861/9780860546863 (online ed.); ISBN 978-1-4073-8719-2 (Vol. 1), ISBN 978-1-4073-8720-8 (Vol. 2), ISBN 978-0-8605-4686-3, 0-8605-4686-1 (2-volume set, paperback), ISBN 978-1-4073-4835-3 (Pdf eBook); OCLC 21224302 (all editions).
See Azraq, Jordan
1. Copeland, Lorraine. "The Artifacts from a Sounding of D. Kirkbride at Lion Spring, Azraq in 1956". pp. 171–212. See Diana Kirkbride (1915–1997).
2. Copeland, Lorraine. "The Harding Collection of Acheulean Artifacts from Lion Spring, Azraq: A Quantitative and Descriptive Analysis". pp. 213–258. See Gerald Lankester Harding (1901–1979).
3. Copeland, Lorraine. "Analysis of the Paleolithic Artifacts from a Sounding by A. Garrard at C-Spring, Azraq, 1985 Season". pp. 325–390. See Andrew Garrard.
4. Copeland, Lorraine. "Surface Finds at Northern and South-Eastern Sites". pp. 451–468.
5. Copeland, Lorraine; Hours, Francis (1921–1987). "The Lower and Middle Paleolithic of the Desert Wadis in the Azraq Basin: Survey Results, 1982–1986". pp. 65–152. See Wadi.
- Roe, Derek Arthur (1937–2014), ed. (1983). Adlun in the Stone Age – The Excavations of D.A.E. Garrod in the Lebanon, 1958–1963. BAR International Series 159. doi:10.30861/9780860542032; ISBN 978-1-4073-9095-6 (Vol. 1), ISBN 978-1-4073-9096-3 (Vol. 2), ISBN 978-0-8605-4203-2, 0-8605-4203-3 (2-volume set; paperback); ISBN 978-1-4073-3064-8 (eBook); OCLC 12510805 (all editions). See Dorothy Annie Elizabeth Garrod (1892–1968).

Pᴀʀᴛ I. BAR International Series 159(i). pp. 1–258.
- Part I.
- Contents. p. v.
- Saint-Mathurin, Suzanne de (1900–1991) [in French]. Preface. p. xi.
- Abstract. p. xvii.
- Resume [Dorothy Annie Elizabeth Garrod (1892–1968)]. p. xxi.
- Chapter 1: Copeland, Lorraine. "The Region of Adlun". p. 1.
- Chapter 2: Sweeting, Marjorie Mary (1920–1994). "The Geological and Morphological Setting". p. 11.
- Chapter 3: Section I: Kirkbride, Diana (1915–1997). "The Soundings at the Mugharet El-Bezez". p. 23. ("A sounding is a test dig in archaeology. Mugharet El-Bezez is a Paleolithic cave site located in Adlun, Lebanon).

- Appendix A: Cornwall, Ian Wolfran (1909–1994). "Notes on Some Soil Samples from Bezez Cave". p. 69.

- Section II: Copeland, Lorraine. "Abri Zumoffen, 1958, in Retrospect and the Extension, 1963".

- Chapter 4: "The Stone Industries".

- Section I: "The Acheuleo-Yabrudian of Bezez Cave, Level C".

- Appendix A: "The 'Tayacian Flakes'". p. 195.
- Appendix B: "The Breccia Blocks". p. 206.

- Section II: "The Amudian Beach Industry at Abri Zumoffen". p. 209. See Aadloun § Aadloun I.

Pᴀʀᴛ II. BAR International Series 159(ii). pp. 261–455.
- Part II.
- Chapter 4 (continued).

- Section III: "The Levalloiso-Mousterian of Bezez Cave, Level B". p. 261.

- Appendix C: "Description of Levalloiso-Mousterian Material Inside Bezez Cave Not Included in the Above Analyses". p. 325.
- Appendix D: "Inventory of D/G.44 and G.44 Artifacts, Before Amalgamation". p. 329.

- Section IV: "The Aurignacian of Bezez Cave, Level A". p. 331.

- Appendix E: "Level A Burin Types". p. 335.

- Chapter 5: Kirkbride, Diana (1915–1997). "The Neolithic of Bezez Cave". p. 367.
- Chapter 6: Skinner, J. H. "The Breccias of the Adlun Promontory". pp. 391–395. See Adlun.
- Chapter 7: Garrard, Andrew N. "The Palaeolithic Faunal Remains from Adlun and Their Ecological Context". p. 397.

- Appendix A: "The Molluscan Fauna of the Strombus Beach at Naame". Compiled by Lorraine Copeland from work by Pierre Elouard (1925–2018). p. 411.
- Appendix B: "A Pollen Spectrum from the Yabrudian of Abri Zumoffen". Prepared from notes submitted by Arlette Leroi-Gourhan (1913–2005). p. 413.

- Chapter 8: Kirkbride, Diana (1915–1997); De Saint-Mathurin, Suzanne Cassou (1900–1991) [in French]; Copeland, Lorraine. "Results, Tentative Interpretations and Suggested Chronology". p. 415.
- Editor's Postscript: Roe, Derek Arthur (1937–2014). "Adlun as a Palaeolithic Site". p. 433.
- General Bibliography. p. 443.

- Sanlaville, Paul (1933–2021); Besançon, Jacques; Copeland, Lorraine; Muhesen, Sultan, eds. (1993). Le Paléolithique de la vallée moyenne de l'Oronte (Syrie) : peuplement et environnement [The Paleolithic of the Middle Orontes Valley (Syria): Human Occupation and Environment ]. BAR International Series 587 (in French). Lyon, France: Maison de l'Orient Méditerranéen. doi:10.30861/9780860547471 (online); ISBN 978-0-8605-4747-1, 0-8605-4747-7 (paperback), ISBN 978-1-4073-4887-2, 1-4073-4887-6 (eBook); OCLC 30516267 (all editions).
- Copeland, Lorraine; Moloney, Norah (1945–2018), eds. (1998). The Mousterian Site of Ras el-Kelb, Lebanon. BAR International Series 706. Oxford: J. & E. Hedges Ltd. LCCN 98-162186; doi:10.30861/9780860549390; ISBN 978-0-8605-4939-0, 0-8605-4939-9 (paperback), ISBN 978-1-4073-5021-9, 1-4073-5021-8 (eBook); OCLC 39657785 (all editions). See Mousterian and Ras el Kelb.

== Bibliography ==
=== Secondary references ===
- AND Magazine. Gina Faddis, ed., Davidsonville, Maryland. Charles Sam Faddis, publisher.
1. Stein, Jeff (30 April 2013). "Famed CIA Widow Dies – Lorraine Copeland Was a Daring WW-2 Operative Herself" (editorial ID: 12923). Archived from the original on 3 May 2013.
- Edinburgh News; Scotsman (The) (19 April 2017). "5 Scots Spies to Mark Edinburgh Spy Week". OCLC 55942686 (all editions) (Edinburgh News); OCLC 3856993 (all editions); ISSN 0307-5850 (Scotsman); LCCN 2013-225009 (Scotsman); OCLC 868238067 (all editions) (Scotsman).
1. Via Edinburgh News blog. Archived from the original on 15 October 2023.
2. Via Scotsman blog. Archived from the original on 15 October 2023.
- ⦿ Lorraine Copeland.
- ⦿ Allan Pinkerton (1819–1884).
- ⦿ Alasdair Ruadh MacDonnell (c. 1725–1761).
- ⦿ William Forbes-Sempill, 19th Lord Sempill (1893–1965).
- ⦿ Sir Compton Mackenzie (1883–1972).
Edinburgh Spy Week is an annual event series launched April 6–12, 2014, exploring real and fictional espionage. The founding and current organizers are the University of Edinburgh, the Institute for Advanced Studies in the Humanities, the National Library of Scotland, the Edinburgh Filmhouse, and Blackwell's Bookshop.
- Garrard, Andrew N.; Aurenche, Olivier; Sanlaville, Paul (1933–2021) (January 2014). "In Memorandum: Lorraine Copeland (1921–2013)". Paléorient (biannual journal). 40 (1). Paris: CNRS Éditions: 5–8. Frantiq 626306 (article); LCCN 88-649200 (journal); ISBN 978-2-2710-8175-9, 2-2710-8175-0 (journal); JSTOR 24672265 (article); ISSN 0153-9345 (journal); OCLC 2552402 (all editions) (journal); OCLC 890028068, 9973217225 (article).
1. Via Persée. See: Persée.
- Neo-Lithics. A Newsletter of Southwest Asian Lithics Research. Ahrensfelde-Lindenberg, Germany: ex oriente, e.V., at Free University of Berlin, c/o ex oriente Research Station and Publishers. (Ex Oriente is a Latin phrase meaning "from the East"). ISSN 1434-6990; OCLC 1029863560 (all editions).
1. "Report on the Second Workshop on PPN Chipped Lithic Industries, Held in Warsaw, 3rd–7th of April, 1995" (PDF). June 1995.

=== Tertiary references ===
- Civil Registration Indexes (England and Wales). London: General Register Office, Controller of HMSO and the Office for National Statistics – via FreeBMD (BMD = Births, Marriages and Deaths), part of Free UK Genealogy.
1. General Index – Marriages Registered in England and Wales in the Months of July, August and September, 1943. "A–F" (Microfilm Roll: Engl. 001AP, Roll 438). England & Wales, Civil Registration Marriage Index, 1916–2005.
  1. "Copeland, Miles A." ... "Adie" (District: Marylebone. Inferred County: Middlesex. Vol. 1a, p. 1071). p. 214.
  2. "Adie, Lorraine E." ... "Copeland" (District: Marylebone. Inferred County: Middlesex. Vol. 1a, p. 1071). p. 5.
2. General Index – Births Registered in England and Wales in the Months of October, November and December, 1921. "A–F" (Microfilm Roll: Engl. 001AP, Roll 61).
  1. "Adie, Elizabeth L." (District: Marylebone. Inferred County: Middlesex. Vol. 1a, p. 706). p. 9.
Source. Gravestone Photographic Resource.
1. "Miles Axe Copland, Jr" (GPR ID: 235821).
- Spartacus Educational; Simkin, John (September 1997) [updated January 2020]. "British History" – "Spies and Spymasters" – "Miles Copeland [Jr.]". (spartacus-educational.com); OCLC 67863480 (all editions), 973935301.

=== Primary references ===
- Aurenche, Olivier; Le Mière, Marie; Sanlaville, Paul (1933–2021), eds. (2004). From the River to the Sea: The Palaeolithic and the Neolithic on the Euphrates and in the Northern Levant (Maison de l'Orient et de la Méditerranée, a research body dedicated to its founder, Jean Pouilloux). Festschrift → Honouree: Lorraine Copeland (Studies in Honour of Lorraine Copeland). Series: BAR International Series. BAR No: S1263. Oxford, England: Archaeopress. LCCN 2004-445011; ISBN 978-1-8417-1621-3, 1-8417-1621-9 (print ed.), ISBN 978-1-4073-2681-8, 1-4073-2681-3 (pdf eBook); doi:10.30861/9781841716213 (online ed.); OCLC 56344277 (all editions).
1. Snippet view via Google Books (limited preview only).

17 Articles: 10 in French, 7 English.
- Copeland, Lorraine. "The Paleolithic of the Euphrates Valley in Syria". See Euphrates. pp. 19–114.
- Sanlaville, Paul (1933–2021). "Les terrasses pléistocènes de la vallée de l'Euphrate en Syrie et dans l'extrême sud de la Turquie" ["The Pleistocene Terraces of the Euphrates Valley in Syria and Far Southern Turkey"] (in French). pp. 115–133.
- Muhesen, Sultan. "Remarques sur le Paléolithique de la Syrie" ["Observations on the Paleolithic of Syria"] (in French). pp. 135–144. Frantiq 555831; Zenon 001590928.
- Garrard, Andrew J.; McNabb, John; Conolly, James; Moloney, Norah. "Palaeolithic-Neolithic Survey in the Sakçagözü Region of the North Levantine Rift Valley". See Sakçagözü. Note: The North Levantine Rift Valley is the northern extension of the Great Rift Valley system, extending from Syria/Turkey through the Beqaa Valley in Lebanon. pp. 145–164. Frantiq 550392; Zenon 001590929.
- Boëda, Éric [in French]; Courty-Fedoroff, Marie-Agnès (born 1956); Fedoroff, Nicolas (1934–2013) [at Wikidata]; Griggo, Christophe; Muhesen, Sultan; Hedley, Ian. "Le site acheuléen d'El Meirah, Syrie" ["The Acheulean Site of El Meirah, Syria"]. Note: El Meirah is an Acheulean archaeological site (a prehistoric site where Acheulean tools have been found) in the El Kowm Basin of central Syria (in French). pp. 165–201. Frantiq 546651; Zenon 001590930.
- Yazbeck, Corine. "Identification de schémas de débitage au Paléolithique inférieur en Béqaa méridionale (Liban)" ["Identification of Lithic Reduction Patterns in the Lower Paleolithic of Southern Beqaa (Lebanon)"]. See Beqaa Valley (in French). pp. 203–221. Frantiq 561414; Zenon 001590931.
- Le Tensorer, Jean-Marie [in French]. "Nouvelles fouilles à Hummal (El Kowm, Syrie centrale) premiers résultats (1997–2001)" ["New Excavations at Hummal (El Kowm, Central Syria): First Results (1997–2001)"]. See Hummal or El Kowm (in French). pp. 223–239. Frantiq 553920; Zenon 001590932.
- Akazawa, Takeru (born 1938) [at Wikidata]; Muhesen, Sultan; Dodo, Yukio; Kondo, Osamu; Yoneda, Minoru; Griggo, Christophe; Ishida, Hajime. "Neanderthal Burials: Excavations of the Dederiyeh Cave, Syria". See Dederiyeh Cave. pp. 241–270. Zenon 001590934.
- Melki, Élie. "Jiita II: la cabane kébarienne" ["Jiita II: The Kebaran Hut"] (in French). pp. 271–280. Zenon 001590939.
- Akkermans, Peter Mattheus Maria Gerardus (born 1957). "Hunter-Gatherer Continuity: The Transition From the Epipalaeolithic to the Neolithic in Syria". pp. 281–293. Frantiq 544593; Zenon 001590959.
- Coqueugniot, Éric. "Les industries lithiques du Néolithique ancien entre Moyen Euphrate et Jezireh orientale. Réflexions sur deux voies évolutives" ["The Lithic Industries of the Early Neolithic Between the Middle Euphrates and the Eastern Jezireh: Reflections on Two Developmental Trajectories"]. See Tell Jezireh (in French). pp. 295–308. Frantiq 548261; Zenon 001590978.
- Stordeur, Danielle. "'Small Finds and Poor Babies', Quelques Objets 'Divers' du Mureybetien de Jerf El Ahmar" ["'Small Finds and Poor Babies': A Few 'Miscellaneous' Objects from the Mureybetian of Jerf el Ahmar"]. See Mureybetian and Jerf el Ahmar. pp. 309–322. Frantiq 559576; Zenon 001590994.
- Cauvin, Marie-Claire. "Mureybet IV". (Mureybet IV represents the final phase c. 8500–8000 BCE of the Neolithic site of Mureybet in Syria). pp. 323–334. Frantiq 547610; Zenon 001591005.
- Hole, Frank (born 1931). "K-260: Selective Use of Lithic Sources in the PPN/PN of the Khabur Basin, Syria". K–260 (Gharrah) = Neolithic site in the Khabur Basin, the 'K' ID being a numbering system. PPN = Pre-Pottery Neolithic; PN = Pottery Neolithic; See Khabur. pp. 335–353. Frantiq 552166; Zenon 001591007.
- Aurenche, Olivier; Le Mière, Marie; Kozłowski, Stefan Karol (1938–2022). "La notion de frontière dans le Protonéolithique et le Néolithique du Proche-Orient" ["The Concept of Frontier in the Protoneolithic and Neolithic of the Near East"]. See Neolithic in the Near East. For "Protoneolithic", compare Epipalaeolithic Near East and, in the Levantine context, Natufian culture. For the transition to the earliest Neolithic, see also Khiamian culture and Pre-Pottery Neolithic A (in French). pp. 355–366. Frantiq 545280; Zenon 001591087.
- Verhoeven, Marc. "A Tale of Two Tells. Comparing Neolithic Lifestyles at Tell Sabi Abyad II and Tell Sabi Abyad I, Northern Syria". See Tell (definition) and Tell Sabi Abyad. pp. 367–382. Zenon 001591088.
- Nishiaki, Yoshihiro. "Sickle Manufacturing Technologies at Two Chalcolithic Sites in Northern Mesopotamia: Tell Kosak Shamali (Syria) and Telul eth-Thalathat II (Iraq)". See Chalcolithic, Chalcolithic, Northern Mesopotamia, and Telul eth-Thalathat. pp. 383–394. Frantiq 556184; Zenon 001591097.

- Birmingham News (The). Birmingham, Alabama. LCCN sn83-16047; ISSN 0899-0050; OCLC 2665772 (all editions).
1. "Dr., Mrs. Copeland Informed of Son's Wedding in London – Miles A. Copeland Jr. Marries Miss Adie in Church Ceremony" (married September 25, 1943, at Holy Trinity Church, [near] Harley Street, London). Vol. 32, no. 6 (Home ed.). 17 October 1943. p. 1 (Social Section) (digital image 31).
  1. Via Newspapers.com.
- Copeland, Miles Axe III (born 1944) (1989). The Game Player: Confessions of the CIA's Original Political Operative. London: Aurum Press. LCCN 90-115357; ISBN 978-0-9481-4987-0, 0-9481-4987-6.
1. Vol. 1: Via Google Books (NYPL).
2. Via Internet Archive (Cal Berkeley).
- Copeland, Miles [Axe III]. Biography Miles A[xe] Copeland III (primary source). The Copeland Chronicles.
1. Via WaybackMachine (Archived October 12, 2011). Archived from the original on 12 October 2011.
2. Via. University of Montana, faculty & staff blog: "Miles Copeland III" (instructor).
- Stone Age Institute. "Officers and Advisory Board". (stoneageinstitute.org).
1. In 2013. Archived from the original on 11 November 2013.
2. Current.
- "Wycombe Abbey" (official website; primary source). Wycombe Abbey.

==== Copeland's publications used as references (primary) ====
- Mélanges de l'Université Saint-Joseph. "Inventory of Stone-Age Sites in Lebanon". Beirut, Lebanon: Saint Joseph University. LCCN 90-648482; ISSN 0253-164X, ISSN 2662-8295; OCLC 11986781 (all editions).
1. Copeland, Lorraine (née Elisabeth Lorraine Adie; 1921–2013); Wescombe, Peter John (1932–2014) (1965). Part 1: "West-Central Lebanon". Vol. 41, no. 2. pp. 29–176. doi:10.3406/mefao.1965.1155.
2. Copeland, Lorraine; Wescombe, Peter John (1966). Part 2: "North, South and East-Central Lebanon". Vol. 42, no. 1. pp. 1–174. doi:10.3406/mefao.1966.1160.
3. Copeland, Lorraine; Yazbeck, Corine (1997). Part 3: "Additions and Revisions: 1967–2001". Vol. 55 (1997–1998). pp. 121–325.
  1. Via Google Books.
