= Tell Deir =

Archaeological site in Lebanon

- Location within Lebanon
- 33°41′31.9″N 35°47′40.9″E
- Type: Tell
- Cultures: Neolithic
- Location: 7km north of Joub Jannine
- Region: Bekaa Valley

Site notes
- Excavation dates: 1954, 1957
- Archaeologists: A. Kushke, Lorraine Copeland, Peter J. Wescombe
- Condition: Ruins
- Public access: Yes

Tell Deir (Arabic: تل دير, romanized: Tall Dayr) is an archaeological site approximately halfway between Joub Jannine and Chtaura in Lebanon, and a large landmark in the Beqaa Mohafazat (Governorate). It dates at least to the Neolithic.

A large amount of Neolithic material was recovered from the site and it was studied by Lorraine Copeland and Peter Wescombe. The most plentiful types were large axes, adzes, picks, knives and scrapers. Some smaller burins were found along with sickles showing denticulation and segmentation. A few pottery sherds were found with burnishing and red washing. Finds resembled later Neolithic material found nearby and was also suggested to have been occupied in the Bronze Age.
