= Tell Ain Ghessali =

Archaeological site in Lebanon

- Interactive map of Tell Ain Ghessali
- Type: Tell
- Cultures: Neolithic
- Location: 1.5km west of Rayak to Baalbek road near the Talia crossing
- Region: Bekaa Valley

Site notes
- Excavation dates: 1966
- Archaeologists: J. King, Lorraine Copeland, Peter J. Wescombe
- Condition: Ruins
- Public access: Yes

Tell Ain Ghessali is an archaeological site 1.5 km west of Rayak to Baalbek road near the Talia crossing in the Beqaa Mohafazat (Governorate). It dates at least to the Neolithic.
