= Tell Bar Elias =

- Type: Tell
- Cultures: Early Bronze Age
- Location: 2km north of Bar Elias
- Region: Bekaa Valley

Site notes
- Excavation dates: 1933, 1966
- Archaeologists: R. Saidah, A. Kushke, A. Jirku, Lorraine Copeland, Peter J. Wescombe
- Condition: Ruins
- Public access: Yes

Tell Bar Elias is an archaeological site 2 km north of the Chtaura to Damascus road in the centre of the village of Bar Elias in the Beqaa Mohafazat (Governorate). It dates at least to the Early Bronze Age.
