= Canalizations of Zenobia =

Ancient canals to Palmyra in Syria

The Canalizations of Zenobia or El Kanat are canals that according to traditions, were built by Queen Zenobia to channel water from the Orontes River in the Anti-Lebanon mountains to Palmyra. Remains of the ruins of the canals can be seen in places around Lebanon.

== History ==
Some of the canals were built in the second century during Hadrian's time, when the region was fully under Roman rule. There are bridges over canals, still standing from Roman times.

It has been suggested that one of the canals originated from a mountain near Labweh extending to Qusayr. The other extends from the village of Chawaghir, 8 kilometres (5.0 mi) north of Hermel. The canals were cut out of solid limestone bedrock to a depth of 20 metres (66 ft) with wells approximately every 100 metres (330 ft).

Probably Queen Zenobia extended the original canals, in order to bring water to the nearly 200,000 inhabitants of the city and surroundings when she ruled her kingdom.

The canals were used until the Arab conquest, when they were destroyed.

== Data ==
One of the canals is suggested to originate from a mountain near Labweh extending to Qusayr. Labweh has several archaeological sites of interest including three old caves with Roman-Byzantine sarcophagi and the remains of a temple. There are also remains of a Byzantine bastion and a Roman dam suggested to date to the reign of Queen Zenobia. Legend suggests that channels were carved through the rock to send water to her lands in Palmyra, Syria.

Another canal extends from the village of Chawaghir, 8 kilometres (5.0 mi) north of Hermel. The canals - until the outskirts of Palmyra - were cut out of solid limestone bedrock to a depth of 20 metres (66 ft) with wells approximately every 100 metres (330 ft).

Archaeologist Diana Kirkbride wrote:

Among the remains to be found around Hermel one may see the canalizations of Zenobia, queen of Palmyra. Two of them hewn in the rock supplied the city of Palmyra in the desert with water from the Orontes. They were dug at a depth of twenty meters and were connected with wells dug at every hundred meters, channeling the water off to Palmyra, the short-lived capital of Queen Zenobia.

The traditional suggestion that the canals were originally constructed during the brief reign of Zenobia has been treated as probable -but not sure- by Michael Alouf, who notes the existence of canals traces in the desert.
