= Tell Sultan Yakoub =

Archeological site in Lebanon

- Interactive map of Tell Sultan Yakoub
- Type: Tell
- Cultures: Bronze Age
- Location: 2.5km south of Tell Saatiya, 1 km west of Hammara
- Region: Bekaa Valley

Site notes
- Excavation dates: 1966
- Archaeologists: Peter Wescombe
- Condition: Ruins
- Public access: Yes

Tell Sultan Yakoub is an archaeological site 2.5 km south of Tell Saatiya, 1 km west of Hammara in the Beqaa Mohafazat (Governorate) in Lebanon. It dates at least to the Bronze Age.
