= Tell Nahariyah =

- Type: Tell
- Cultures: Neolithic. Bronze Age
- Location: 2.7 km north of Rayak
- Region: Bekaa Valley

Site notes
- Excavation dates: 1963
- Archaeologists: Diana Kirkbride, Maurice Dunand, Lorraine Copeland, James Mellaart
- Condition: Ruins
- Public access: Yes

Tell Nahariyah (Arabic: تل نهاريا) is an archaeological site in the Beqaa Mohafazat (Governorate) in Lebanon. It is located c. 2.7 miles (4.3 km) south of Rayak situated on the left bank of the Litani River. It was discovered in 1963 by Diana Kirkbride who examined recovered material with Maurice Dunand. Neolithic, Chalcolithic and Bronze Age materials were found and discussed by James Mellaart and Lorraine Copeland. The area is now under cultivation.
