= Basil Kazan =

Lebanese composer of sacred music

Basil Gibran Kazan
- Born: May 16, 1915; Jdita-Chtaura (Beqaa Governorate), Lebanon
- Died: November 11, 2001 (aged 86); Brooklyn, NY
- Years active: 1967–1995
- Known for: The Byzantine Music Project
- Spouse(s): Viola Kazan, née Habib

Basil Gibran Kazan (May 16, 1915 – November 11, 2001) was a Lebanese composer of sacred music in the Antiochian Orthodox Christian Archdiocese of North America, and author of the multi-volume Byzantine Project from 1967 to his death in 2001.

== Life ==
=== Early pastoral life ===
Basil was born on May 16, 1915, in Jdita-Chtaura, in the Beqaa Governorate of Lebanon to his father, Economos Girgeos Kazan and mother, Tamam (Shehadey) Kazan. In 1935, Basil received his Bachelor of Arts degree from the Patriarchal School in Damascus, Syria. From 1939 to 1943, Kazan was a professor at the Melkite Catholic seminary of Mar Yohanna in Khenchara, Lebanon. Then he was a professor at the Melkite Basilian Oriental College, in Zahle, Lebanon from 1943 to 1945. In the mid-1940s, Kazan moved to Beirut and served as a professor at the American University of Beirut from 1945 to 1947. After the end of the war, Basil served as the Secretary to Patriarch Alexander III of Antioch from 1947 to 1950. From there, Kazan moved to Athens, where he served as a priest (and later became an archimandrite), and a theological student at the University of Athens from 1950 to 1956. He graduated from the University of Athens in 1956, receiving a Diploma in Theology.

=== First Journey to America, 1957–1967 ===
In 1957, Basil Kazan moved to the United States of America. This was during the episcopacy of Metropolitan Anthony Bashir, who served as Archbishop of the North American archdiocese for the Church of Antioch from 1936 until his death in 1966. In America, he served as pastor of several parishes, including St. Michael Orthodox Church of Louisville, KY and St. George Orthodox Church in Cleveland, OH. He lived in the United States, serving various parishes from 1957 until 1964, when he returned to Lebanon. Moving back to Beirut, Kazan operated a bookstore there from 1964 to 1967.

=== Second Journey to America ===
While living in Beirut, in 1967, Kazan received a request to return to America from the newly appointed Metropolitan Philip Saliba, who succeeded Metropolitan Anthony as the Archbishop of the North American archdiocese. Metropolitan Philip's request, was for Basil Kazan to undertake a project of composing music for the entire year, and for all services. The composition was to be in English, and to follow the tradition Byzantine Chant, but to be composed in the English language, and in Western musical staff notation. This task would be the defining work of Basil's career, and would last for another 28 years until his retirement in 1995.

In order to be close to the Archdiocesan center in Englewood, New Jersey for his work in composing, Basil Kazan moved to New York, and served as head chanter at St. Mary's Antiochian Church in Brooklyn, NY.

In 1970, Kazan resigned from the Priesthood, and married Viola Habeeb. The couple stayed in Brooklyn, and Kazan continued to serve as head chanter of St. Mary's Church until his death in 2001. Also in 1970, Kazan began to serve as a translator at the Berlitz School and Translation Service, where he worked for 10 years until 1980. He also served, from 1973 to 1980, as an advisor to the Consulate General of Lebanon in New York City.

In 1974, the very first edition of the Byzantine Project was published. The first edition was entitled Phase I, Saturday Great Vesper Service, and was completed in February of that year. The volume included the hymns, in all Eight Byzantine Tones, for the Saturday Great Vespers service. This volume represents the first major publication of this type that had been made, up to that point, in English, and in the United States. Also in 1974, Bishop A. Shadrawi, the patriarchal Vicar General of Mexico and Central America asked Kazan to begin to compose music for the Divine Liturgy in Spanish. He also began to serve as the Assistant Examiner of the Board of Education in Brooklyn, which he did until 1984.

In 1976, the second phase of the Byzantine Project was published. This added the service of Sunday Matins to the Saturday Great Vespers volume.

=== Later years ===
Throughout the 1980s & early 1990s, Basil Kazan's work continued. His major works included settings for the feasts in the Menaion, Pentecostarion and Holy Week. It also included more smaller projects such as settings for Weddings, Funerals, Memorials, Akathists, Paraklesis, Presanctified Liturgy and the Holy Unction Service. Interestingly, Basil Kazan's work never included a full series of settings for the Divine Liturgy, possibly due to the prevalence of western-style choirs in Antiochian parishes.

In 1992, he received the Antonian Gold Medal of Merit from Metropolitan Philip Saliba, marking his 25th year of work on the Byzantine Music Project.

Basil Kazan's work on the "Byzantine Project" continued up until 1995, when his work was finally concluded with his retirement. By 1995, Kazan's work included 12-volumes of publications including the Menaion, Pentecostarion, Holy Week, Matins & Vespers.

In 2001, the Antiochian Archdiocese decided to digitize Basil Kazan's work, which up to that point, had been either copies of handwritten scores, or typewritten scores, the effort to digitize his publications continued up into the late-2010s. Basil Kazan died on November 11, 2001, preceding his wife Viola, who died 11 years later on July 1, 2012; they were buried together in Oceanview Cemetery on Staten Island in New York.
