= Tell Saoudhi =

Archeological site near Rayak, Lebanon

- Type: Tell
- Cultures: Neolithic
- Location: 1 km north of Tell Delhamiyeh near Rayak
- Region: Bekaa Valley

Site notes
- Excavation dates: 1966
- Archaeologists: R. Saidah Lorraine Copeland
- Condition: Ruins
- Public access: Yes

Tell Saoudhi is an archaeological site 1 km north of Tell Delhamiyeh near Rayak in the Beqaa Mohafazat (Governorate). It dates at least to the Neolithic.
