= Neba =

Neba or NEBA may refer to:

- Neba, Nagano, village in Nagano Prefecture, Japan
- New England Biotech Association, a coalition of biotechnology companies
- Neba'a Faour, an archaeological site in Lebanon
- Northeast Bolivian Airways, a Bolivian airline company
