= Beqaa =

Beqaa (Arabic: بقاع, Biqā‘) can refer to two places in Lebanon:

- Beqaa Governorate, one of six major subdivisions of Lebanon
- Beqaa Valley, a valley in eastern Lebanon and its most important farming region

== See also ==
- Kasbeel of the Book of Enoch, who utters the oath "Biqa"
