= Tell Hoch Rafqa =

Archaeological site in Beqaa Mohafazat, Lebanon

- Type: Tell
- Cultures: Neolithic
- Location: 1 km north of Hoch er Rafqa
- Region: Bekaa Valley

Site notes
- Excavation dates: 1963, 1965
- Archaeologists: Diana Kirkbride, James Mellaart, Lorraine Copeland, Peter J. Wescombe
- Condition: Ruins
- Public access: Yes

Tell Hoch Rafqa is an archaeological site 1 km north of Hoch er Rafqa, 4 km west of a bridge over the Litani River in the Beqaa Mohafazat (Governorate) in Lebanon. It dates at least to the Early Bronze Age.
