= Tell Serhan =

Archeological site in Lebanon

- Type: Tell
- Cultures: Neolithic, Bronze Age
- Location: 9km southeast of Rayak Air Base
- Region: Bekaa Valley

Site notes
- Excavation dates: 1933, 1954, 1957, 1966
- Archaeologists: Maurice Tallon, A. Kuschke, Lorraine Copeland
- Condition: Ruins
- Public access: Yes

Tell Serhan is an archaeological site 9 km southeast of Rayak Air Base, 4 km northeast of Bar Elias in the Beqaa Mohafazat (Governorate) in Lebanon. It dates at least to the Neolithic with middle and late Bronze Age materials plentiful.
