= Tell Ablah =

- Type: Tell
- Cultures: Neolithic
- Location: 3km west of Rayak
- Region: Bekaa Valley

Site notes
- Excavation dates: 1965
- Archaeologists: Lorraine Copeland, Peter J. Wescombe
- Condition: Ruins
- Public access: Yes

Tell Aalaq is an archaeological site 3k west of Rayak in the Beqaa Mohafazat (Governorate). It dates at least to the Neolithic or Chalcolithic.
