= Tell Beshara =

Archaeological site in Lebanon

- Interactive map of Tell Beshara
- Type: Tell
- Cultures: Middle Bronze Age
- Location: 120m southwest of Tell Hazzine
- Region: Bekaa Valley

Site notes
- Excavation dates: 1933, 1966
- Archaeologists: J. King, Lorraine Copeland, Peter J. Wescombe
- Condition: Ruins
- Public access: Yes

Tell Beshara is an archaeological site 120m southwest of Tell Hazzine in the Beqaa Mohafazat (Governorate). It dates at least to the Middle Bronze Age.
