= Tell Karmita =

- Type: Tell
- Cultures: Neolithic, Early Iron Age
- Location: 4km north of Bar Elias
- Region: Bekaa Valley

Site notes
- Excavation dates: 1966
- Archaeologists: Lorraine Copeland, Peter J. Wescombe
- Condition: Ruins
- Public access: Yes

Tell Karmita is an archaeological site 4 km north of Bar Elias, on the Zahle road in the Beqaa Mohafazat (Governorate), Lebanon. It dates at least to the Neolithic with early Iron Age materials also found.
