= Timeline of the 2008 fighting in Lebanon =

2008 fighting events in Lebanon

The timeline of events in the 2008 fighting in Lebanon is set out below.

== Timeline ==
=== May ===
==== May 8, 2008 ====
- 1 Amal fighter, 30 civilians killed

In street battles in Beirut one Amal fighter and six civilians are killed, among the dead were two women and one child.

==== May 9, 2008 ====
- 7 Hezbollah fighters, 2 Lebanese Democratic Party (LDP) fighters, 1 pro-government fighter

In street battles in Beirut one pro-government and two LDP fighters were killed. In street battles in Aley eight people, including seven Hezbollah fighters, are killed. In sporadic clashes in Sidon a man and his wife were killed; and in Bar Elias in the Bekaa Valley a woman was killed also.

==== May 10, 2008 ====
- 10 SSNP members, 9 pro-government fighters, 2 Hezbollah fighters, 2 soldiers, 2 civilians, 1 Australian citizen killed

A gunman fired on the funeral procession of the government supporter, who was killed the previous day in Beirut, leaving two people dead and several wounded. At least 14 people were killed in northern Lebanon in the town of Halba in clashes between the rival supporters. 10 of the dead were SSNP members, three were government loyalists and one was an Australian citizen who was trying to get information at the SSNP offices about evacuating from the city. Three Hezbollah fighters were attacked in Aley by pro-government Druze fighters leaving two of them dead and the third missing. Two soldiers were killed in fighting east of Beirut. Another person was killed in clashes in Sidon. A woman was killed in heavy street battles in Tripoli late in the evening.

==== May 11, 2008 ====
- 17 pro-government fighters, 21 Hezbollah fighters, 2 civilians killed

In heavy ground and artillery battles in the mountain town of Chouweifat and surrounding villages 40 people, including 21 Hezbollah and 17 pro-government Druze fighters and two civilians, were killed.

==== May 12, 2008 ====
- 1 civilian killed

In clashes in Tripoli one person was killed and at least six others wounded.

=== June ===
==== June 17, 2008 ====
- 3 civilians killed

In clashes in the Bekaa Valley three civilians were killed.

==== June 22, 2008 ====
- 1 policeman, 8 civilians killed

In clashes in Tripoli one policeman and eight civilians were killed.

=== July ===
==== July 25, 2008 ====
- 1 policeman, 8 civilians killed

In clashes in Tripoli one policeman and eight civilians were killed. Among the dead were two women and a 10-year-old child.

== Casualties ==
Based on the above-mentioned reports 109 people were reported to have been killed and one is missing.

- Pro-government fighters: 27 killed
- Opposition fighters: 43 killed, 1 missing
- Lebanese Army: 2 killed
- Lebanese police: 2 killed
- Lebanese civilians: 34 killed*
- Foreign civilians: 1 (Australian)

*22 of the 34 were most certainly confirmed to have been civilians, with eight of them women, two children and twelve men.

Breakdown of Opposition and Pro-government fighters fatality reports by groups
Group name	Opposition fighters	Pro-government fighters
Hezbollah	30	
Syrian Social Nationalist Party	10	
Lebanese Democratic Party	2	
Amal	1	
Future Movement		10
Progressive Socialist Party		17
TOTAL	43	27
Sources: The Daily Star, Ya Libnan, Alarabiya.net
