= Tell Jezireh =

- Interactive map of Tell Jezireh
- Type: Tell
- Cultures: Bronze Age
- Location: 6km south southwest of Bar Elias
- Region: Bekaa Valley

Site notes
- Excavation dates: 1927, 1966
- Archaeologists: R. Dussaud, J. King, Lorraine Copeland, Peter J. Wescombe
- Condition: Ruins
- Public access: Yes

Tell Jezireh is an archaeological site 6 km south southwest of Bar Elias in the Beqaa Mohafazat (Governorate). It dates at least to the Bronze Age.

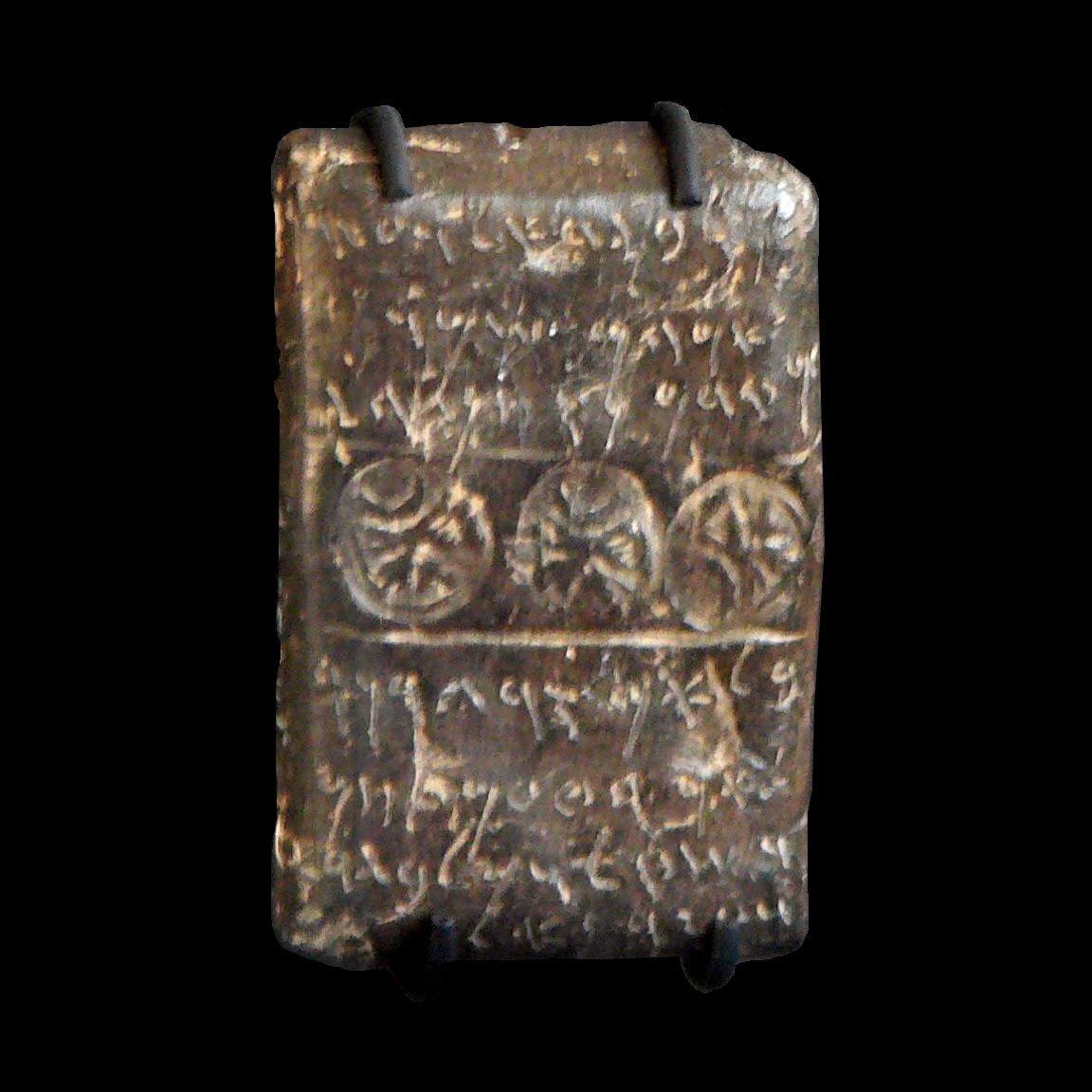
Tablet from Tell Jezireh
