= Wadi Jilat =

Seasonal stream in eastern Jordan

Wadi el Jilat
- Qilat, Wadi Qilat
- Location within Jordan
- 31°30′06″N 36°24′29″E
- Type: Wadi
- Periods: PPNB
- Cultures: Neolithic
- Location: Amman Governorate
- Region: Jordan

Site notes
- Height: 738 metres (2,421 ft) above sea level
- Area: 150 square metres (0.015 ha) drainage catchment
- Archaeologists: Andrew Garrard, Sue Colledge
- Condition: Ruins

Wadi Jilat is a seasonal stream (wadi) in the Badia of eastern Jordan. Part of its course runs through a steeply-incised ravine that retains water for much of the year, an unusual feature in the desert region.

The area is known for its archaeological significance, including a still-functioning dammed reservoir that may date back as far as the Nabataean period. Thirty two prehistoric sites were also discovered in the area by Andrew Garrard in the 1970s–80s. They include Wadi Jilat 6, an Early Epipalaeolithic megasite occupied from approximately 20,500 to 18,000 years ago. Together with Kharaneh IV, it is one of the two largest prehistoric sites in the Levant (c. 19,000 m^{2}) and has been interpreted as an seasonal aggregation camp. Wadi Jilat 7 is an early Neolithic site, providing the earliest known evidence of domesticated einkorn wheat, radiocarbon dated to 9500–9200 years ago.
