= Tell Derzenoun =

- Interactive map of Tell Derzenoun
- Type: Tell
- Cultures: Neolithic
- Location: 3km south southeast of Bar Elias
- Region: Bekaa Valley

Site notes
- Excavation dates: 1933, 1954, 1955, 1957
- Archaeologists: A. Jirku, Schaeffer, A. Kushke, Lorraine Copeland, Peter J. Wescombe
- Condition: Ruins
- Public access: Yes

Tell Derzenoun is an archaeological site 3 km south southeast of Bar Elias in the Beqaa Mohafazat (Governorate). It dates at least to the Neolithic.
