= Tell Ain Cerif =

Archaeological site in Lebanon

- Interactive map of Tell Ain Cerif
- Type: Tell
- Cultures: Chalcolithic
- Location: 4km north northwest of Rayak
- Region: Bekaa Valley

Site notes
- Excavation dates: 1966
- Archaeologists: A. Kuskhe, Lorraine Copeland, Peter J. Wescombe
- Condition: Ruins
- Public access: Yes

Tell Ain Cerif is an archaeological site 4 kilometres (2.5 mi) north northwest of Rayak in the Beqaa Mohafazat (Governorate), Lebanon. It dates at least to the Chalcolithic.
