= Tell Ayoub =

Archaeological site in Lebanon

- Type: Tell
- Cultures: Neolithic
- Location: 2km north of Bar Elias
- Region: Bekaa Valley

Site notes
- Excavation dates: 1930
- Archaeologists: Auguste Bergy, Henri Fleisch, Lorraine Copeland, Peter J. Wescombe
- Condition: Ruins
- Public access: Yes

Tell Ayoub is an archaeological site 2 km north of Bar Elias in the Beqaa Mohafazat (Governorate). It dates at least to the Neolithic.
