= Sawiri =

Town in eastern Lebanon

SAWIRAH الصويرة
- Village
- Location in Lebanon
- Coordinates: 33°41′13″N 35°54′17″E
- Country: Lebanon
- Governorate: Beqaa Governorate
- District: Western Beqaa
- Elevation: 3,350 ft (1,020 m)
- Time zone: UTC+2 (EET)
  - Summer (DST): +3

Sawiri (Levantine Arabic: الصويرة, romanized: eṣ-Ṣawīreh, also Souiri, Sawairy, or es-Sawiri) is a town in the eastern part of Lebanon.

Mayor is Mohamed Hamze Smiley Arabic: الرئيس محمد حمزه الصميلي

Vice Mayor Mahmoud Mohammed Janbien Arabic: الرئيس محمود محمد جانبين

Sawiri is located in the West Bekaa District near the Syrian border, in the governorate of Beqaa in the foothills of the eastern mountains. It is 1100 above sea level in a rugged area with many small valleys

== History ==
In 1838, Eli Smith noted it as Al Sawirah, Arabic: الصويري'الصويرة; village in West Beqaa at the Beqaa Valley.

sawirah.com

== Population ==
Sawiri's population is over 20,000 people with many of its inhabitants having immigrated to the United States, Brazil, Argentina, Venezuela, Canada and France in the 1900s. The major surnames or families in Sawirah are Amer, Balhis, Berro, Smaily, Youssef, Abdel Razzak, Zeitoun, Shouman, Abou Nemry, Taleb, Shalaby, Abou Arab, Chebli, Tahan, Salha, Abdallah, Zrara, Almoghabbat Janbien and Saleh.

The largest concentration of Sawiri people outside Sawiri are in Alberta Canada and in Brazil.

Sawiri people ancestors are about one third lower middle east (Phoenicians) another third is upper middle east (Kelds, Cannatine, etc) and the rest are of Arabic (hijaz), Egyptian, Turkish, and Caucas areas.

== Schools in Sawiri ==
Sawiri has several schools (Makased, now Rawafid) Public schools for elementary, middle and high school education and a private school called New High School

== Agriculture in Sawiri ==
Sawiri is an agriculture and service-oriented town. Most people own their land and come from a farming background. Sawiri produces lentils, figs, and Armenian cucumbers (mikthi). However, olive, Almond nut and cherry trees have been grown rapidly as well as grape vines of all sorts in the last 3 decades.

== Sawiri's borders ==
Sawiri is 62 km from Beirut and 55 km from Damascus. Masnaa border station from north is the end of Sawiri property lines and Manara town to the south and From the west, it borders Dakwee (Thakwee) mountains to the east all the way to Syrian Border through rugged heights. Majdel Anjar borders Swiri to the northwest. It is opposite the Tell Ain el Meten, a Heavy Neolithic archaeological site that was once used by the Pharaohs culture during the deforestation of Lebanon in prehistory. Some of the flints found at the site possibly date back to the Middle Paleolithic with other evidence of pottery from the Early Bronze Age and Middle Bronze Age.

== Bibliography ==
- Frauberger, Heinrich: Die Akropolis von Baalbek (Keller : Frankfurt a. M., 1892. - 14, 22 S. : überw. Ill.) (pdf 24,6 MB)
- Robinson, E.; Smith, E. (1841). Biblical Researches in Palestine, Mount Sinai and Arabia Petraea: A Journal of Travels in the year 1838. Vol. 3. Boston: Crocker & Brewster.
