= Tell Mekhada =

Coordinates: 33.7808°N 35.9639°E

- Interactive map of Tell Mekhada
- Type: Tell
- Cultures: Neolithic
- Location: 400m southwest of Nebaa Faour
- Region: Beqaa Valley

Site notes
- Excavation dates: 1965
- Archaeologists: Peter Wescombe
- Condition: Ruins
- Public access: Yes

Tell Mekhada is an archaeological site 400 m southwest of Nebaa Faour in the Beqaa Mohafazat (Governorate). It dates at least to the Neolithic.
