= Tell Qasr Labwe =

Archaeological site in Lebanon

- Interactive map of Tell Qasr Labwe
- Type: Tell
- Cultures: Neolithic, Ancient Rome
- Location: 1 km west of Labweh
- Region: Bekaa Valley

Site notes
- Excavation dates: 1954, 1957
- Archaeologists: A. Kushke
- Condition: Ruins
- Public access: Yes

Tell Qasr Labwe is an archaeological site 1 km west of Labweh in the Beqaa Mohafazat (Governorate). It dates at least to the Neolithic and there is a Roman temple on the site.
