= Al-Bazaliyeh =

Lebanese town

Al-Bazaliyeh is a town in Beqaa Governorate, Lebanon.

On March 27, 2026, the Israeli Air Force bombed a house, leading to the death of a pregnant woman inside.
