= Tell Kabb Elias =

Archaeological site

- Interactive map of Tell Kabb Elias
- Type: Tell
- Cultures: Neolithic
- Location: 3km southwest of Chtaura
- Region: Bekaa Valley

Site notes
- Excavation dates: 1966
- Archaeologists: Lorraine Copeland, Peter J. Wescombe
- Condition: Ruins
- Public access: Yes

Tell Kabb Elias is an archaeological site 3 km southwest of Chtaura in the Beqaa Mohafazat (Governorate). It dates at least to the Neolithic.
