= Tell El Ghassil =

Archaeological site

- Interactive map of Tell El Ghassil
- Type: Tell (mound)
- Cultures: Chalcolithic
- Location: 11 km (6.8 mi) north northeast of Rayak
- Region: Bekaa Valley

Site notes
- Excavation dates: 1966
- Archaeologists: Lorraine Copeland, Peter J. Wescombe
- Condition: Ruins
- Public access: Yes

Tell El Ghassil is an archaeological site located 11 kilometres (6.8 mi) north northeast of Rayak in the Beqaa Mohafazat (Governorate) of Lebanon.

== History ==
It dates at least to the Chalcolithic period. See finds of the Middle Bronze and Tomb 1, followed by the Late Bronze I. Among finds are Tell el-Yehudiyeh Ware.
