= Tell Masoud =

- Type: Tell
- Cultures: Chalcolithic, Early Bronze Age
- Location: west northwest of Tell Hazzine
- Region: Beqaa Valley

Site notes
- Excavation dates: 1955, 1957
- Archaeologists: A. Kushke, Lorraine Copeland
- Condition: Ruins
- Public access: Yes

Tell Masoud is an archaeological site west northwest of Tell Hazzine and 2 km away west from the Litani in the Beqaa Mohafazat (Governorate). It dates at least to the Chalcolithic.
