= Tell Rayak =

- Type: Tell
- Cultures: Neolithic
- Location: 1 km northeast of Rayak
- Region: Bekaa Valley

Site notes
- Excavation dates: 1954, 1966
- Archaeologists: A. Kuschke, Lorraine Copeland, Peter J. Wescombe
- Condition: Ruins
- Public access: Yes

Tell Rayak is an archaeological site 1 km northeast of Rayak in the Beqaa Mohafazat (Governorate). It dates at least to the Neolithic.
