= Hans Helbæk =

Danish archaeologist and palaeobotanist

Hans Peter Helbæk (8 April 1907, Roskilde – 10 February 1981, Kagerup) was a Danish archaeologist and palaeobotanist. He studied the plant remains from James Mellaart's excavations at Çatalhöyük and the last meal of the Grauballe Man.

Helbæk married twice. First to Helga Ørskov Hansen and then, in 1964, to British archaeologist Diana Kirkbride.

== Selected bibliography ==
- Jessen, Knud and Helbæk, Hans (1944), Cereals in Great Britain and Ireland in prehistoric and early historic times. Biologiske Skrifter, Det Kgl. Danske Videnskabernes Selskab, bd. III, nr. 2.
- Helbæk, Hans (1958), Grauballemandens sidste måltid, Kuml, Aarhus University Press, pp. 83–116.
- Helbæk, Hans (1970), Da rugen kom til Danmark, Kuml, Aarhus University Press.
