= Tell Murtafa =

Archaeological site in Lebanon

- Interactive map of Tell Murtafa
- Type: Tell
- Cultures: Early Bronze Age
- Location: 900 m (3,000 ft) northwest of Tell Bire village
- Region: Beqaa Valley

Site notes
- Excavation dates: 1933, 1966
- Archaeologists: A. Jirku, Lorraine Copeland
- Condition: Ruins
- Public access: Yes

Tell Murtafa is an archaeological site 900 m (3,000 ft) northwest of Tell Bire village in the Beqaa Mohafazat (Governorate). It dates at least to the Early Bronze Age.
