= Tell Delhamieh =

- Interactive map of Tell Delhamieh
- Type: Tell
- Cultures: Neolithic
- Location: 3km south southwest of Rayak
- Region: Bekaa Valley

Site notes
- Excavation dates: 1933, 1954, 1966
- Archaeologists: A. Jirku, A. Kushke, Lorraine Copeland, Peter J. Wescombe
- Condition: Ruins
- Public access: Yes

Tell Delhamieh is an archaeological site 3 km south southwest of Rayak in the Beqaa Mohafazat (Governorate). It dates at least to the Neolithic.
