= Tell Addus =

- Interactive map of Tell Addus
- Type: Tell
- Cultures: Early Bronze Age
- Location: 5km northwest of Baalbek
- Region: Bekaa Valley

Site notes
- Excavation dates: 1965
- Archaeologists: Lorraine Copeland, Peter J. Wescombe
- Condition: Ruins
- Public access: Yes

Tell Addus is an archaeological site 5 km northwest of Baalbek in the Beqaa Mohafazat (Governorate). It dates at least to the Early Bronze Age.
