= Tell Ahle =

Archaeological site dating back to the Early Bronze Age

- Type: Tell
- Cultures: Early Bronze Age
- Location: 18km north of Baalbek
- Region: Bekaa Valley

Site notes
- Excavation dates: 1966
- Archaeologists: A. Jirku, A. Kuskhe, Olga Tufnell, Lorraine Copeland, Peter J. Wescombe
- Condition: Ruins
- Public access: Yes

Tell Ahle is an archaeological site 18 km (11 mi) north of Baalbek in the Beqaa Mohafazat (Governorate). It dates to the Early Bronze Age.
