= Manara, Beqaa =

Manara المناره Hammara
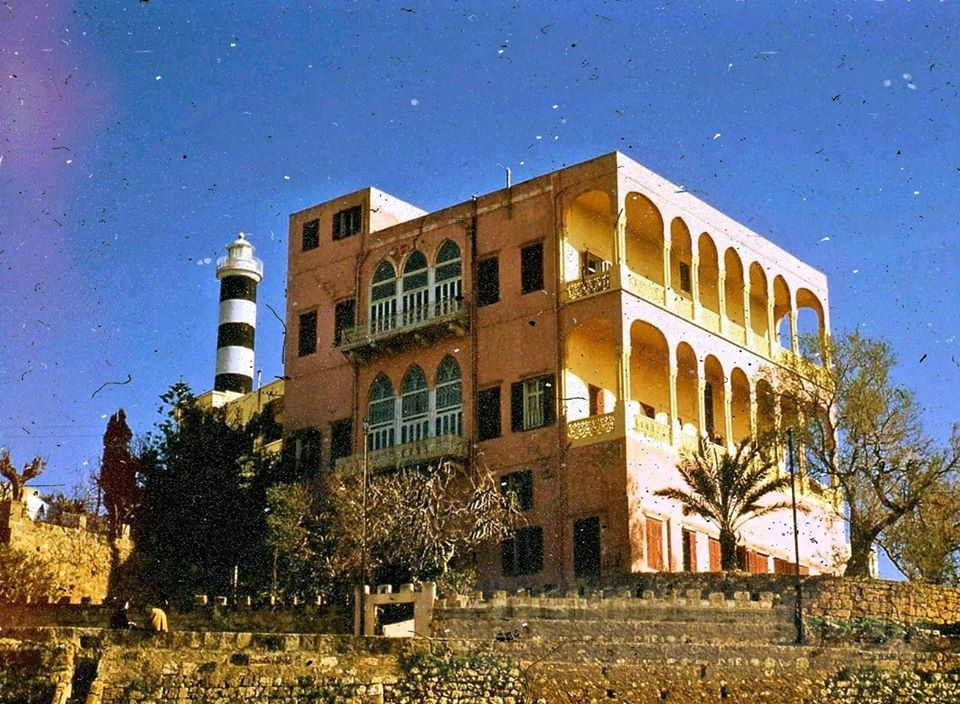
- Alzaher house, Almanara, 1965

- Location in Lebanon
- Coordinates: 33°38′53″N 35°53′10″E
- Country: Lebanon
- Governorate: Beqaa
- District: West Beqaa

Manara, also known as Hammara, is a municipality in the West Beqaa district of the Beqaa Governorate in eastern Lebanon. It is located approximately 65 kilometers (40 mi) east of the capital Beirut. Its average elevation is 1,160 meters (3,810 ft) above sea level and its jurisdiction covers 1,413 hectares. Its inhabitants are majority Sunni Muslims.
