= Tell Shaikh Hassan al Rai =

- Interactive map of Tell Shaikh Hassan al Rai
- Type: Tell
- Cultures: Neolithic, Medieval
- Location: 2 km south of el Marj, 2 km north of Hoch Harime
- Region: Bekaa Valley

Site notes
- Excavation dates: 1927, 1966
- Archaeologists: J. King, R. Dussaud, R. Saidah, Lorraine Copeland
- Condition: Ruins
- Public access: Yes

Tell Shaikh Hassan al Rai is an archaeological site 2 km south of el Marj, 2 km north of Hoch Harime in the Beqaa Mohafazat (Governorate) in Lebanon. It dates at least to the Neolithic with Medieval material also attested.

Tell Shaikh Hassan al Rai is famous for being the site of the first unquestioned evidence of the domestication of cats, after archaeologists found remains dating from the Uruk period (3500-3000 BCE) of cats smaller than the wildcat.
