= Tell Wardeen =

- Type: Tell
- Cultures: Early Bronze Age
- Location: 6 km east southeast of Bodai
- Region: Bekaa Valley

Site notes
- Excavation dates: 1954
- Archaeologists: A. Kuschke
- Condition: Ruins
- Public access: Yes

Tell Wardeen is an archaeological site 9 km northwest of Baalbek, 6 km east southeast of Bodai in the Beqaa Mohafazat (Governorate) in Lebanon. It dates at least to the early Bronze Age.
