= Tell Meouchi =

Archaeological site in Syria

- Type: Tell
- Cultures: Early Bronze Age
- Location: 3km south of Ablah
- Region: Beqaa Valley

Site notes
- Excavation dates: 1965
- Archaeologists: J. King, Lorraine Copeland
- Condition: Ruins
- Public access: Yes

Tell Meouchi is an archaeological site 2 km southwest of Tell Amara and 3 km south of Ablah in the Beqaa Mohafazat (Governorate). It dates at least to the Early Bronze Age.
