= Tell Aalaq =

Bronze Age archaeological site in Lebanon

- Interactive map of Tell Aalaq
- Type: Tell
- Cultures: Early Bronze Age
- Location: 9 km west of Baalbek
- Region: Bekaa Valley

Site notes
- Excavation dates: 1966
- Archaeologists: A. Kushke, Lorraine Copeland, Peter J. Wescombe
- Condition: Ruins
- Public access: Yes

Tell Aalaq is an archaeological site 9 km west of Baalbek in the Beqaa Mohafazat (Governorate). It dates at least to the early Bronze Age.
