= Tell Bir Dakoue =

Archeological site in Lebanon dating to the early bronze age

- Interactive map of Tell Bir Dakoue
- Type: Tell
- Cultures: Early Bronze Age
- Location: junction of the road between Dakoue and Hoch Harime
- Region: Bekaa Valley

Site notes
- Excavation dates: 1938, 1954, 1957
- Archaeologists: A. Kushke, Krenker and Schietzchmann, Godefroy Zumoffen Lorraine Copeland, Peter J. Wescombe
- Condition: Ruins
- Public access: Yes

Tell Bir Dakoue is an archaeological site at the junction of the road between Dakoue and Hoch Harime, 1 km north of the spring in the Beqaa Mohafazat (Governorate). It dates at least to the Early Bronze Age.
