= Tell Ain Sofar =

Early Bronze Age archeological site in Lebanon

- Type: Tell
- Cultures: Early Bronze Age
- Satellite of: Lebanon
- Location: south of Muallaka, southwest of Zahle
- Region: Beqaa Valley

Site notes
- Excavation dates: 1930
- Archaeologists: A. Jirku, Lorraine Copeland, Peter J. Wescombe
- Condition: Ruins
- Public access: Yes

Tell Ain Sofar (Arabic: تل عين صفر) is an archaeological site 2 km south of Muallaka, southwest of Zahle in the Mohafazat (Governorate) of Beqaa, in Lebanon. It dates back at least to the Early Bronze Age.
