= Tell Taalabaya =

- Type: Tell
- Cultures: Neolithic, Bronze Age
- Location: 2.5km southwest of the bridge at Maalaka
- Region: Bekaa Valley

Site notes
- Excavation dates: 1966
- Archaeologists: Peter Wescombe
- Condition: Ruins
- Public access: Yes

Tell Taalabaya is an archaeological site 2.5 km southwest of the bridge at Maalaka in the Beqaa Mohafazat (Governorate) in Lebanon. It dates at least to the Neolithic.
