= Tell Ain Saouda =

Archaeological site in Lebanon

- Location within Lebanon
- 33.998333°N 36.100833°E
- Periods: PPNB, Neolithic, Bronze Age Roman
- Location: 2 km (1.2 mi) south of Tell Neba'a Litani, Lebanon
- Region: Bekaa
- Part of: Village

Site notes
- Condition: Unknown
- Public access: Unknown

Tell Ain Saouda is a small Neolithic, archaeological tell, approximately 2 kilometres (1.2 mi) south of Tell Neba'a Litani, Lebanon.

It is a grey soiled site next to two springs and the Litani River. Materials recovered include flints such as tanged arrowheads, sickle blades, scrapers, and an axe. Pottery included flat bottomed jars, globe shaped jars and bowls. These were burnished, painted and red-washed with some incised decorations. These finds were similar to those from Tell Ain Nfaikh and other Beqaa Valley sites with a later neolithic dating and settlements extending into the Bronze Age and classical periods.
