= Tell Neba'a Chaate =

- Type: Tell
- Cultures: Chalcolithic
- Location: 6km north of Maakne
- Region: Beqaa Valley

Site notes
- Excavation dates: 1965
- Archaeologists: Frank Skeels, Lorraine Copeland
- Condition: Ruins
- Public access: Yes

Tell Neba'a Chaate is an archaeological site 6 km north of Maakne in the Beqaa Mohafazat (Governorate) in Lebanon. It dates at least to the Early Bronze Age.
