= Tell Majdaloun =

- Interactive map of Tell Majdaloun
- Type: Tell
- Cultures: Early Bronze Age
- Location: 10km southwest of Baalbek
- Region: Beqaa Valley

Site notes
- Excavation dates: 1954, 1966
- Archaeologists: A. Kushke, Lorraine Copeland, Peter J. Wescombe
- Condition: Ruins
- Public access: Yes

Tell Majdaloun is an archaeological site 1.5 km northwest of the village of the same name and 10 km southwest of Baalbek in the Beqaa Mohafazat (Governorate). It dates at least to the Early Bronze Age.
