= Tell Rasm El Hadeth =

Archaeological site in Beqaa, Lebanon

- Type: Tell
- Cultures: Neolithic
- Location: 18km north of Baalbek
- Region: Beqaa Valley

Site notes
- Excavation dates: 1933, 1954, 1965, 1966
- Archaeologists: A. Jirku, A. Kushke, M.J. Hajjar, Lorraine Copeland
- Condition: Ruins
- Public access: Yes

Tell Rasm El Hadeth is an archaeological site 18 km north of Baalbek in the Beqaa Mohafazat (Governorate). It dates at least to the Neolithic.
