= Tell Shamsine =

- Interactive map of Tell Shamsine
- Type: Tell
- Cultures: Neolithic
- Location: 1.75 km north northeast of Ain Anjar
- Region: Bekaa Valley

Site notes
- Excavation dates: 1966
- Archaeologists: F. Frick, Lorraine Copeland
- Condition: Ruins
- Public access: Yes

Tell Shamsine is an archaeological site 1.75 km north northeast of Ain Anjar in the Beqaa Mohafazat (Governorate) in Lebanon. It dates at least to the Neolithic.
