= McClelland sherd =

- Material: Clay
- Created: 2nd millennium BC
- Discovered: Tell Jisr, Lebanon, by McClelland
- Present location: Saint Joseph University, Beirut, Lebanon

The McClelland sherd, Tell Jisr sherd or El-Jisr sherd is a fragment of pottery discovered by McClelland at Tell Jisr, near Rashaya in Lebanon and first studied by George E. Mendenhall in 1971.

== Description ==
The ostracon displays a series of incisions in the pottery that have been suggested to be an early type of Bronze Age writing. The text has been compared to Byblian pseudo-hieroglyphic, but also Minoan Linear A and Linear B, Anatolian, Canaanite and various other old languages. It is regarded as a rare trace of early written communication and important for further academic investigation. The pottery sherd shows a badly defined row of symbols in what some consider to be an abstract linear rather than pictographic form of character. It has not been reliably dated however suggestions have been made of c. 1800 BC or earlier. It has a double rope moulding that is similar to other Middle Bronze Age pottery from the Euphrates valley area of Syria. Dr. Cherie J. Lenzen has also suggested similar features were noted on pottery found at Tell Irbid in northern Jordan. Despite calls for dismissal or denial of the sherd as a "by-form" of the alphabet by Frank M. Cross, Mendenhall has said that the sherd "clearly exhibits both the dâl and the thâ of later Eastern alphabets". He states "the sherd is perhaps older than any other alphabetic inscription so far discovered".
