= Tahun ben Aissa =

Archaeological site in Lebanon

- Type: Tell
- Periods: Neolithic
- Location: Beqaa Valley, Lebanon
- Part of: Settlement

Site notes
- Excavation dates: 1965–1966
- Archaeologists: Lorraine Copeland, Peter J. Wescombe
- Condition: ruins
- Public access: Yes

Tahun ben Aissa is an archaeological site about 3.5 kilometres southwest of Joub Jannine in the Beqaa Valley in Lebanon.

This archaeological site, located on the left bank of the Litani was studied in 1965–66 by Lorraine Copeland and Peter Wescombe. Materials found included flints used for heavy chopping including trapezoidal, oval and rectangular shaped axes. A few sickle blades with fine denticulation along with some scrapers and an oval shaped arrowhead were found. Analysis of the recovered materials enabled Jacques Cauvin and Marie-Claire Cauvin to suggest that the site was contemporary with the earliest neolithic levels at Byblos.
