= Tell El Hadeth =

- Type: Tell
- Cultures: Early Bronze Age
- Location: 14km west southwest of Baalbek
- Region: Bekaa Valley

Site notes
- Excavation dates: 1938, 1954
- Archaeologists: Krenker and Schietzschmann, A. Kushke, Lorraine Copeland, Peter J. Wescombe
- Condition: Ruins
- Public access: Yes

Tell El Hadeth is an archaeological site 14 km west southwest of Baalbek in the Beqaa Mohafazat (Governorate). It dates at least to the Neolithic or Chalcolithic.
