= Tell Ain el Meten =

Human settlement in Lebanon

- Location within Lebanon
- 33.683333°N 35.918611°E
- Periods: Heavy Neolithic, Neolithic
- Location: Beqaa Valley, Lebanon
- Part of: Factory

Site notes
- Archaeologists: Peter Wescombe, J. King
- Condition: ruins
- Public access: Yes

Heavy Neolithic axe of the Qaraoun culture - Thick and heavy biface, retouched all over with jagged and irregular edges.

Tell Ain el Meten is a tell in the area of El Meten in the Rashaya District, south-eastern portion of the Bekaa Governorate of the Republic of Lebanon. It is located opposite the village of Sawiri.

A Heavy Neolithic archaeological site of the Qaraoun culture was discovered by Peter Wescombe and J. King in 1966 along a track 200 metres (0.12 mi) north of the Ain el Meten spring and about 300 metres (0.2 mi) west of the road. The tell is cone shaped and composed of rubble stones and grey soil. Imported brown worked flint tools were found along with others made from Nummulitic, Eocene flint in the fields on the lower slopes. Another type of brittle and drab-coloured flint found in the area was unsuitable for toolmaking. The material was determined to be of Heavy Neolithic or possibly earlier Paleolithic origins.

Pottery was also found suggested to date to the Early Bronze Age and Middle Bronze Age. This was evidenced by sherds with flat bases, grey or cream burnishing. The grey burnished sherds were equated to the Syrian bottle type. Various other sherds were found with finger impressed rims, to which could not be assigned a definite date. A handle from the Cypriot II stage was also found along with traces of occupation in the Late Iron Age and Islamic periods.

The site was largely intact in 1966 with terracing for fruit trees in the area and a rocky crest of the tell, which had been ploughed.
