= New England Biotech Association =

The New England Biotech Association (NEBA) is a coalition of biotechnology companies, academic institutions, pharmaceutical companies, and trade organizations from all six New England States.

NEBA serves as a regional policy and public affairs voice for the biotechnology and biopharmaceutical industry.

NEBA is a non-profit, member driven organization, with over 600 members.

The chairman of NEBA is Paul Pescatello, director of Connecticut United for Research Excellence -(CURE.)

In 2010, NEBA advocated against measures that would harm the biotechnology industry in Maine and other New England states. The organization also launched a website www.MassRxHelp.org to help consumers save money on prescription medications.
