= Derek Roe =

Derek Arthur Roe (31 August 1937 – 24 September 2014) was a British archaeologist most famous for his work on the Palaeolithic period.

Roe was born in St Leonards-on-Sea, Sussex and grew up in Kent.

Educated at St Edward's School in Oxford, he undertook his National Service with the Royal Sussex Regiment and the Intelligence Corps in Berlin. He went on to study Archaeology and Anthropology at Peterhouse, Cambridge, graduating with first-class honours in 1961. Whilst studying for his PhD he became a lecturer at Oxford University. There, he set up the Donald Baden-Powell Quaternary Research Centre which opened in 1975. In 1997, he became Professor of Palaeolithic Archaeology at Oxford.

He excavated at many seminal Palaeolithic sites including Kalambo Falls and Olduvai Gorge as well as producing a gazetteer of British Middle and Lower Palaeolithic sites. He also played a key role in the autobiography of Mary Leakey.

He married Fiona Greig, a fellow archaeologist, and had two children. After their divorce, he married Sarah Milliken, an archaeologist and landscape architect.

Roe died of cancer on 24 September 2014 after a short illness.

== Sources ==
- Milliken, S, and J Cook (eds) (2001). A Very Remote Period Indeed. Papers on the Palaeolithic presented to Derek Roe, Oxford: Oxbow. ISBN 978-1-84217-056-4.
