= Talia, Lebanon =

Talia طليا
- Village
- Location in Lebanon
- Coordinates: 33°56′10″N 36°05′50″E
- Country: Lebanon
- Governorate: Baalbek-Hermel Governorate
- District: Baalbek District
- Elevation: 1,130 m (3,710 ft)
- Time zone: UTC+2 (EET)
  - Summer (DST): +3

Talia (Arabic: طليا, romanized: Ṭalyā) is a municipality in Baalbek District, 73 kilometers from Beirut. Its elevation is 1030 meters above sea level.

The population is mostly Greek Orthodox Christian.
