= Neba'a Faour =

Archaeological site in Lebanon

- Interactive map of Neba'a Faour
- Type: Tell
- Periods: PPNB, Neolithic
- Location: Beqaa Valley, Lebanon
- Part of: Settlement

History
- Built: c. 8200-6200 BC

Site notes
- Material: Limestone, Soil, Pebbles
- Excavation dates: 1965
- Archaeologists: Lorraine Copeland, P.J. Wescombe
- Condition: ruins
- Public access: Yes

Neba'a Faour, Tell Neba'a Faour, Mashna'et el Faour, Neba Faour or Nebaa Faour is a large, low-lying archaeological tell mound in the Bekaa Valley, Lebanon inhabited in the late 7th and early 6th millennium BC. It was initially discovered by Lorraine Copeland and Peter J. Wescombe in 1965 near the road from Beirut to Damascus, 5 miles from the border with Syria. The site was mainly composed of soil and pebbles on limestone bedrock, the site showed heavy erosion since it was abandoned and recent damage from modern construction in the area. It has been suggested as an example of an aceramic stage following the Pre-Pottery Neolithic B (PPNB) that is called the Pre-Pottery Neolithic C (PPNC); sites of comparable culture are Tell Ramad, Labwe and others in the Byblos region. It is generally dated between the second half of the 7th millennium and the beginning of the 6th millennium BC.

== Materials recovered ==
Most of the material recovered from this open cast site came from surface finds along with a 7 feet (2.1 m) to 8 feet (2.4 m) core of Neolithic deposits. Neolithic levels revealed evidence of stone-wall footings and a series of distinctive cream, lime-plaster floors. Black, beige or brown flint was knapped at the site, and tools recovered included numerous scrapers, cores for blades, Byblos- and Amouq-point arrowheads, javelins, sickle blade elements, burins and borers. Lebanese sites of this date usually reveal heavy tools, but only two hand axes were recovered at this site. A stone bowl with a fine bead rim was also found.

The site is notable for finds of a type of precursor to clay pottery called "White Ware", or "Vaisselle Blanche". This was made with a type of lime plaster mixed with grey ashes, which when fired it turned into a hardened, white material that resembles limestone. Vessels were formed by coiling the plaster around baskets. Fragments of large vessels were found that are thought to have been used like "portable silos".
