= British Archaeological Reports =

British archaeological book series

- Traded as: BAR Publishing
- Founded: 1974
- Founder: Anthony Hands and David Walker
- Country of origin: United Kingdom
- Headquarters location: Oxford, UK
- Nonfiction topics: Archaeology
- No. of employees: Less than 15
- Official website: https://www.barpublishing.com

The British Archaeological Reports Series contains over 3,500 books of academic archaeological research, including monographs, excavation reports, revised theses and conference proceedings. Founded in 1974, BAR Publishing is one of the world's largest publishers of academic archaeological research, covering all major aspects of archaeology globally. The BAR Series consists of the International series and the British series.

== History ==
The founders, Anthony Hands (1934–2013) and David Walker, started the publishing business when, in the late 1960s, they were unable to publish the site reports of their own archaeological dig, Shakenoak Roman Villa in Oxfordshire, both because of the size of the output but also due to the lack of funding and institutional support. The prohibitive cost of printing in Britain at that time, and the lack of specialist publishers willing to publish archaeological site reports, meant that Hands, Walker, and their colleague Conant Brodribb ended up self-publishing. This involved buying a printing machine and undertaking the full production of their own books, before selling to readers via mail. To their surprise, they were able to make a profit, so set out to act as the publisher to other excavation reports, though much of their output became broader than the expected archaeological reports: by 1994, only 8% of their British Series and 2% of their International Series were excavation reports.

Hands and Walker wanted to include in the BAR series archaeology from areas of the world which had previously been unable to get their research out to an international audience. In part, this was to keep the company commercially viable, preventing it from becoming unprofitable due to a low demand for academic archaeological works in Britain, by providing and therefore selling to a wider market. It was not an easy task to reach the key archaeologists in countries such as Russia, the far eastern USSR, the communist countries of eastern Europe, and Spain under Franco, and involved long slow postal communications in a wide variety of languages. However, the results were effective and for the first time the archaeology of these countries became easily available in the west. The archaeology of the rest of Europe, the Americas, Australia, Asia, etc. was also included.

The BAR series is published in English, French, German, Italian and Spanish, the five main languages of archaeology. The books are also on occasion published in other languages, with a full English translation. BAR publishes around seventy peer-reviewed books each year.

== Publication ==
The company that publishes the series, BAR Publishing (trading name of British Archaeological Reports (Oxford) Ltd), is an independent publisher that, from the outset, has been dedicated to academic archaeology and to publishing original work. Until 1989, all BARs were printed by Hands and Walker on their own printer, and collated, stapled, and guillotined in-house. In 1991, Tempvs Reparatvm began publishing the series before being replaced by Archaeopress and John and Erica Hedges. By 2015, the Hedges had retired and Archaeopress began concentrating on their own range of imprints.

As of 2020, BAR Publishing began trialing digital access of their catalogue to institutional libraries. BAR now publishes books that are fully open-access and available on an open licence, such as Domestic Multicrafting for Exchange at Prehistoric Ejutla, Oaxaca, Mexico, by Gary M. Feinman and Linda M. Nicholas.

== Reception ==
In the twentieth anniversary publication, it was noted that the BAR series has significantly contributed to archaeology through rapidly publishing conference proceedings at a low cost, as well as making doctoral theses available to a wider audience. Sebastian Rahtz also argued that, through publishing the Computer Applications in Archaeology conferences, BAR made their work wider known, as little had been published prior to this.
