= Tell Saatiya =

Archaeological site

- Type: Tell
- Cultures: Neolithic
- Location: 4.4km south southwest of Majdal Anjar
- Region: Bekaa Valley

Site notes
- Excavation dates: 1954, 1957
- Archaeologists: A. Kushke
- Condition: Ruins
- Public access: Yes

Tell Saatiya is an archaeological site 4.4 km south southwest of Majdal Anjar on the road to Rachaya in the Beqaa Mohafazat (Governorate) in Lebanon. It dates at least to the Neolithic with large quantities of Early Bronze Age materials.
