= Tell Ain Nfaikh =

Archaeological site in Lebanon

- Ain Nfaikh
- Type: Tell
- Periods: PPNB
- Cultures: Neolithic
- Location: north of Rayak
- Region: Bekaa Valley

Site notes
- Excavation dates: 1965-1966
- Archaeologists: Lorraine Copeland, Peter Wescombe
- Condition: Ruins
- Public access: Yes

Tell Ain Nfaikh or Ain Nfaikh is an archaeological site in an area c. 100 square metres (1,100 ft^{2}) of a ploughed field 300 metres (980 ft) east of the Litani, north of Rayak on the west of the Beqaa Valley in Lebanon.

It was first studied by Lorraine Copeland and Peter Wescombe in 1965–1966. A wide variety of materials were recovered from the site and its immediate area that are now held in the Saint Joseph University in Beirut. Stone tools from the surface included numerous short, wide, sickle blades with fine denticulation or nibbling along with tanged arrowheads, scrapers, chisels, axes, burins, obsidian and a small green stone axe. Pottery resembled middle periods at Byblos and coloured similar to at Ard Tlaili with red or black washes. Both fine and coarse shards were found of jars with a variety of collared and flared necks and flat bases along with bow rims such as those found at Jericho. Vessels were decorated with stabbed and incised designs, finger pressed around the rim and smoothed by hand or with straw. A painted lattice pattern was detected on at least one piece. Comparisons were made with Middle and Late Neolithic periods at Byblos showing inhabitation from several phases. The site was also used in Bronze Age and Classical times and material from these phases has been found over a wide area around the site.
