= Tell Khazzami =

Archaeological site in Syria

- Tell El Khazzami
- Location within Syria
- 33.411522°N 36.515558°E
- Type: Tell
- Periods: Neolithic
- Location: 25 km (16 mi) Southeast of Damascus, Syria
- Region: Damascus basin
- Part of: Village

Site notes
- Length: 150 metres (490 ft)
- Width: 150 metres (490 ft)
- Excavation dates: 1967
- Archaeologists: Henri de Contenson
- Condition: Ruins
- Management: Directorate-General of Antiquities and Museums
- Public access: Yes

Tell Khazzami or Tell El Khazzami is a small prehistoric, Neolithic Tell, about 150 metres (490 ft) in diameter, located around 25 kilometres (16 mi) Southeast of Damascus in Syria. It was destroyed by the construction of Damascus International Airport.

Four soundings were taken in a rescue mission in 1967 by Henri de Contenson who produced the first report in 1968. A single level of occupation was found with compartmentalised buildings made of regular shaped bricks and lime plaster floors with small hearths. Relatively advanced flint sickles and blades were found along with obsidian blades and relatively few arrowheads. Mortars and a base made of basalt were found. Contenson suggested that harvesting of cereals would have been more important than hunting for the inhabitants. Extensive amounts of pottery were recovered from the site including hand finished flat base dishes, deep bowls and jars. Vessels had handles, knobs, decoration and often given a red wash, which according to Contenson indicated a dating of the site similar to the later Neolithic stages of Byblos; he dated the site to the late 5th millennium BC.

== Literature ==
- de Contenson, Henri., Rapport préliminaire sur les fouilles à Tell el Khazzami en 1967, Annales Archéologiques Arabes Syriennes XVIII, 1968, p. 55-62.
- de Contenson, Henri., Le Néolithique à l'Est.de la Ghouta : Aswad, Ghoraifé et Khazzami, Contribution française à l'archéologie syrienne 1969-1989, Damas, 1989, p. 33-36.
