= Olivier Aurenche =

French archaeologist

- Known for: Work on the prehistory of the Levant and Near East
- Scientific career
- Fields: Archaeology

Olivier Aurenche is a French archaeologist working in the prehistory of the Levant and Near East.
