= Tell Kirri =

- Interactive map of Tell Kirri
- Type: Tell
- Cultures: Neolithic
- Location: 3km northeast of Qoliate
- Region: Akkar plain

Site notes
- Excavation dates: 1966
- Archaeologists: Maurice Dunand, G. Harding, Lorraine Copeland, Peter J. Wescombe
- Condition: Ruins
- Public access: Yes

Tell Kirri is an archaeological site in the Akkar plain, 3 km northeast of Qoliate in the North Mohafazat (Governorate). It dates at least to the Neolithic.
