= Haouch Tall Safiyeh =

Haouch Tall Safiyeh حوش تل صفية
- Village
- Location in Lebanon
- Coordinates: 34°01′30″N 36°08′23″E
- Country: Lebanon
- Governorate: Baalbek-Hermel Governorate
- District: Baalbek District

Area
  - Total: 1.95 sq mi (5.05 km^{2})
- Elevation: 3,363 ft (1,025 m)

Population
  - Total: 2,000
- Time zone: UTC+2 (EET)
  - Summer (DST): +3

Tell Safiyeh
- حوش تل صفية (Arabic)
- Interactive map of Tell Safiyeh
- Type: Tell
- Cultures: Neolithic
- Location: 3km southwest of Yaate near Baalbek
- Region: Bekaa Valley

Site notes
- Excavation dates: 1933, 1954, 1957, 1966
- Archaeologists: A. Jirku, A. Kuschke, Lorraine Copeland
- Condition: Ruins
- Public access: Yes

Haouch Tall Safiyeh or Haouch Tal Safiya (Arabic: حوش تل صفية, romanized: Ḥawsh Tall Ṣafiyeh) is a village and an archaeological site 3 km southwest of Yaate near Baalbek in Baalbek-Hermel Governorate. It dates at least to the Neolithic period. The village is mostly Shiite, with 499 Shiite voters, 171 Maronites and 14 Sunnis.

== History ==
In 1838, Eli Smith noted Haush Tell Safiyeh as a Metawileh village in the Baalbek area.

== Bibliography ==
- Robinson, E.; Smith, E. (1841). Biblical Researches in Palestine, Mount Sinai and Arabia Petraea: A Journal of Travels in the year 1838. Vol. 3. Boston: Crocker & Brewster.
