= Tell Neba'a Litani =

- Neba'a Litani
- Type: Tell
- Periods: PPNB
- Cultures: Neolithic
- Location: 9 kilometres (5.6 mi) west of Baalbek
- Region: Bekaa Valley

Site notes
- Excavation dates: 1965-1966
- Archaeologists: Lorraine Copeland, Peter Wescombe
- Condition: Ruins
- Public access: Yes

Tell Neba'a Litani or Neba'a Litani is a medium size tell 9 kilometres (5.6 mi) west of Baalbek in the northern Beqaa Valley of Lebanon. I It is located near the spring which is the main source of the Litani River at a height of 1,002 metres (3,287 ft). It was first studied by Lorraine Copeland and Peter Wescombe in 1965-1966 and is accessible via a road which turns from Hoch Barada to the left. Materials recovered included flint tools such as scrapers and the blade from a segmented sickle. Pottery included burnished, painted and red-washed shards, some with incised decoration or lattice patterns. The material resembled finds from Byblos and Ard Tlaili leading Copeland and Wescombe to suggest a Late Neolithic occupation for the tell that extended into the Bronze Age.
