= Telul eth-Thalathat =

Archaeological site in Nineveh Province, Iraq

- Location within Iraq Location within Near East
- 36°34′N 42°32′E
- Type: settlement
- Periods: Ubaid, Uruk, Ninevite 5 periods
- Location: Nineveh Governorate, Iraq
- Region: Mesopotamia

Site notes
- Excavation dates: 1956-1957, 1964-1965, 1976
- Archaeologists: N. Egami, S. Fukai

Telul eth-Thalathat is an ancient Near Eastern archaeological site located 40 miles (64 km) west of Mosul and just east of Tal Afar in Nineveh Governorate (Iraq). Its roughly five mounds (sometimes described as four) were occupied at various times, mainly the Ubaid, Uruk, and Ninevite 5 periods.

== Archaeology ==
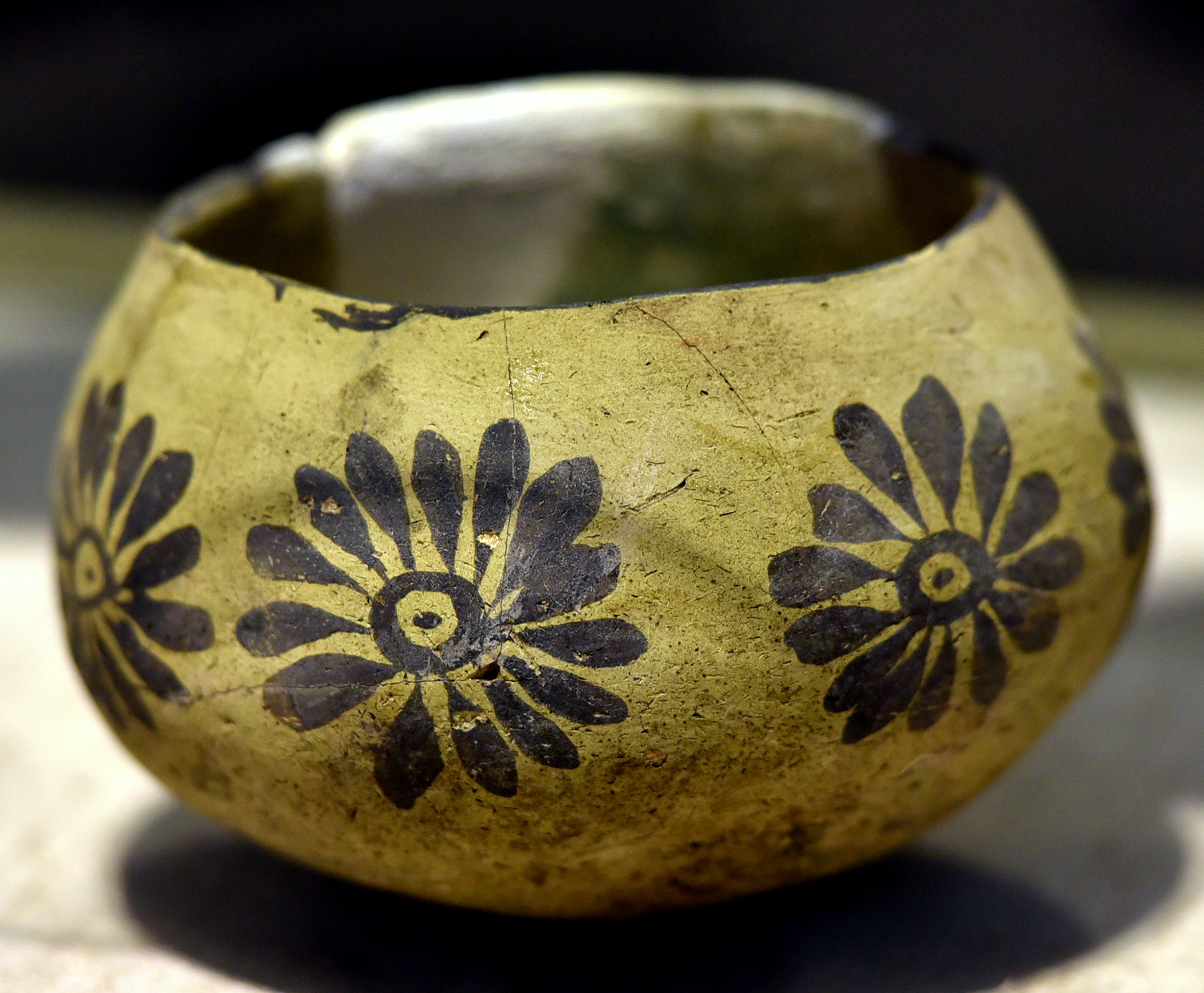
Pottery bowl from Telul eth-Thalathat, Iraq. Ubaid period, c. 5000 BCE. Iraq Museum

The site consists of at least five (sometimes described as four) tells or settlement mounds. Telul eth-Thalathat was excavated for four seasons between 1956 and 1965 and again in 1976 by a team from the University of Tokyo Iraq-Iran Archaeological Expedition. Only tells I, II, and V were excavated. The main focus was to establish a complete Ninevite 5 sequence at Tell V. The first two seasons, in 1956 and 1957, were led by N. Egami and worked at Telul eth-Thalathat II, chosen because it was the lowest mound and had the mildest slope, making it the easiest to excavate. Burials, residential areas, and a presumed temple were uncovered. The final season was led by S. Fukai. Among the small finds was a small square stamp seal with two human figures dated to the late 4th or early 5th millennium BC. Late Ubaid Coba bowls were also found as well as beveled rim bowls, diagnostic pottery of the late uruk culture.

Telul eth-Thalathat II is 100 meters by 60 meters and rises about 8 meters above the plain. In the surface layer (top 20-30 centimeters) A number of flint and obsidian artifacts were found including blades, scrapers, polished stone axes, club-heads and pendants as well as clay artifacts including spindle whorls, horn-shaped clay pegs, clay sling balls, and figurines of animals and a bird. These artifacts dated to the Ubaid, Uruk and Nineveh V periods indicated that there were originally later levels not eroded away. A number of burials, both adults and children, were excavated, a few containing bronze grave goods. One large building was much more solidly constructed (with 45 centimeter walls) was excavated and termed a Temple but could have also served an administrative function. Pottery shards found on the floors dated to the Uruk period. Two samples were taken for radiocarbon dating (calibration method unknown). One, on Level XVI, dated to 5410 BC and the other, on Level XV, dated to 5570 BC. Excavators defined an 16 level stratigraphy for Telul eth-Thalathat II:

- Levels XV-XVI - Pottery Neolithic
- Levels XII-XIV - Early Northern Ubaid
- Levels Vllb-XI - Late Northern Ubaid
- Level VIla - Terminal Ubaid
- Levels I-VI - Middle Uruk

Telul eth-Thalathat V was occupied only in the Ninevite 5 period. A 16 meter by 8 meter trapezoidal granary with 10 rooms was excavated. Its foundation was a sub-structure of parallel walls covered by reed matting and it had been destroyed by fire. Large amounts of grain, mostly barley, was found in jars and on floors. A building with two concentric round constructions, presumed to be a kiln, was also excavated. Two carbonized grain samples from the granary building were radiocarbon dated (calibration method unknown) to 2860-2395 BC and 3145-2550 BC. Another source has 2250 BC for the later sample.

== History ==
Telul eth-Thalathat was occupied in the Ubaid, Nineveh 5, and Uruk periods, as well as during Middle Assyrian times. Excavations have revealed over 20 kilns and a number of burials, as well as some figurines and spindle whorls. Eleven Neolithic clay tokens were also recovered. On Telul eth-Thalathat V a single period Ninevite 5 settlement was found. It included a 6 by 18 meter building interpreted as a granary.

== See also ==
- Cities of the ancient Near East
