= Tell Zeitoun =

- Tell Dnaibe
- Location within Lebanon
- 33.466667°N 35.733333°E
- Type: Tell
- Periods: PPNB
- Cultures: Neolithic
- Location: 8 kilometres (5.0 mi) southwest of Rashaya
- Region: Bekaa Valley

History
- Built: 6900 - 5800 cal. BC

Site notes
- Excavation dates: 1954, 1966, 1968
- Archaeologists: Kuschke A Lorraine Copeland; J. King; Jacques Besançon; Francis Hours
- Condition: Ruins
- Public access: Yes

Tell Zeitoun also called Tell Dnaibe, is an archaeological site 8 kilometres (5.0 mi) southwest of Rashaya in Lebanon at an altitude of 900 metres (3,000 ft).

It is situated in the valley of the Upper Hasbani (Wadi el-Fatir) on the right bank, north-east of the village of Dnaibe, east of the road. It was first recorded by A. Kuschke in 1954 followed by Lorraine Copeland and J. King in 1966 and lastly by Jacques Besançon and Francis Hours in 1968. Besançon recovered a fragment from an arrowhead a pick or hammer and a serrated sickle blade. These gave a very slight dating, suggesting Ubaid occupation equivalent to early Neolithic Byblos.
