= Tell Jisr =

Hill and archaeological site in Lebanon

- Tell el-Jisr
- Tell ej Jisr
- Location within Lebanon
- 33.64°N 35.778611°E
- Type: Tell
- Periods: PPNB, Neolithic, Chalcolithic
- Location: 1.5 kilometres (0.93 mi) northwest of Joub Jannine, Lebanon
- Part of: Settlement

History
- Built: c. 8200-6200 BC

Site notes
- Excavation dates: 1965-1966
- Archaeologists: Lorraine Copeland, Peter J. Wescombe
- Condition: ruins
- Public access: Yes

Tell Jisr, Tell el-Jisr or Tell ej-Jisr is a hill and archaeological site 1.5 kilometres (0.93 mi) northwest of Joub Jannine in the Beqaa Valley in Lebanon.

It was discovered in 1965-1966 by Lorraine Copeland and Peter Wescombe but the perimeter and extent of the find was not fully determined. It is suggested to have been surrounded by fertile arable land suitable for crop cultivation and was likely a river crossing, situated on the east bank of the Litani.

== Excavation ==
A large amount of the material collected by Henri Fleisch and M. Tallon is now kept by the Museum of Lebanese Prehistory, part of Saint Joseph University. Flint tools were of the heavy type suggested to have been used for deforestation, they included trapezoidal axes, choppers, a variety of scrapers including advanced fan scrapers, segmented sickle blades with fine denticulation and some obsidian.

The range of pottery found included stone and basalt bowls and vessels ranging from coarse White Ware to fine, burnished and decorated sherds. A spectrum of jar designs were found with some having red or cream washes. The materials show an established neolithic settlement with many similarities to Byblos and lower Jordan Valley sites that flourished until the Bronze Age. The tell is also notable as the location of the discovery of a fragment of pottery called the McClelland Sherd, Tell Jisr Sherd or El-Jisr Sherd that shows incisions suggested to be the oldest alphabetic writing yet discovered.
