= Andrew Garrard =

British archaeologist

Andrew Garrard is a British archaeologist and Reader in Early Prehistory at the UCL Institute of Archaeology. He is a former director of the British Institute at Amman for Archaeology and History. He has written and assisted with a large number of articles and papers. He has a BSc in Zoology and Geology from Newcastle University. Also a postgraduate certificate in prehistoric archaeology from Cambridge University and a PhD in Archaeology, also from Cambridge. He has worked on various project in Jordan and the Qadisha Valley Project in Lebanon.
