= Tell Dibbine =

Mountain in Lebanon

- Ijon
- Ijon
- Interactive map of Tell Dibbine
- Type: Tell
- Cultures: Neolithic, Israelite, Phoenician, Greek, Roman, Byzantine, Arabian
- Associated with: Cannanites
- Location: 2km north of Marjayoun
- Region: Nabatieh Governorate

History
- Built: Around 10,000 BCE to 8,000 BCE
- Built by: Ijonians
- Abandoned: 8th century BCE; Sometime during Ottoman rule

Site notes
- Excavation dates: 1927, 1933, 1954, 1957,
- Archaeologists: R. Saidah, A. Kushke, Lorraine Copeland, Peter J. Wescombe
- Condition: Ruins
- Public access: Yes

Tell Dibbine is an archaeological site 2 km north of Marjayoun in the plain of El Marj in the Nabatieh Governorate. It dates at least to the Neolithic. It was also known in the ancient world as Ijon. Many artifacts have been found including statues (currently lost), columns, and many more... The people of this settlement could be Hivites, or most possibly Phoenician.

According to the Books of Kings in the Hebrew Bible, Ijon and the nearby towns of Dan and Abel-beth-maachah were sacked by Ben-Hadad I of Aram Damascus in the ninth century BCE during his war with the northern Kingdom of Israel. Ijon is referred to once again in the same book as one of the towns that Tiglath-Pileser III of the Neo-Assyrian Empire conquered from Israel before deporting the local Israelites to Assyria, around 733 BCE.

After this period, there appears to be no archeological evidence of settlements which could imply it was abandoned during this period, until around 500 B.C. After this date, the tell seems to have been settled by Greco-Phoenician colonists as a trade center.

Further archeological evidence indicates that Ijon flourished during the Roman period as a transit spot for traders. Byzantine settlement is also evident by coins found in the area, yet the Tell appears to have started declining in importance and population for unknown reasons.

It is possible that Niqbata of Ayun (Hebrew: נקבתה דעיון), a place referenced in the Baraita on the "Boundaries of the Land of Israel" as part of the delineation of the northwestern border of Jewish resettlement following the return from Babylonian exile, refers to a place near the tell. Scholars suggest that the text probably reflects a historical reality dating to the Hasmonean or Herodian periods, around the 2nd or 1st century BCE.

After the Byzantine period, traces of Arabian conquest of the area appear, yet it only seems to have lasted for no more than a few decades. The tell at this point may have been totally abandoned or settled by a tiny population returning to a small village. The most logical explanation could be that the settlement could have moved to the modern village of Dibbin. The Ottomans may have used the Tell as a lookout points and possibly set up a barracks there, yet no evidence implies that during the Ottoman period any kind of settlement remained there.

== Bibliography ==
- Guérin, Victor (1880). Description Géographique Historique et Archéologique de la Palestine (in French). Vol. 3: Galilee, pt. 2. Paris: L'Imprimerie Nationale. (p. 280)
- Robinson, Edward; Smith, Eli (1841). Biblical Researches in Palestine, Mount Sinai and Arabia Petraea: A Journal of Travels in the year 1838. Vol. 3. Boston: Crocker & Brewster. (p. 375)
