= Ard Tlaili =

Tell mound in Beqaa Valley, Lebanon

- Tell Ard Tlaili
- Location within Lebanon
- 34.06°N 36.08°E
- Type: Tell
- Periods: PPNB, Neolithic
- Location: 11 km (7 mi) northwest of Baalbek, Lebanon
- Part of: Settlement

History
- Built: c. 8200-6200 BC

Site notes
- Excavation dates: 1965-1966
- Archaeologists: Lorraine Copeland, Peter J. Wescombe, Diana Kirkbride
- Condition: ruins
- Public access: Yes

Ard Tlaili or Tell Ard Tlaili is a small tell mound archaeological site in a plain at the foot of the Lebanon Mountains 11 km (7 mi) northwest of Baalbeck, in the Beqaa Valley in Lebanon.

It was first surveyed and studied in 1965–66 by Lorraine Copeland and Peter Wescombe with excavations later in the 1960s by Diana Kirkbride. The perimeter of the mound was buried under a metre of soil but the remains of rectangular buildings were found in 2 phases. Building walls were of wall made of stiff earth or clay with pebble bases and large stones in the upper layers. The floors were layered with white plaster with plastered and even burnished walls. Hearths and other areas were constructed of plaster or clay.

The wide variety of materials recovered included a stone assemblage of tools, obsidian blades, basalt bowls and hammers, clay sling ammunition, finely denticulated flint blades, scrapers, borers and a few axes. Pottery included Halafian painted shards both pattern and plain burnished with incised decoration including horizontal or vertical lines with dots, waves, zig-zags and cross-hatched designs. some with an application of red wash. These finds were significant as they represented the most southerly Halaf type painted pottery yet found. Red, orange, brown and black burnished bowls and jars were found in upper levels, with lower levels showing more coarse shards smoothed by hand or with straw. This little farming village shares the material culture of Byblos and southern Syrian and Halaf sites to the north.

The carbon 14 dating of charcoal from the different levels at Ard Tlaili gave a short date range between c. 5710 until c. 5780 BC.
