= Peter Wescombe =

British diplomat

Peter Wescombe (4 January 1932 – 25 November 2014) was a British diplomat, amateur archaeologist, historian and founding member of the Bletchley Park Trust.
