= Tell Hazzine =

Archeological site of interest

- Interactive map of Tell Hazzine
- Type: Tell
- Cultures: Early Bronze Age
- Location: 11km south southwest of Baalbek
- Region: Bekaa Valley

Site notes
- Excavation dates: 1933, 1949-50
- Archaeologists: A. Jirku, M. Simson, Lorraine Copeland, Peter J. Wescombe
- Condition: Ruins
- Public access: Yes

Tell Hazzine is an archaeological site 11 km south-southwest of Baalbek in the Beqaa governorate in Lebanon. It dates at least to the Early Bronze Age.
