= Chtaura =

Chtaura شتورا
- Location in Lebanon
- Coordinates: 33°48′53″N 35°51′17″E
- Country: Lebanon
- Governorate: Beqaa Governorate
- District: Zahle District

Government
  - Type: Mayor : Nicolas Assi نقولا عاصي
- Elevation: 2,990 ft (910 m)
- Time zone: UTC+2 (EET)
  - Summer (DST): +3
- Area code: 1801

Chtaura (Arabic: شتورا, romanized: Shtawrā) is a town in Lebanon in the fertile Beqaa valley located between the Mount Lebanon and Syria. It is located halfway on the Beirut–Damascus highway. It is located 44 kilometres (27 mi) from Beirut.

Chtaura is the valley's hub for banking, transportation, and commerce, with many hotels and restaurants on the main road. From Chtaura, travelers can depart for Zahlé, Baalbek, or Damascus.

== History ==
On January 29, 1983, the Israeli-run Front for the Liberation of Lebanon from Foreigners detonated a car bomb close to the Fatah HQ at Chtaura (also named Shtura), and another in West Beirut, close to the HQ of the left-wing Al-Mourabitoun. Some sixty people were killed and hundreds wounded.

For almost 30 years, during the Lebanese Civil War, the Syrian Arab Army's military headquarters for the Beqaa Valley was in Chtaura. On 24 November 1989, following the assassination of President René Moawad, his successor, Elias Hrawi, was elected by a hastily gathered assembly of 53 MPs in the Chtaura's Park Hotel.

== Climate ==
The area east of Lebanon is known for its dryness. It rarely rains in Chtaura in the summer, and there is a lack of humidity. The summers are warm, with temperatures reaching 36 degrees Celsius. In winter there are an average of 3-4 snowstorms yearly.

== Population ==
Chtaura's population has steadily grown since its founding. A century ago, Chtaura had less than two- thousand inhabitants and 70 houses. In the early 20th century, the Ottomans developed Chtaura to be the cultural hub of the Beqaa Valley due to its strategic location, and the population jumped to about 10,000-15,000 people. The population continued to grow throughout the twentieth century, and today the town is home to about 60–80,000 people. The town had a small Armenian community up until the start of the Lebanese Civil War.
