= Labweh =

Village in Baalbek, Lebanon

- اللبوة (Arabic)
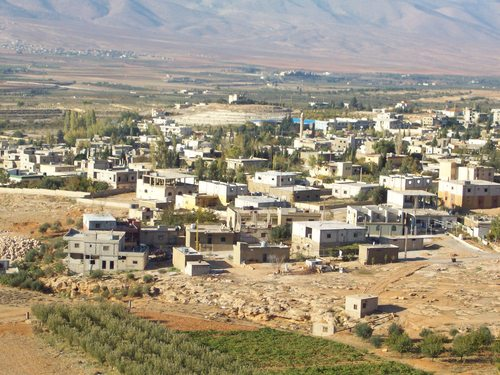
- Labweh village

- Location within Lebanon
- 34.197317°N 36.352392°E
- Type: Tells
- Periods: PPNB
- Cultures: Neolithic, Roman, Byzantine
- Location: 26 kilometres (16 mi) northeast of Baalbek
- Region: Bekaa Valley
- Part of: Settlements

History
- Built: c. 6910 to 6780 BC (from 3 limited samples)

Site notes
- Excavation dates: 1966, 1969
- Archaeologists: Diana Kirkbride, Lorraine Copeland, Peter Wescombe
- Condition: Ruins
- Public access: Yes

Labweh (Arabic: اللبوة), Laboué, Labwe or Al-Labweh is a village at an elevation of 950 metres (3,120 ft) on a foothill of the Anti-Lebanon Mountains in Baalbek District, Baalbek-Hermel Governorate, Lebanon.

== History ==
The Neolithic settlements at Labweh have been dated to at least the 7th millennium BC. It has been suggested that it was known to the Egyptians as Lab'u, to the Assyrians as Laba'u and as Lebo-hamath to the Hebrews. This has been associated with the "entrance of Hamath" mentioned in the Books of Kings and the Book of Ezekiel, noted as the Northern border of King Solomon's territory, but subsequently lost to the Syrians. Jeroboam II, king of Israel, is said to have "restored the territory of Israel from the entrance of Hamath to the Sea of the Arabah (the Dead Sea)".

Labweh in the original Syriac tongue means "heart" or "center", it also has been suggested to come from the Arabic for "lion" or "lioness". The village has several archaeological sites of interest including three old caves with Roman-Byzantine sarcophagi and the remains of a temple. There are also remains of a Byzantine bastion and a Roman dam suggested to date to the reign of Queen Zenobia. Legend suggests that channels were carved through the rock to send water to her lands in Palmyra, Syria.

In 1834, Burckhardt Barker noted: "I came to a village called Labweh, after having passed an encampment of Turkomans to the right of the road, at a place called Shaad. Labweh is at the foot of the range of Anti-Libanus on the top of a hillock, near which passes a small stream which has its source in the adjoining mountains, and after flowing for several hours through the plain, falls into the basin from which springs the Orontes." In 1838, Eli Smith noted Lebweh as a Metawileh village in the Baalbek District.

== Labweh Springs and Labweh River ==
The village is located on a hill 26 kilometres (16 mi) northeast of Baalbek, which gives its name to the Labweh Springs and Labweh River, one of the sources of the Orontes River. The Labweh river flows for approximately 20 kilometres (12 mi) through rocky desert. It then cascades into a lake and wider stream at another village called Er-Ras, considered to be the source of the Orontes. This flows onwards northeast, fed by numerous other streams from Lebanon's mountains.

== Archaeological sites ==
Soundings and analysis of archaeological sites in Labweh were made by Lorraine Copeland and Peter Wescombe in 1966 with later excavations by Diana Kirkbride in 1969. Tell Labweh, Tell Labweh South or Labweh I sits to the south of the village with another site to the north. The surface of Tell Labweh had been damaged by modern agriculture and it had been cut in half by road construction. Several burials were discovered inside the remains of rectangular buildings with white and red plaster floors. The remains of stone walls were found at lower levels and it is thought that the buildings may have used mud bricks at higher levels.

Early Neolithic finds included a large number of fragments of limestone White Ware or "Vaisselle Blanche", along with later pottery called dark faced burnished ware or DFBW. Only one vessel was reconstructed from the initial excavations; a bowl with combed finishing. Other shards included jars and bowls of a black, brown, or red colour, one showed a straw wiped finish normally found in sites further South in the Jordan Valley. Others showed decorations such as chevrons, incised patterns, and corded impressions. Flints were similar to those found at Tell Ramad and included Byblos points, hooks, scrapers, borers and burins. Burials were found within two houses, which were excavated and found to be similar to those in earlier PPNB and PPNA sites. A range of sickle blades were found in the basal deposits and higher levels showing the evolution of denticulated and segmented cutting edges with similarities to those found at the oldest neolithic Byblos. Three initial samples were Radiocarbon dated suggesting a range of dates between 6780 and 6910 BC; a date range covering only c. 130 years. The range of finds at the site has however helped to reveal some aspects of the transition through neolithic stages.

Tell Labweh North is another large archaeological site, a few hundred meters north on the other side of the village and springs. Finely denticulated sickle blades, arrowheads and trapezoidal, flaked axes and fragments of whiteware along with burnished pottery with patterns and a fragment of obsidian were collected from the surface of the site. Most of the finds indicated settlement around the time of Tell Labweh (South) and Byblos. Fauna would have included forest animals and numerous domesticated cattle, sheep, and goats.

== Roman temple ==
There are the ruins of a Roman temple in the village that are included in a group of Temples of the Beqaa Valley. It was a prostyle type but only one block of the western wall remained visible. Modern construction built a house inside the temple. There are around twenty temples located between Labweh and Ain el-Baid.

== Literature ==
- Burckhardt Barker, W. (1837). "Notes Made on a Journey to the Source of the River Orontes in Syria, in September, 1834". Journal of the Royal Geographical Society of London. 7: 95–102.
- Copeland, Lorraine and Westcombe, Peter, Inventory of Stone Age Sites in Lebanon Part 2: North - South - East Central Lebanon Volume 42 (Pages 1–174) Mélanges de l'Université Saint-Joseph (Beirut Lebanon), 1966.
- Kirkbride, Diana, Early Byblos and the Bakaa, Volume 45 (Pages 43–60), Mélanges de l'Université Saint-Joseph (Beirut Lebanon), 1969.
- Robinson, E.; Smith, E. (1841). Biblical Researches in Palestine, Mount Sinai and Arabia Petraea: A Journal of Travels in the year 1838. Vol. 3. Boston: Crocker & Brewster.
