= Diana Kirkbride =

British archaeologist

Diana Victoria Warcup Kirkbride-Helbæk, FSA (22 October 1915 – 13 August 1997) was a British archaeologist who specialised in the prehistory of south-west Asia.

== Biography ==
She attended Wycombe Abbey School in High Wycombe and served in the Women's Royal Naval Service during the Second World War. She completed a postgraduate diploma at University College London in 1950 studying Mesopotamian and Palestinian archaeology under Sir Max Mallowan and Dame Kathleen Kenyon. Kirkbride went to work on the excavations of Jericho from 1952 to 1955. In 1953, she began fieldwork in Jordan, including the restoration of the Jerash Theatre and excavations at Petra in 1956. During her studies of the Paleolithic and Neolithic of the area, she excavated a small rock shelter called Wadi Madamagh and made excavations at Ard Tlaili in Lebanon. She also discovered a major Neolithic site at Beidha where she led the excavations for the British School of Archaeology in Jerusalem from 1958 until 1967.

It was during this work that she met Danish paleobotanist Hans Helbæk whom she married at the end of the 1960s. She continued work in Iraq in the 1970s where she made another discovery of another Neolithic site called Umm Dabaghiyah. After her husband died of a stroke in 1981 she returned to Beidha for a season of excavations in 1983. She also finished work compiling the results from Beidha and Umm Dabaghiyah and started planning a new excavation of a Nabataean temple at Wadi Rum which was not completed before her death in August 1997 at Aarhus, Denmark.

== Positions held ==
- Director of the British School of Archaeology in Iraq.
- Oxford University's Gerald Avery Wainwright Fellowship in Near Eastern Archaeology
- Fellowship of the Society of Antiquaries

== Selected bibliography ==
- Kirkbride, Diana & Garrod, Dorothy Anne Elizabeth. Excavation of the Abri Zumoffen, a paleolithic rock-shelter near Adlun, South Lebanon, s.n., 1961
- Kirkbride, Diana & Kenyon, Kathleen Mary, Scarabs, British School of Archaeology, 1969.
- Kirkbride, Diana, Early Byblos and the Beqa'a, Beyrouth, 1969.
- Kirkbride, Diana, Five seasons at the pre-pottery neolithic village of Beidha in Jordan, in: Palestine Exploration Quarterly; 1966.
- Kirkbride, Diana & Kenyon, Kathleen Mary, Excavations at Jericho 1957-58, Palestine Exploration Fund, 1960.
