= Bar Elias =

Bar Elias بر الياس
- Location in Lebanon
- Coordinates: 33°46′30″N 35°54′00″E
- Country: Lebanon
- Governorate: Bekaa Governorate
- District: Zahlé District

Government
  - Mayor: Rida Al Mais

Area
  - City: 7 km^{2} (2.7 sq mi)
  - Metro: 35 km^{2} (14 sq mi)

Population
  - City: 40 000
  - Metro: 75 000
- Time zone: UTC+2 (EST)
  - Summer (DST): +3

Bar Elias (Arabic: Arabic: برالياس, romanized: Barilyās; also transliterated Barelias, Barr Elias or Bar Ilyas) is a town located in the Zahlé District, Bekaa Governorate, Lebanon. With around 60,000 inhabitants, mostly Sunni Muslims, it is the second largest town, after Zahlé, in the Zahlé District. Bar Elias is a village of the Bekaa Valley, the center of Bekaa. It is known widely for its transit passes, as it is halfway between Beirut and Damascus.

As the distance between the center of the northern Bekaa and the south became important because of its central valleys and on the international line of the most important economic centers and the largest commercial markets. Bar Elias is easily accessible from all directions and in the center of the Bekaa Valley.

Bar Elias is 900 m above sea level, at a distance of 51 km from Beirut via Damascus-Chtoura. It is spread over both sides of the international line between Beirut and Damascus over the exterior 4 km. A green plain extends across distances up to Anjar to the east, Zahlé to the west, Kafr Zabad and Addalhamiah to the north, and Almarj to the south.

It consists of a vast land area of about 35000 dunums (3500 hectares), of which about 7000 dunums are residential and the rest agricultural.

== History ==
In 1838, Eli Smith noted Burr Elyas as a Sunni Muslim, Greek Catholic and Maronite village in the Beqaa Valley.

== Geography ==
The town is situated 52 km (32.31 mi) to the east of the Lebanese capital Beirut.

=== Climate ===
Bar Elias is located in the East of Lebanon. Its weather is known for its dryness. It rarely rains in Bar Elias in the summer, there is indeed a lack of humidity. The summers are very warm, with temperatures reaching 35 degrees Celsius. The winters are rather cold, and also characterized by heavy snow.

=== Population ===
Bar Elias' population has grown since its founding. At the end of the eighteenth century, Bar Elias had less than a thousand inhabitants and 50 houses. By the late 1850s, the population jumped to about 7-10,000 people. The population continued to grow throughout the twentieth century. Today, Bar Elias is home to about 60-80,000 Lebanese.

Bar Elias is the largest Sunni town in much of the Bekaa Valley. 15-20% of the city is Christian; Zahlé province, where Bar Elias is located, has a Christian majority. Like the Christians in Zahlé whose majority is Greek Catholic, 90% of the Christians of Bar Elias are Catholic Christians and 10% Maronite Christians. There used to be a number of Druze living in Bar Elias, but their number declined because of communal tensions.

=== Agriculture ===
Bar Elias is situated at the heart of Lebanese agriculture, the Bekaa which is known for its numerous vast plains.

=== Facilities ===
Like neighboring towns and villages, Bar Elias boasts many restaurants.

== Demographics ==
In 2014 Muslims made up 90.16% and Christians made up 9.27% of registered voters in Bar Elias. 89.32% of the voters were Sunni Muslims and 6.94% were Greek Catholics. The remaining 3.74% are Shiites

=== Religion ===
Bar Elias is predominantly Sunni Muslim. There are, however, a number of Christians who live in the town. There are more than four mosques in the town and two churches.

== Politics ==
=== Government ===
The municipality of Bar Elias is located in the district of Zahlé, one of the eight districts in Lebanon. Free elections produced a Municipality council of 18 members representing most of the families in the town.

=== Bar Elias in Lebanese Politics ===
Bar Elias houses many political parties and political families. Since 1992 - date of the first elections after the end of the war - all the elected Sunni Muslim deputies for Zahlé district were originally from Bar Elias: Ali Maita (lawyer), Dr. Mohamad al Mais and Dr. Assem Araji.

== Bibliography ==
- Robinson, E.; Smith, E. (1841). Biblical Researches in Palestine, Mount Sinai and Arabia Petraea: A Journal of Travels in the year 1838. Vol. 3. Boston: Crocker & Brewster.
