= Rayaq =

Town in Lebanon

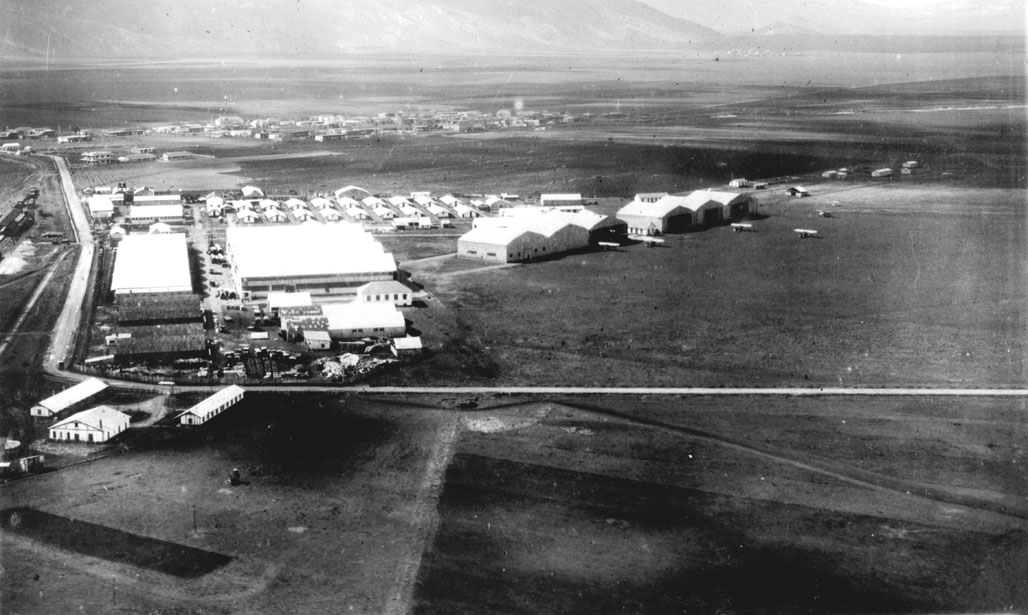
- Rayaq air strip in Lebanon

- Location within Lebanon
- 33.850°N 36.017°E
- Type: Surface site
- Periods: Shepherd Neolithic
- Location: 500 metres (0.31 mi) north of Rayaq, Lebanon

Site notes
- Material: Alluvial soil
- Excavation dates: 1965
- Archaeologists: Lorraine Copeland, Frank Skeels
- Public access: Yes

Rayaq - Haouch Hala (Arabic: رياق, romanized: Rayāq; also romanized Rayak) is a Lebanese town in the Beqaa Governorate near the city of Zahlé. In the early 20th century and up to the 1975 outbreak of the civil war, it was Lebanon's most important railway center, where the 1.05-m Beirut–Damascus line met the standard-gauge line north to Baalbek, Homs, and Aleppo. It now has an air base and a hospital. Rayak Air Base was bombed by the Israeli Air Force during the 2006 Lebanon War. The landing strip was severely damaged as a result.

== Archaeology ==
Rayaq North is a Shepherd Neolithic archaeological site located on either side of the main road, 500 metres (0.31 mi) north of Rayaq. Flint tools were found there by Lorraine Copeland and Frank Skeels during a survey of 1965. Along with the Shepherd Neolithic series of blade-butts and end-scrapers, another series of large cores and flakes were found that Henri Fleisch considered similar to materials found at Serain and Fleywe. They are thought to be Mousterian, Levalloiso-Mousterian or Heavy Neolithic.

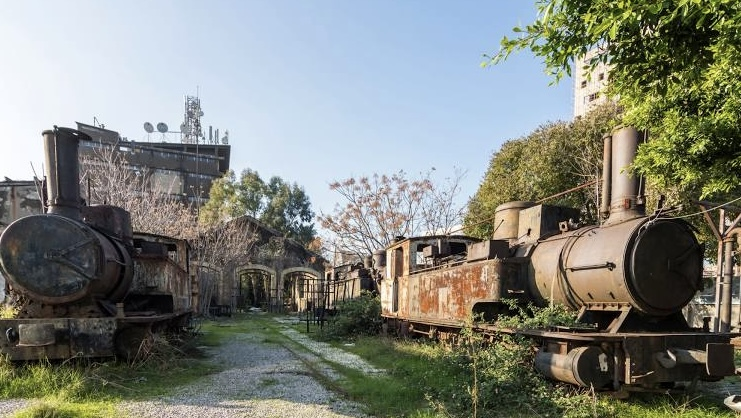
Rayak railway station

== History ==
In 1838, Eli Smith noted both Reyak and Haush Hala as Christian villages in the Baalbek area.

Prior to 1914 there was a broad-gauge railway from Aleppo through Hama and Homs which reached the Beirut to Damascus narrow-gauge line at Riyaq. Both railways were built and owned by French companies.

During the First World War, the military airport was built by German troops. In 1918, the British army bombed the railway station and destroyed it.

On August 7, 1933, two French aviators (Maurice Rossi and Paul Codos), aboard a Blériot 110, broke the world record for straight-line distance. They landed in Rayak after covering a distance of 9,104 km without stopping, in 55 hours, from New York.

During the Syria campaign in July 1941, the British bombed the French base and Rayak depots held by Vichy regime troops.

The first Free French fighter squadron (Alsace Fighter Group) was created there on September 15, 1941.

In September 1942, General de Gaulle visited the pilots at the Rayak base, and the No. 3 Normandie Fighter Group (the future Normandie-Niémen) was established there the following month.

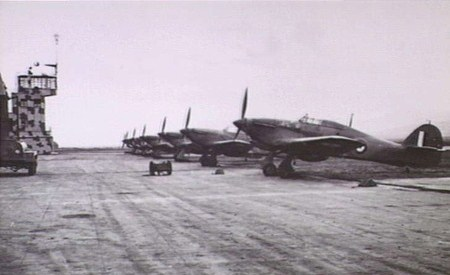
Hawker Hurricane of the Royal Australian Air Force at Rayak in 1942.

On October 10, 1943, the 3/3 Ardennes Fighter Squadron was born there. The Lebanese Air Force was created on June 1, 1949.

A French M10 Wolverine tank destroyer from the 3rd Squadron of the Colonial Tank Hunter Regiment (RCCC) was named Rayak during the Second World War.

The Lebanese Civil War from 1975 to 1990 interrupted all railway traffic. In 2002, an attempt to restore the Rayak-Damascus link failed.

== Notable people ==
- Charles Elachi, director of the American Jet Propulsion Laboratory from 2001 to 2016
- Romain Gary, French novelist
- Elie Maakaroun, writer and poet
- Jean Tulasne, aviator
- Jean Makaron, Lebanese diplomat
- Raymond Baaklini, Lebanese diplomat

== Bibliography ==
- Robinson, E.; Smith, E. (1841). Biblical Researches in Palestine, Mount Sinai and Arabia Petraea: A Journal of Travels in the year 1838. Vol. 3. Boston: Crocker & Brewster.
