= Governorate =

Administrative division of a country that is headed by a governor

A governorate or governate is an administrative division headed by a governor. As English-speaking nations tend to call regions administered by governors either states or provinces, the term governorate is typically used to calque divisions of non-English-speaking administrations.

The most common usage are as a translation of Persian "Farmandari" or the Arabic Muhafazah. It may also refer to the guberniya and general-gubernatorstvo of Imperial Russia or the gobiernos of Imperial Spain.

== Arab countries ==
The term governorate is widely used in Arab countries to describe an administrative unit. Some governorates combine more than one Muhafazah; others closely follow traditional boundaries inherited from the Ottoman Empire's vilayet system.

With the exception of Tunisia, all translations into the term governorate originate in the Arabic word muhafazah (Arabic: مُحَافَظَة).

- Governorates of Bahrain
- Governorates of Egypt
- Governorates of Iraq (official translation, sometimes also translated as province)
- Governorates of Jordan
- Governorates of Kuwait
- Governorates of Lebanon
- Governorates of Oman
- Governorates of Palestine
- Governorates of Saudi Arabia
- Governorates of Syria
- Governorates of Tunisia (the local term is wilayah)
- Governorates of Yemen

== Germany ==
In the modern German states of Baden-Württemberg, Bavaria, Hesse, and North Rhine-Westphalia, as well as others in the past, there are sub-state administrative regions - Regierungsbezirke, lit. 'governmental districts', which are sometimes translated into English as "governorates".

During the time of the Third Reich, a "General Government for the Occupied Polish Areas" (German: Generalgouvernement für die besetzten polnischen Gebiete) existed. The German (based on a traditional Prussian term) is sometimes translated as General Governorate.

== Greece ==
The "New Lands" added to the Kingdom of Greece by the 1912–1913 First Balkan War—Epirus, Macedonia, Crete, and islands in the eastern Aegean Sea—initially continued their Ottoman divisions and administrators but these were overseen by new Greek governor generals. The territory was reorganized in 1915 amid the First World War, but the governorate generals (Greek: Γενικαὶ Διοικήσεις, Genikaí Dioikíseis, sing. Γενική Διοίκησις, Genikí Dioíkisis) continued in use in various forms until their complete abolishment in 1955.

== Italian Empire ==
- Governorates of Italian East Africa

== Portuguese Empire ==
In the Portuguese Empire, a governorate general (Portuguese: governo-geral) were a colonial administration. They usually were created in order to be a centralized government over smaller colonies or territories of the Portuguese Empire.

Governorate Generals of the Portuguese Empire:

- Governorate General of Brazil (1549–1572 / 1578–1607 / 1613–1621)
- Governorate General of Bahia (1572–1578 / 1607–1613)
- Governorate General of Rio de Janeiro (1572–1578 / 1607–1613)

== Romania ==
During World War II, Romania administrated three governorates, two of them part of Romania, the Bessarabia Governorate and the Bukovina Governorate, and one under Romanian administration, but not as an integral part of Romania, the Transnistria Governorate.

== Russian Empire ==
- History of the administrative division of Russia
- Governorate (Russia) and Category:Governorates of the Russian Empire

=== Congress Kingdom of Poland ===
- See Subdivisions of Congress Poland

=== Grand Duchy of Finland ===
- Governorates of the Grand Duchy of Finland

== Spanish Empire ==
In the Spanish Empire, the gobernaciones ("governorships" or "governorates") were an administrative division, roughly analogous to a province directly beneath the level of the audiencia or captaincy general, and the viceroy in areas directly under the viceroy's administration. The powers and duties of a governor were identical to a corregidor but a governor managed a larger or more prosperous area than the former.

== Ukraine ==
When Ukraine claimed autonomy in 1917 and then independence from Russia in 1918, it inherited the imperial subdivision of its land with nine governorates, two okruhas, and three cities with special status. Each governorate (Ukrainian huberniia) was subdivided by the smaller unit of county (povit) and still smaller volost.

By the end of the Soviet-Ukrainian war in 1920, the Soviets had made them part of the Ukrainian SSR. Soviet Ukraine was reorganized into twelve governorates, which were reduced to nine in 1922, and then replaced with okruhas in 1925.

== Vatican City ==
Under the Fundamental Law of Vatican City State, the pope's executive authority for Vatican City is exercised by the Pontifical Commission for Vatican City State, a legislative body led ex officio by the President of the Governorate of Vatican City State. The other key officers of the Governorate are the General Secretary and the Vice General Secretary. All three officers are appointed by the pope for five-year terms.
