= Beqaa Governorate =

Governorate of Lebanon

Beqaa Governorate مقاطعة البقاع
- Governorate of Lebanon
- Map of Lebanon with Beqaa highlighted
- Coordinates: 33°50′N 35°54′E
- Country: Lebanon
- Capital: Zahlé

Government
  - Governor: Kamal Abou Jaoudeh (Independent)

Area
  - Total: 1,433 km^{2} (553 sq mi)

Population (31 December 2017)
  - Total: 534,342
  - Density: 372.9/km^{2} (965.8/sq mi)
- Time zone: UTC+2 (EET)
  - Summer (DST): UTC+3 (EEST)
- ISO 3166 code: LB-BI

Beqaa Governorate (Arabic: مقاطعة البقاع, romanized: Muqāṭaʿat al-Biqāʿ) is a governorate in Lebanon and one of the nine governorates of the country. It is located in the eastern part of Lebanon and borders Syria. The capital of the governorate is the city of Zahlé.

== Districts ==
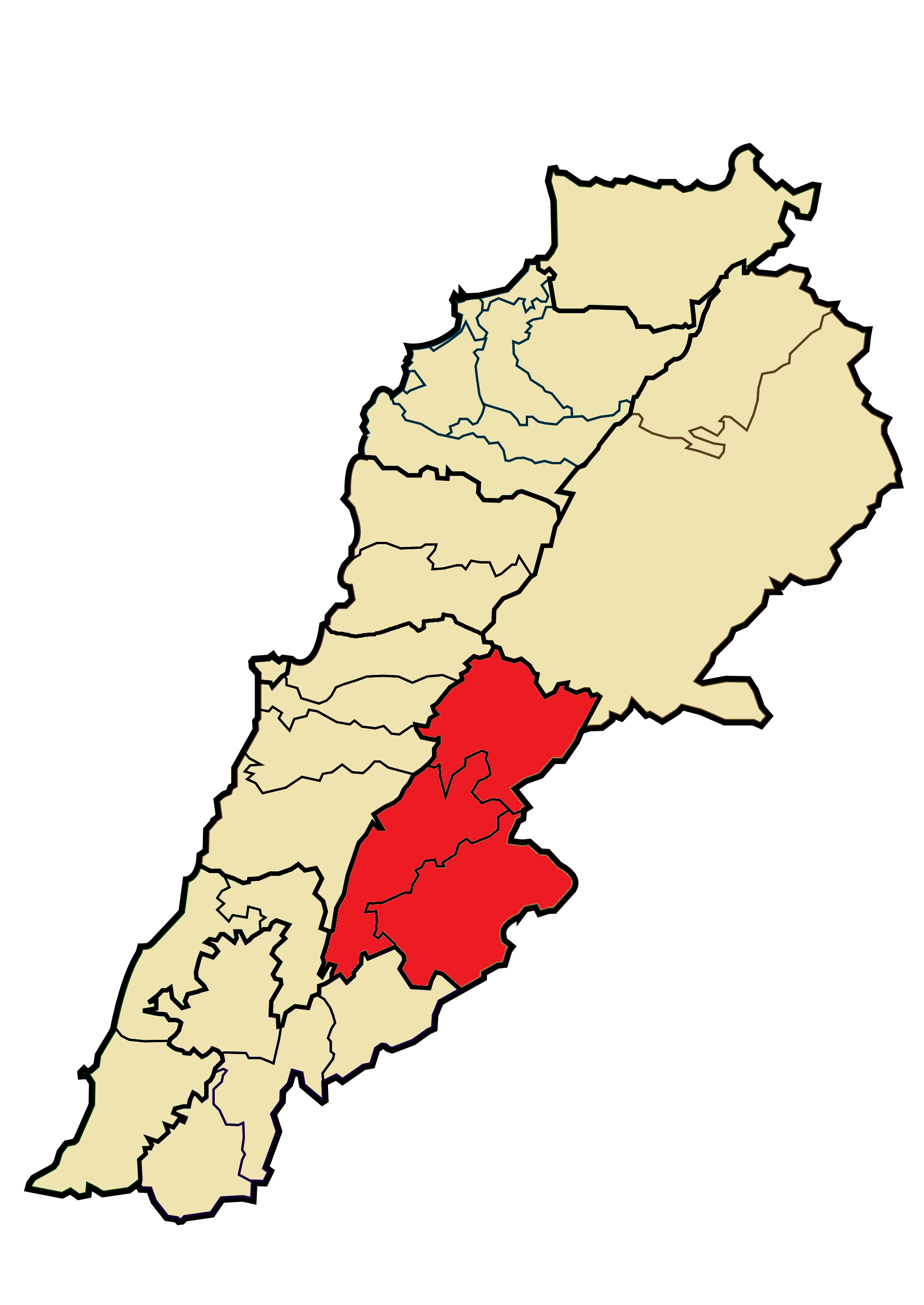
Beqaa Governorate

Since 2014, Beqaa Governorate contains three districts:

- West Beqaa
- Rashaya
- Zahle

A law (Law 522) was passed on 16 July 2003 to separate Baalbek District and Hermel District from Beqaa Governorate to form the new Baalbek-Hermel Governorate. Implementation of Baalbek-Hermel Governorate began in 2014 with the appointment of its first governor.

== Demographics ==
According to registered voters in 2014:

Religion in the Beqaa Governorate
1. Christianity (41.3%)
2. Sunni Islam (36.5%)
3. Shia Islam (15.1%)
4. Druze (6.79%)
5. Other (0.33%)
Religion in the Beqaa Governorate including the Baalbek-Hermel Governorate
1. Shia Islam (43.0%)
2. Sunni Islam (25.5%)
3. Christianity (27.8%)
4. Druze (3.45%)
5. Other (0.37%)

Year	Christians							Muslims				Druze
Year	Total	Greek Catholics	Maronites	Greek Orthodox	Armenian Orthodox	Syriac Orthodox	Other Christians	Total	Sunnis	Shias	Alawites	Druze
2014	41.29%	13.04%	12.74%	8.76%	2.95%	1.74%	2.06%	51.59%	36.52%	15.07%	0.01%	6.79%
