= Cisterns of the Roman Baths, Beirut =

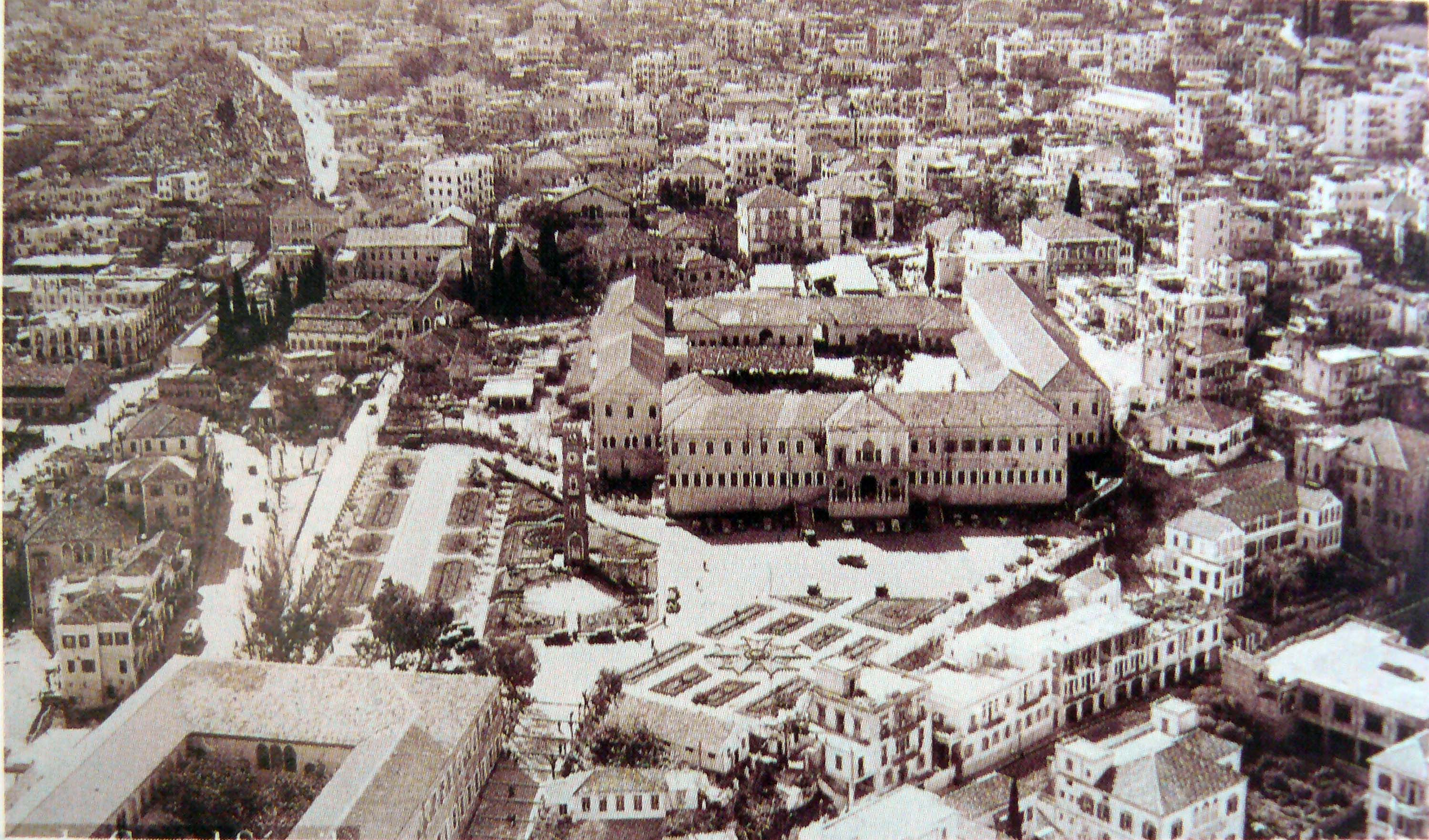
The Cisterns of the Roman Baths were discovered under the gardens facing the Grand Serail building and tower

Cisterns of the Roman Baths are archaeological remains built during Roman times and are located in downtown Beirut, Lebanon. The cisterns were built in order to store and supply water to Roman Berytus.

== Overview ==
The Romans constructed an aqueduct fed by the Beirut River, whose main source was located 10 km (6.2 mi) from the city. When the water reached Riad Al Solh Square, it was stored in large cisterns and then distributed to the pools of the Roman Baths. The cisterns were built in order to store water for a city of nearly 50,000 inhabitants and in the Roman centuries this was a big engineering accomplishment.

== History ==
For centuries, the streams and wells of Ain Naba’, Berjawi and Khandaq Al-Ghamiq provided Beirut with fresh water. At the time of Roman Berytus, four large bath complexes as well as numerous private baths increased the city’s water consumption.

The Romans constructed an aqueduct which crossed the river at Qanater Zbaydeh and followed the slopes of Hazmieh to Mar Mikhael and Furn Al-Chebak. The water finally reached Riad Al Solh Square; there, at the foot of the Serail Hill, it was stored in large cisterns. An intricate network of lead or clay pipes and channels distributed the water to the various pools of the Roman Baths.

The cisterns were damaged and partially destroyed during the big earthquake of 551 AD. Since then they were no more used.

== See also ==
- List of Roman cisterns
- Roman Berytus
- Roman Lebanon
- Riad Al Solh Square
- Serail Hill
- Roman Baths

== Bibliography ==
- Davie, Michael F., Makaroun, Yasmine and Nordiguian, Leon (1997). Les Qanater Zubaydé et l’alimentation en eau de Beyrouth et de ses environs à l’époque romaine, Bulletin d’Archéologie et d’Architecture Libanaises 2:262-289.
- Lauffray, Jean (1977) « Beyrouth. Archéologie et Historie, époques gréco-romaines. I. Période hellénistique et Haut-Empire romain", Aufstieg und Niedergang der Romischen Welt. II.8 : 135-163, Wallter de Gruyter, Berlin.
