= Cardo Decumanus Crossing =

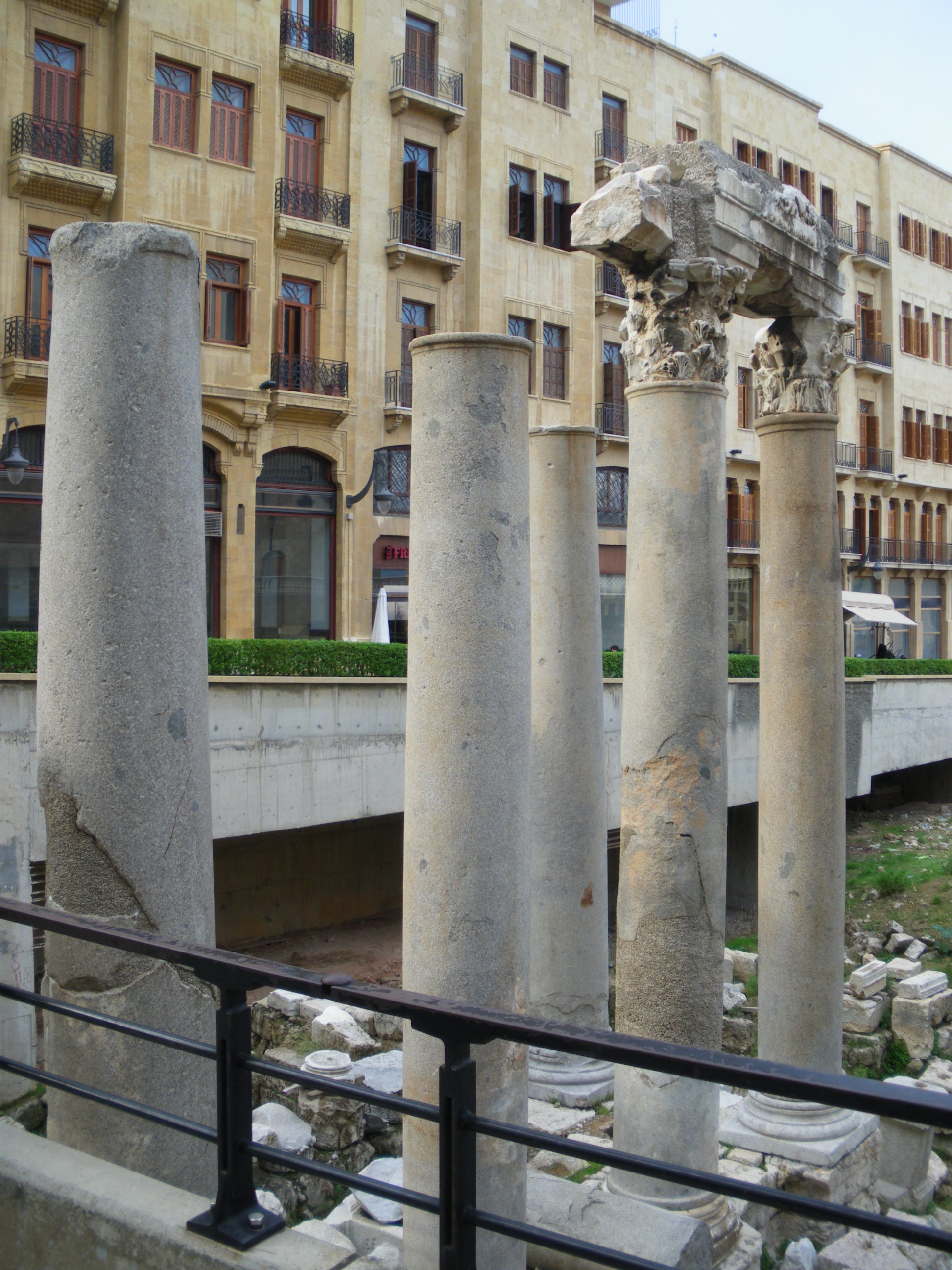
Five re-erected columns mark the crossing of the Cardo and Decumanus Maximus in Beirut

Cardo Decumanus Crossing was in the heart of Roman Berytus (actual Beirut, Lebanon).

== Overview ==
The Cardo and Decumanus Maximus were the main colonnaded streets of Roman Berytus.

Today, five erected columns mark the crossing of the Cardo and the Decumanus Maximus, the two main colonnaded streets of Roman Berytus. The Cardo Maximus connected the Roman Forum to a large complex, extending from the al-Azariyeh building to Riad Al Solh Square. The Decumanus Maximus ran perpendicular to Emir Bashir Street. Salvaged material from these colonnaded streets was used since the Umayyad period to build a new city wall and a water reservoir near the Roman crossing.

The construction of the ring road in 1860 and building projects of the 20th century eliminated most of the ancient features. The new entrance to the Garden of Forgiveness gives access to the original Roman street.

== History ==
The Cardo Maximus connected the Roman Forum to a large complex, that was the center of the old Roman city. The Decumanus Maximus ran parallel to Emir Bashir Street, following the line of the earlier Romano-Hellenistic city wall.

The site of the crossing and the stairway next to it were once known as ‘the stairway of the forty martyrs’, commemorating the story of forty Christians martyred during Roman persecutions. The stairway led from Emir Bashir Street to the pre-war food markets or souks: al-Lahhamin (the meat market), as-Samak (the fish market), al-Bayd (the egg market) and Al-Khodra (the vegetable market).

The construction of the ring road in 1860, connecting the Damascus-Beirut road to the harbor, and later building projects of the 20th century have obliterated most of the ancient features. The new entrance to the Garden of Forgiveness gives access to the original Roman street.

== Timeline ==
- 1860: The construction of the ring road, connecting the Damascus-Beirut road to the harbor, and later building projects of the 20th century have obliterated most of the ancient features.

== See also ==
- Roman Forum, Beirut
- Colonnaded Street
- Roman Berytus
- Riad Al Solh Square
- Garden of Forgiveness

== Bibliography ==
- Saghieh, Muntaha (2005) Urban Planning in a Seaport City, Beirut from Hellenistic to Byzantine Period, in: Morhange, Christophe, Saghieh-Beydoun, Muntaha and Ala'eddine, Abdallah (Eds.) "La Mobilité des Paysages Portuaires Antiques du Liban". Bulletin d’Archéologie et d’Architecture Libanaises, Hors-série II : 147-184.
- Curvers, Hans H. (2013) BEY 148 (lot 1151) Excavations, Bab Derkeh and Decumanus Maximus west. BCC Archeology Project Gray Reports (131014) (https://solidere.academia.edu/hanscurvers)
