= Hermippus (disambiguation) =

Hermippus or Hermippos may refer to one of the following:

- Hermippus (fl. 5th century BC), an Athenian playwright
- Hermippus of Smyrna (fl. 3rd century BC), a philosopher and biographer
- Hermippus of Berytus (fl. 2nd century AD), a grammarian and biographer
- Hermippus (spider), a genus of spiders in the family Zodariidae
