= Colonnaded Street =

Street in Beirut, Lebanon

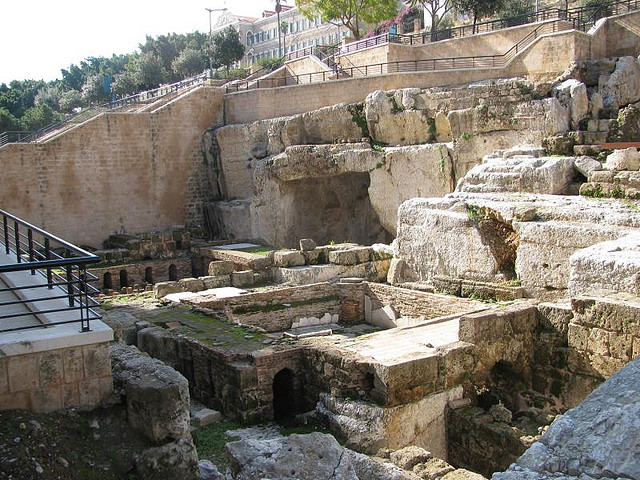
The Roman Baths of Berytus were located near the Colonnaded street

Colonnaded Street is located in downtown Beirut, Lebanon. it was an important street of Roman-era Berytus.

== Overview ==
A commercial street with numbered shops, dating to the Byzantine Empire period, was unearthed during the mid-1990s excavations. In 1996 was made the discovery of 700 sqm of Byzantine mosaics in the Souks area of Beirut, most dating back to the 5th and 6th centuries AD. They were recovered from five large villas and a colonnaded street with its shops. The colonnades had mosaic pavements with Greek letters marking the address of each shop. Most mosaics displayed geometric patterns, although a few incorporated figurative designs.

== Construction ==
Beirut prospered during Roman and Byzantine times, until the earthquake of 551 AD destroyed the Roman city of Berytus. One of its most important streets was brought to light during the archaeological investigations of the souks site in the mid-1990s: a colonnaded shopping street with sidewalks, which connected the center to the Hippodrome of Berytus in Wadi Abu Jamil.

The 400-meter-long Colonnaded street was paved with successive layers of mosaics, displaying various geometric patterns and natural motifs. More than ten shops were discovered during the excavations, each one identified by a Greek letter marked on the mosaic floor.

== History ==
Berytus (Roman Beirut) greatly prospered during Roman and Byzantine times. One of its most important streets was brought to light during the archaeological investigations of the Beirut Souks site in the mid-1990s: a colonnaded shopping street with sidewalks, which connected the center to the Hippodrome or race-track in Wadi Abu Jamil. The 400-meter-long colonnaded street was paved with successive layers of mosaics, displaying various geometric patterns and natural motifs.

More than ten shops of a colonnaded "Portico" were discovered during the excavations, each one identified by a Greek letter (Alpha, Beta, Gamma, Delta…) marked on the mosaic floor. These were written from right to left because the street ran from east to west. A reproduction of the salvaged mosaics, with the Greek letters Beta, Gamma and Delta, is integrated into Souk al-Franj near its original location. The mosaic panel is in alignment with the ancient colonnaded street.

It is likely however, that the Portico discovered on the Souks excavation was colonnaded. The road surface excavated in December 1995 seems to end along the Souk Tawileh line where it turns at an angle of 100 degrees to the north. The Souks excavations clearly demonstrate that no colonnaded street continued to the east along the line of that excavated to the west.

A group of five columns found on the left of the Maronite Cathedral of Saint George, were once part of a grand colonnade of Berytus: they were found in 1963.

== Timeline ==
- 551 AD: Destruction of Beirut by earthquake.
- Mid-1990: Discovery of a colonnaded shopping street with sidewalks.

== See also ==
- Byzantine mosaics
- Mosaics
- Cisterns of the Roman Baths, Beirut
- Roman Baths, Beirut

== Bibliography ==
- Perring, Dominic (1997-1998) "Excavations in the Souks of Beirut: An introduction of the work of the British Lebanese team and summary report", Berytus, vol. 43: 9-34
- Seeden, Helga et al. (1995). Urban archaeology 1994: Excavations of the Souks Area- Beirut, Solidere, Beirut.
