= Carlton Hotel, Beirut =

Hotel in Beirut, Lebanon

The Carlton Beirut
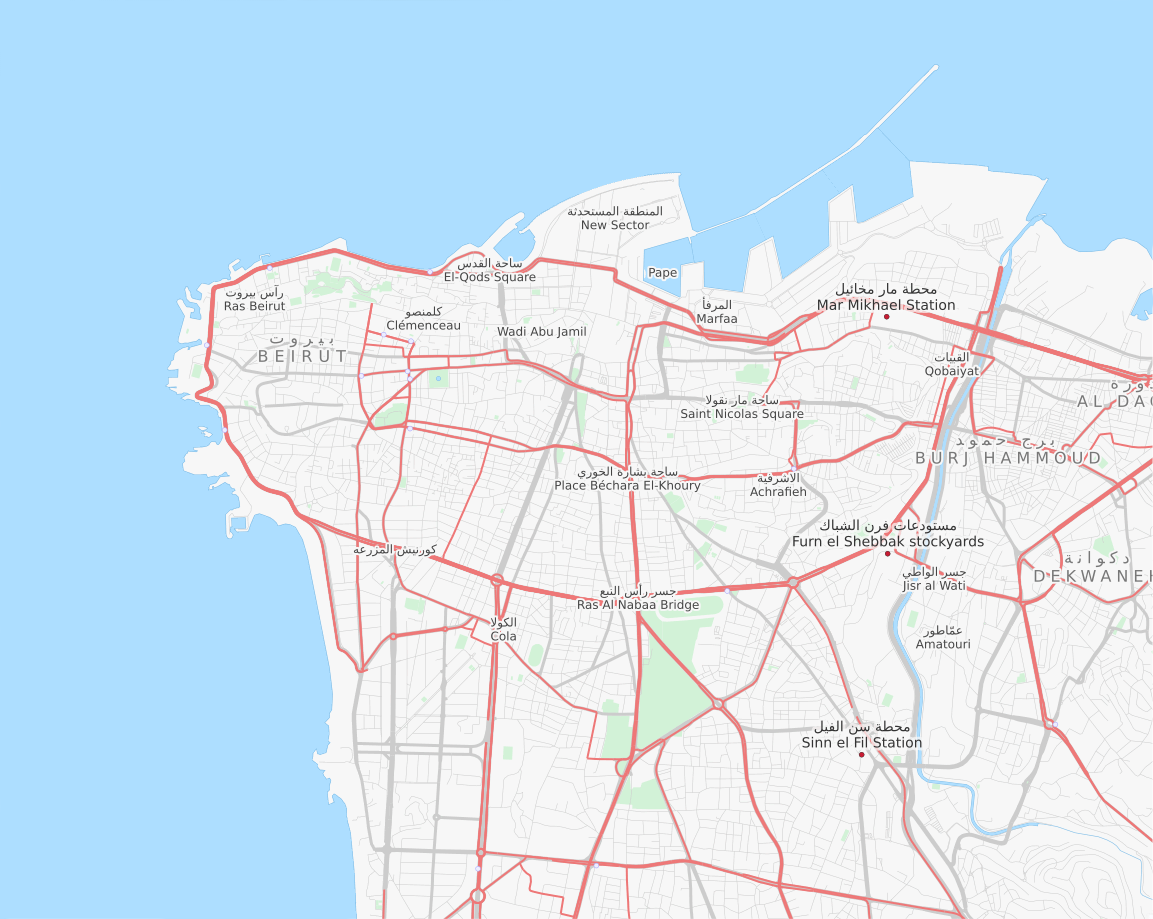
- Location within Beirut

General information
- Location: Beirut, Lebanon
- Coordinates: 33.88582942676991°N 35.47603595677442°E
- Opening: 1955

The Carlton Hotel was a luxury hotel in Beirut, Lebanon.

The Carlton was built in 1955 on Avenue General de Gaulle, the southern part of the Corniche Beirut, offering 140 rooms with uninterrupted view to the Mediterranean, but it was demolished in 2008, causing a lot of criticism and triggering a renewed consciousness about the need to preserve modern heritage.

The Carlton Hotel was designed by Karol Schayer, a Polish architect who came to Beirut during the Second World War and Lebanese architects Makdisi, Shayer, and Adib. It quickly attracted a cosmopolitan clientele, and its swimming pool and gardens overlooking the Corniche compensated from its distance from the shoreline.

The hotel was not only a popular tourist resort and one of the symbols of the hedonistic pre-war years, but it was also a popular destination for the LGBTQ community in Beirut.

During the Lebanese Civil War, Riad Taha, who was the president of the Syndicate of Publishers Union and at the time, trying to forge an anti-PLO front in Beirut, was murdered by the PLO outside the hotel.

Because it was not looted like the Parliament, the St. Georges, or the Phoenicia were, or burnt like the Grand Serail was, the Carlton was chosen as the venue for the presidential election when on May 8, 1976, Élias Sarkis became president.

== Films set at the Carlton ==
- Ankhen (1968 film)
