= Karol Schayer =

Polish architect (1900–1971)

- Born: December 25, 1900; Lwów, Galicia (Central Europe), Austria-Hungary
- Died: March 15, 1971 (aged 70); Rockford, Illinois, United States
- Occupation: Architect

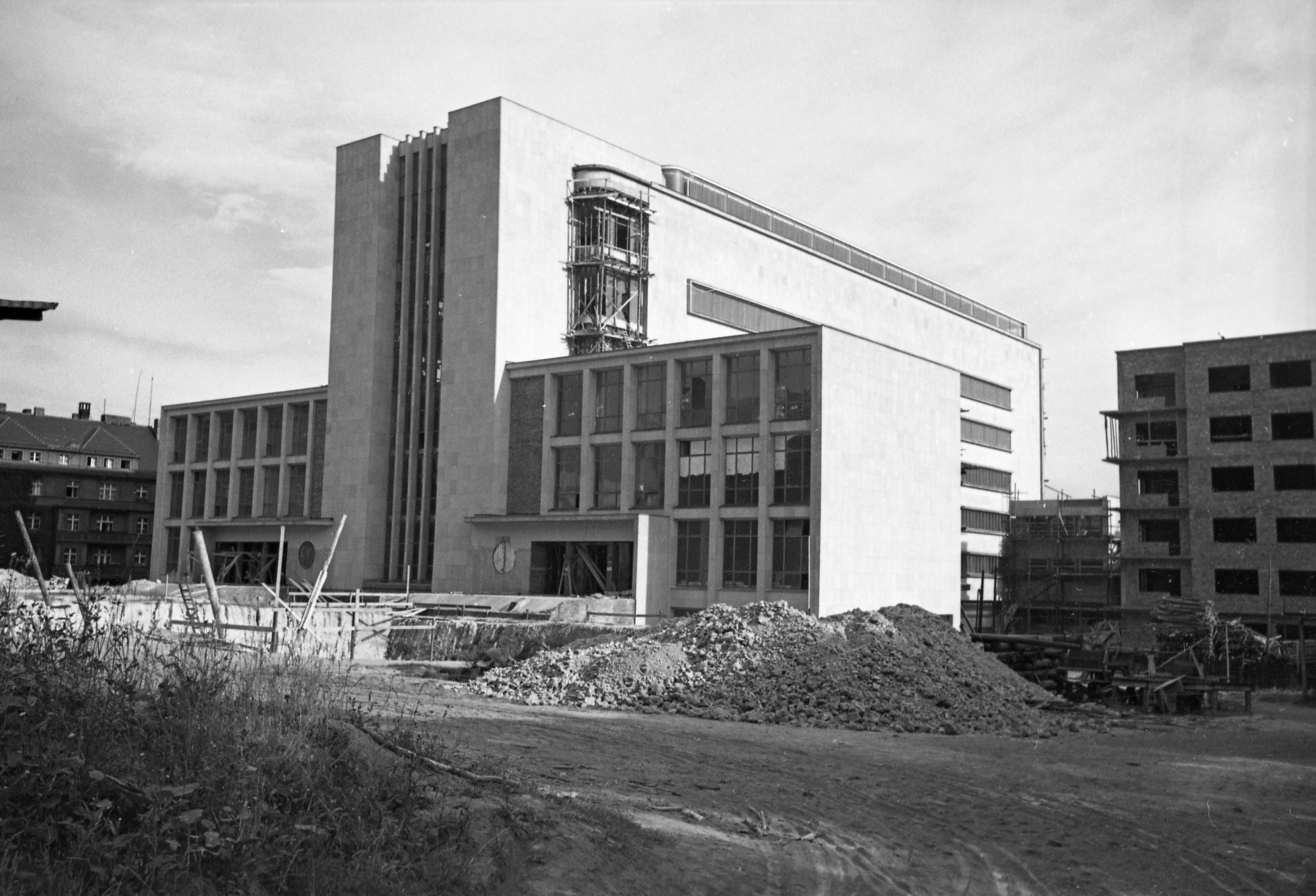
Katowice, Silesian Museum (1939)

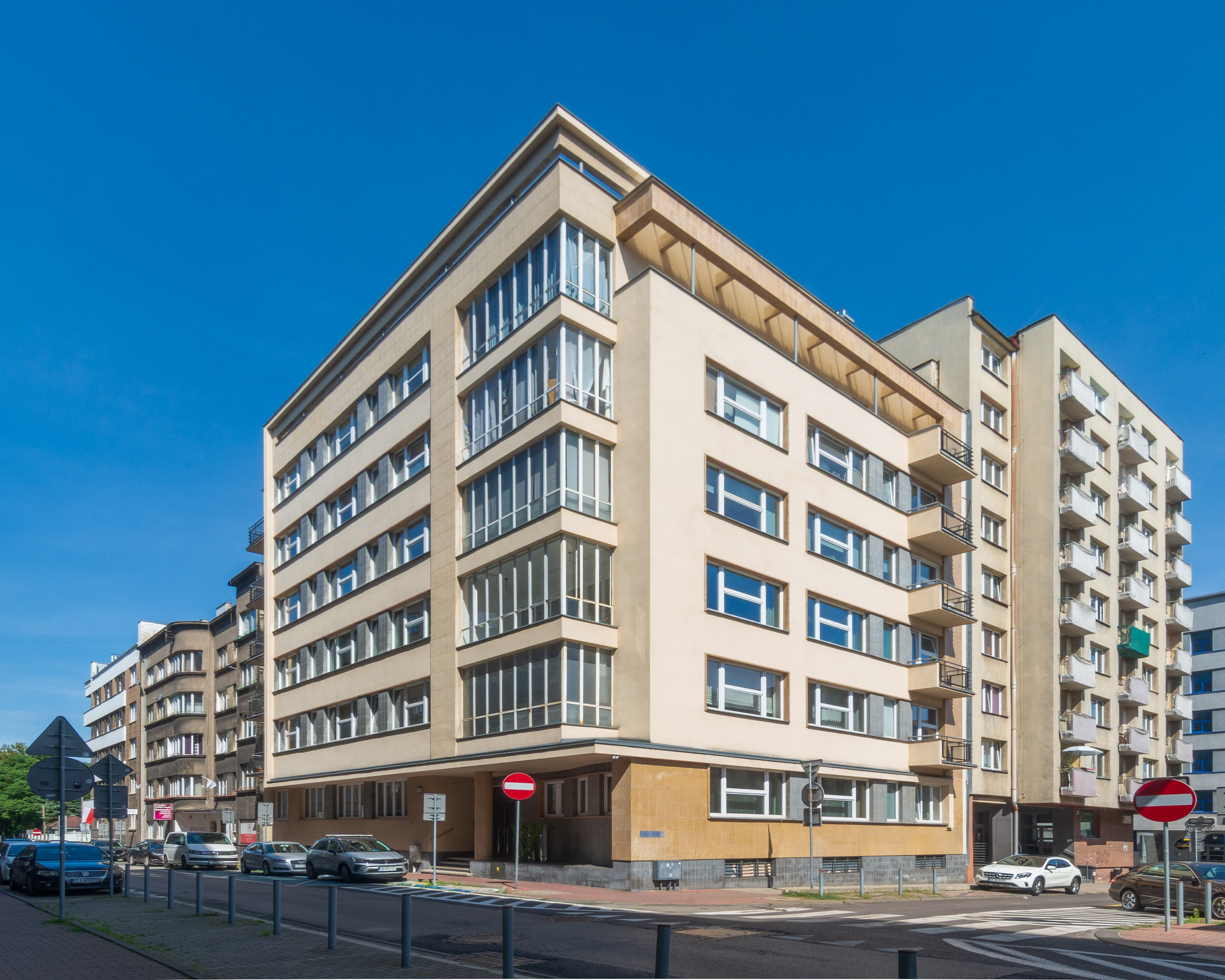
Katowice, PCK 6 street

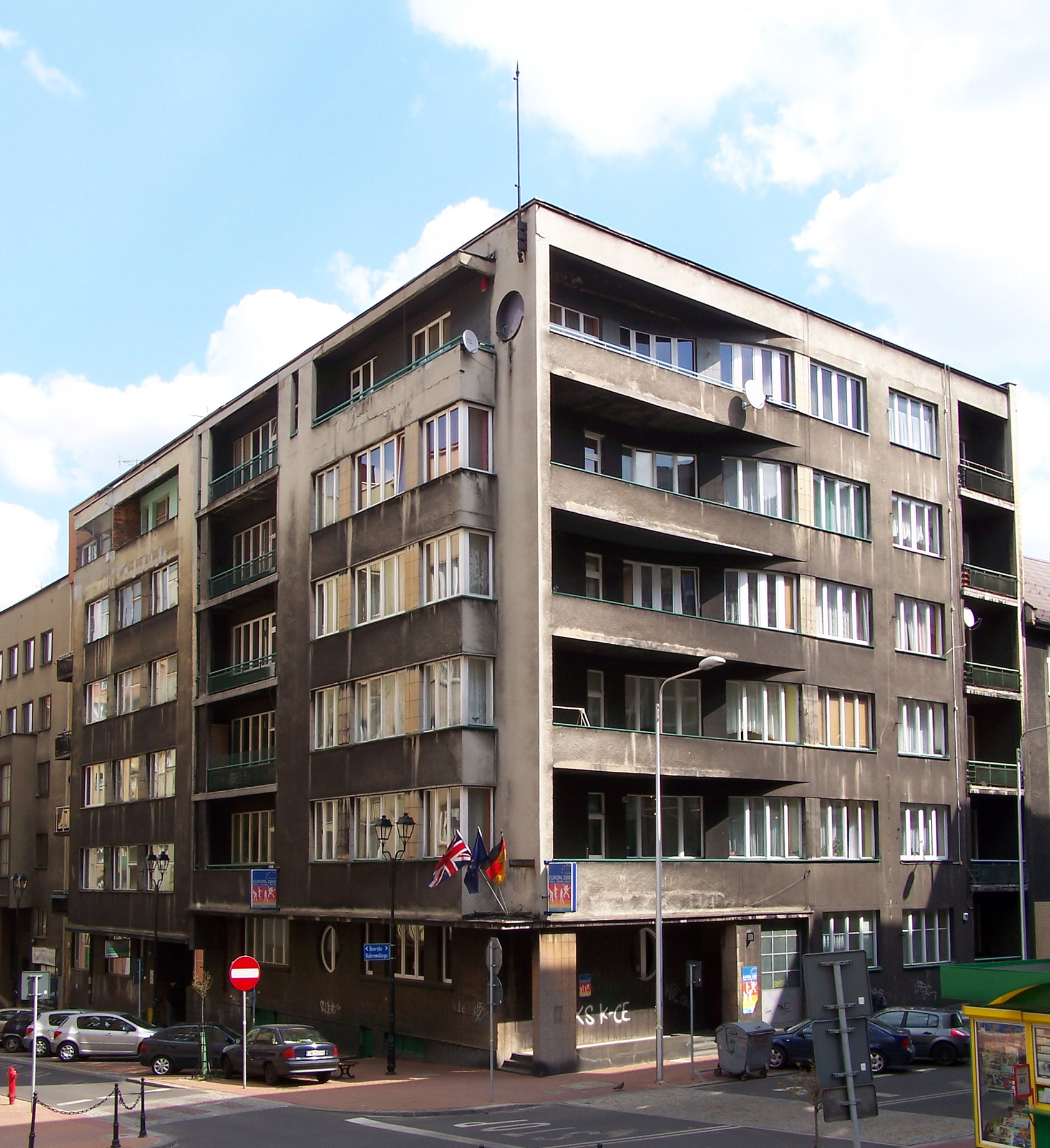
Katowice, Reymonta street (1930)

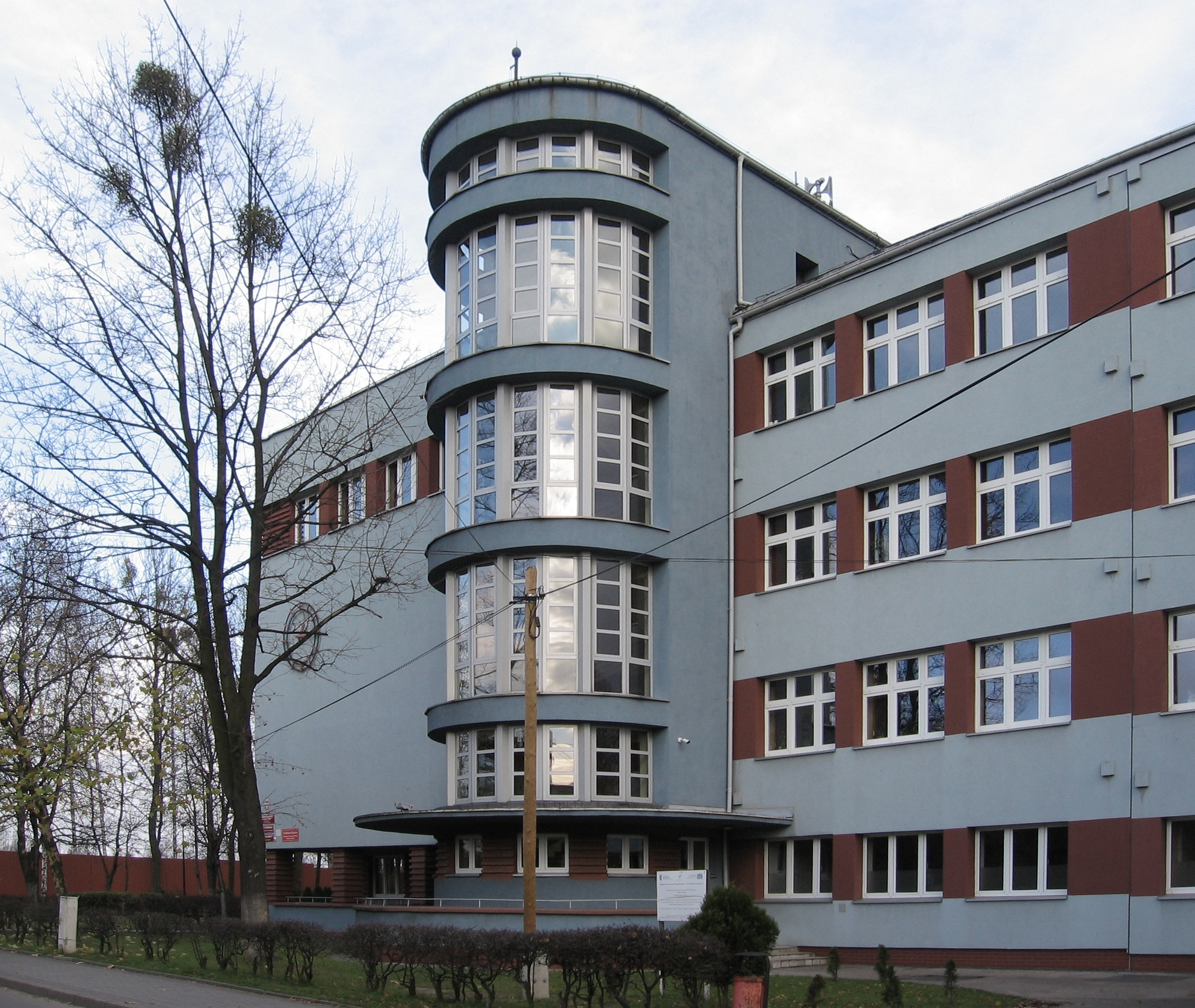
Piekary Śląskie Szarlej, School building

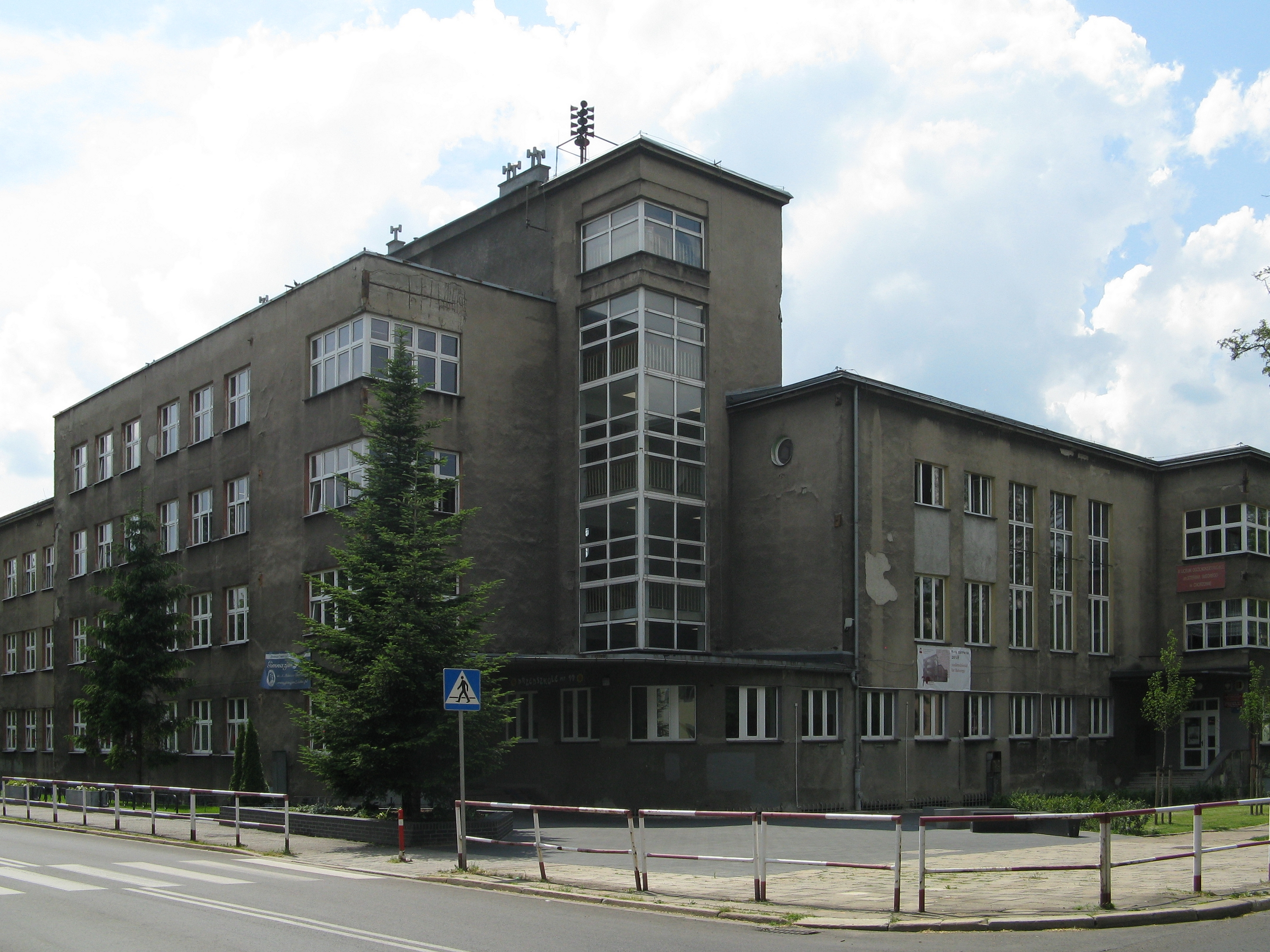
Chorzów, school building (1932)

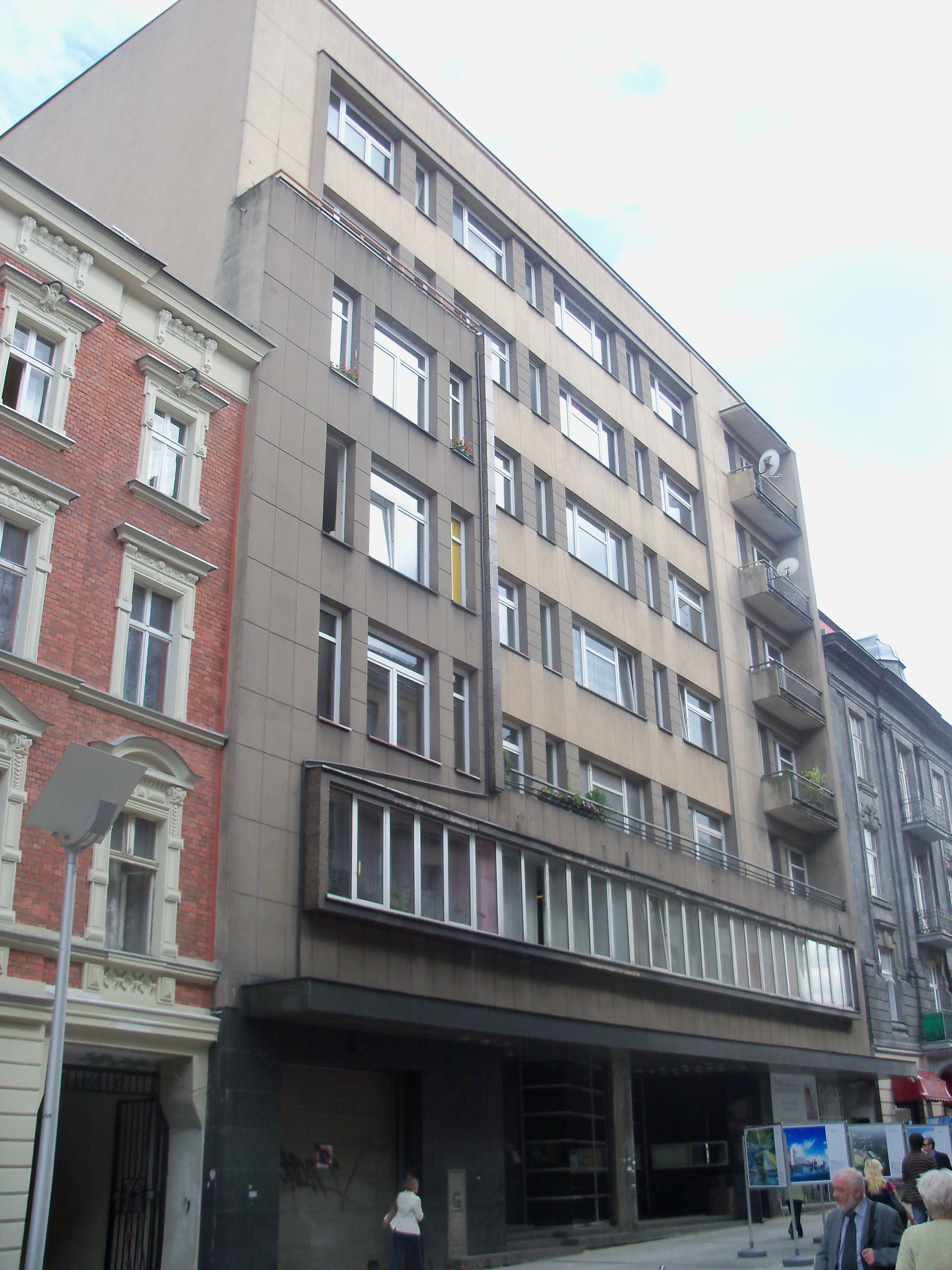
Katowice, Bank, Mielęckiego 10 street (1938)

Karol Schayer (25 December 1900 in Lwów – 15 March 1971 in Rockford, Illinois) was a Polish architect and soldier. He designed buildings in Katowice, Warsaw, and (during and after World War II) in Beirut, Lebanon.

He was the son of Julian, a merchant in Lwów. In 1919, he passed his final exams at the Lwów gymnasium. He fought on the side of the Polish insurgents during the fights with the Ukrainian troops that occupied Lwów. After completing his military service, he began studying at the Faculty of Architecture of the Technical University in Lwów. He soon interrupted his studies to take part in the plebiscite campaign in Spisz and Orawa. In 1920, as a volunteer, he took part in the Polish-Bolshevik war. In 1921, he interrupted his studies again to help organize an Upper Silesia plebiscite. In 1922, he returned to his studies while working in companies and architectural bureaus. In March 1926, he received a degree in architectural engineering.

In 1929, he married Bożena Sołtysówna, the daughter of Joachim Sołtys, a Polish national activist from Bytom. From this marriage he had a daughter, Krystyna.

Activity before 1 September 1939

From December 1927, he worked as a clerk in the Department of Communications and Public Works of the Silesian Voivodship Office in Katowice, designing, among others, in many school buildings, in 1933 he became an expert for architectural and construction matters at the District Court in Katowice. In 1934, at the behest of the voivode, Michał Grażyński, he organized an office whose aim was to develop a project and then implement the building of the Silesian Museum in Katowice. From 1935, together with Henryk Griffel, he ran an architectural office in Katowice, realizing house designs in Katowice, Chorzów, Kraków and Warsaw. He also designed in Bielsko and Cieszyn.

His greatest work built before the war was the building of the Silesian Museum in Katowice, which was demolished by the Germans in 1941-1944 as a manifestation of "degenerate art".

The years of World War II

In 1939, being a member of the civilian defense of the Polish eastern area of Upper Silesia, he led the activities of volunteers from independence organizations during security works. Then, after the German attack on September 1, 1939, he organized evacuation activities into the interior of the country. Forced to flee abroad from the Germans, he reached Romania, then Istanbul, and in December 1940 Palestine, where he worked with Polish military units. In the years 1942-1944 he stayed in Eritrea working for the allied forces in the military design office. From 1944 he stayed in Jaffa, where he gave lectures to soldiers.

Activities after 1945

In 1946, he moved to Beirut, Lebanon, where he ran a design studio with Wasik Adib, with whom he designed many modernist buildings in Beirut, Tripoli and Saida in the 1950s and 1960s. In Lebanon during World War II he collaborated with Fritz Gothelf, a German architect educated in the spirit of the Bauhaus, and Bahij Makdissi, a Lebanese structural engineer. He was also a lecturer at the Lebanese Institute of Painting and Graphic Arts in Beirut. In 1970 he was forced to leave for the United States where he died in 1971 in Rockford (Illinois).

In accordance with his last will, he was buried at the Polish cemetery in Beirut.

== Major buildings and projects ==
- 1929 - school, Lubliniec
- 1930 - apartment building on Dąbrowskiego 24 / W. Reymonta 6, Katowice
- 1932 - school on Farna street in Chorzów (with Antoni Olszewski)
- 1936-39 - Muzeum Śląskie building, Chrobrego square (demolished in 1941)
- 1936 - Żytomierski House, PCK street, Katowice
- 1936 - Międzynarodowy Bank Handlowy, Mielęckiego street, Katowice
- 1936-37 - Kędzior House, Korfantego street, Katowice
- 1937 - Radowski House, Korfantego street, Katowice
- 1937 - Chmielewski House, Frascati 4 street, Warsaw
- 1952 - AUB Alumni Club building, Beirut (1952)
- 1954 - Dar Al Sayad, Beirut (1954)
- 1955 - Hotel Carlton, Raouche, Beirut (demolished)
- 1958 - Horeshoe Building, Hamra street, Beirut
- 1959 - Shell Building, Beirut
- 1959 - Carlton Hotel, Beirut

== See also ==
- Architecture of Lebanon

=== Bibliography ===
- Arbid, George (2012), Karol Schayer, Architect (1900 - 1971): A Pole in Beirut, Basel, Birkhauser Verlag, ISBN 978-3-03-460772-8
