= Roman Baths, Beirut =

Roman Baths
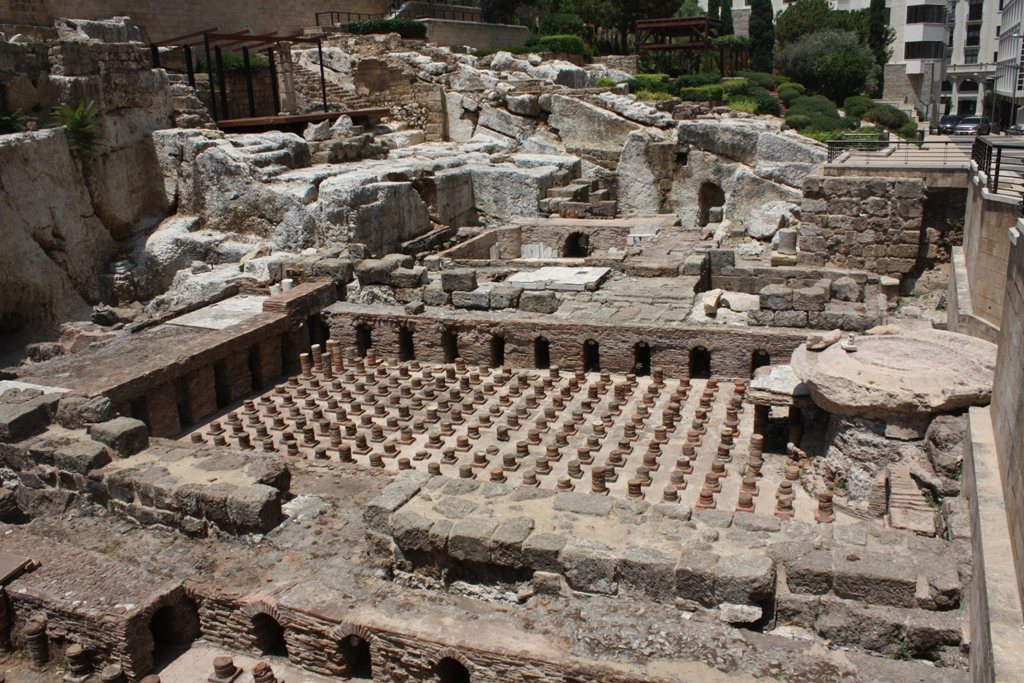
- Ruins of the Roman Baths of Berytus

- Location within Lebanon
- 33.8969°N 35.5026°E
- Location: downtown Beirut, Lebanon

Site notes
- Architectural style: ancient Roman

The Roman Berytus (Roman Baths) are located in the middle of downtown Beirut, Lebanon between Banks Street and Capuchin Street. The remains of a Roman bath of Berytus now surrounded by government buildings were found and conserved for posterity.

== Overview ==
The Roman Baths is an ancient Roman thermae or bath site inside the Roman city of Berytus. It was discovered in 1968–1969 and underwent major renovation in the mid-1990s.

The archaeological ruin of one of the baths has been preserved and is occasionally used as a performance space, thus reflecting the ancient traditions of the site. One of the baths is used as an artistic performance and concert space. The modern site is also home to Mediterranean-style gardens that contain a variety of medicinal plants once used in bathing balms.

The Roman bathhouse was a meeting place for all citizens. It had four major bath chambers. The bather moved from warm to hot baths, through rooms of varying temperatures. Located under the floor, the heating system (hypocaust) allowed the air, warmed by wood fires in adjacent vaults, to circulate between pillars of terracotta disks that heated the marble floor; terracotta pipes in the walls allowed the air to rise up to the ceiling. Water from the boiler fed the marble-tiled pools in the hot room (caldarium), and a large stone basin (labrum) contained cool water for the bathers’ use. The bathing routine ended with a body massage of therapeutic oils. The high vaulted, spacious halls of the bathhouse also accommodated performances of jesters and musicians.

== History ==
The Berytus Baths were discovered in 1968, then underwent major renovation in the mid-1990s. Roman Berytus had four major bath complexes (thermae) and the first was created in the early first century under Augustus. The terrible Berytus earthquake of 551 AD destroyed all the baths.

Today, one of the baths is used as an artistic performance and concert space. The modern site is also home to Mediterranean-style gardens that contain a variety of medicinal plants once used in bathing balms.

Actually the gardens of these "Baths" are located inside the famous Garden of Forgiveness of modern Beirut.

== See also ==
- List of Roman public baths
- Serail Hill
- Roman baths (Amman)

== Bibliography ==
- Mouterde, René et Lauffray, Jean (1952) Beyrouth ville romaine, Publications de la Direction des Antiquités du Liban, Beyrouth.
- Lauffray, Jean (1977) « Beyrouth. Archéologie et Historie, époques gréco-romaines. I. Période hellénistique et Haut-Empire romain", Aufstieg und Niedergang der Romischen Welt. II.8 : 135-163, Wallter de Gruyter, Berlin.
- Beirut.com
