= Hermippus cruciatus =

Scientific classification
- Kingdom: Animalia
- Phylum: Arthropoda
- Subphylum: Chelicerata
- Class: Arachnida
- Order: Araneae
- Infraorder: Araneomorphae
- Family: Zodariidae
- Genus: Hermippus
- Species: H. cruciatus

Binomial name
- Hermippus cruciatus Simon, 1905

Species of spider

Hermippus cruciatus, is a species of spider of the genus Hermippus. It is native to India and Sri Lanka.
