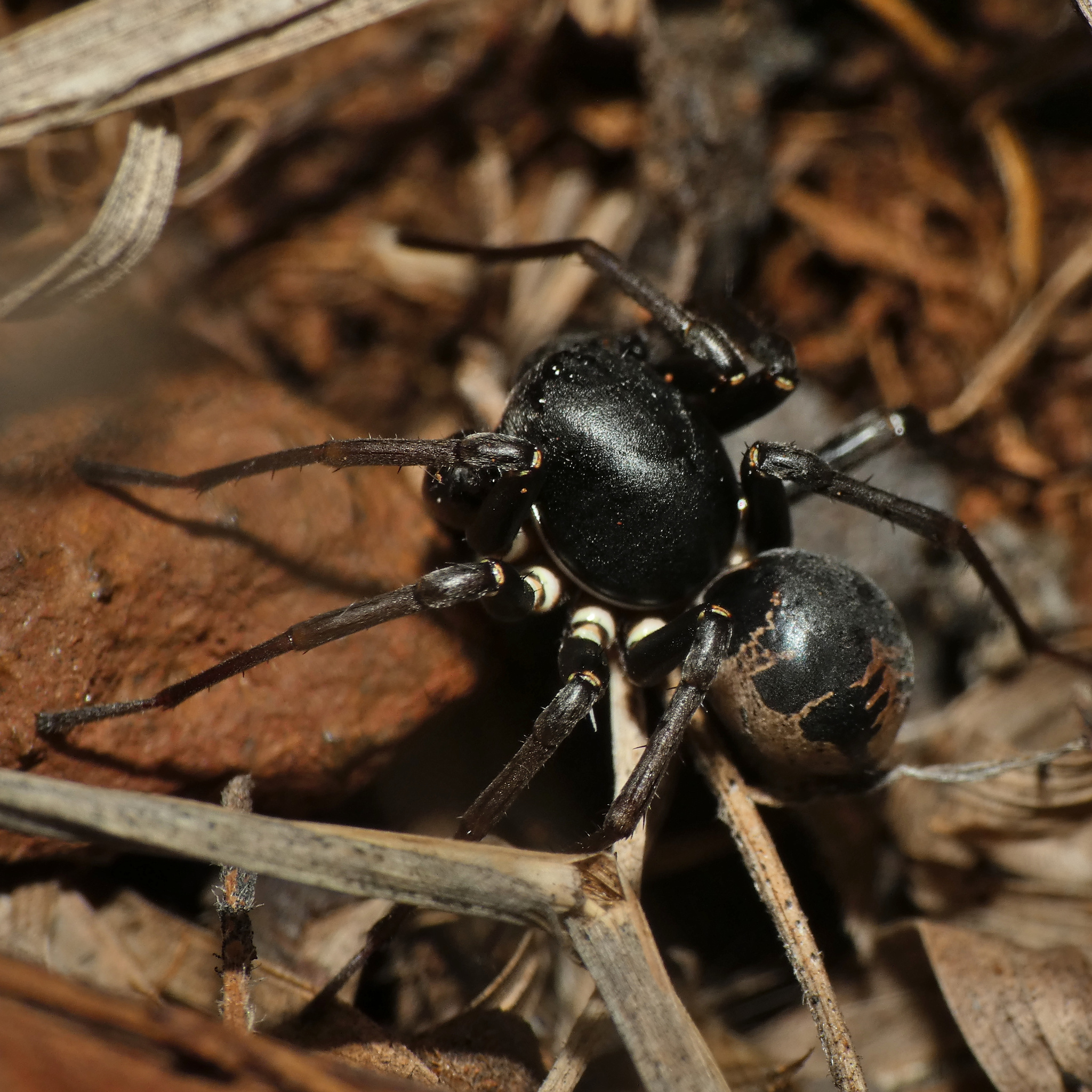

Scientific classification
- Kingdom: Animalia
- Phylum: Arthropoda
- Subphylum: Chelicerata
- Class: Arachnida
- Order: Araneae
- Infraorder: Araneomorphae
- Family: Zodariidae
- Genus: Hermippus
- Species: H. tenebrosus

Binomial name
- Hermippus tenebrosus Jocqué, 1986

= Hermippus tenebrosus =

Krugerpark Hermippus Zodariid spider

Species of spider

Hermippus tenebrosus is a species of spider in the family Zodariidae. It is endemic to South Africa and is commonly known as the Krugerpark Hermippus Zodariid spider.

== Distribution ==
Hermippus tenebrosus is found in the Limpopo and KwaZulu-Natal provinces of South Africa. Records include Kruger National Park and Tembe Elephant Park.

== Habitat ==
The species is a free-living ground dweller that inhabits the Savanna biome at altitudes ranging from 91 to 418 metres above sea level. It has been collected using pitfall traps.

== Description ==
Hermippus tenebrosus can be distinguished from other Zodariidae by having only two tarsal claws instead of the usual three. It is known only from males. Males have a total length of 8.7 mm. The carapace and chelicerae are chestnut brown, while the sternum is dark reddish brown. The femora of the legs are dark brown with white distal dorsal margins, with the remainder of the legs being paler brown. The opisthosoma is sepia with a dark-brown scutum that has a pale reddish-brown frontal margin and distinctive white spot patterns.

== Conservation ==
The species is listed as Data Deficient due to taxonomic reasons. Although rare, it is protected in Kruger National Park and Tembe Elephant Park. More sampling is needed to collect female specimens and determine the species' full range.
