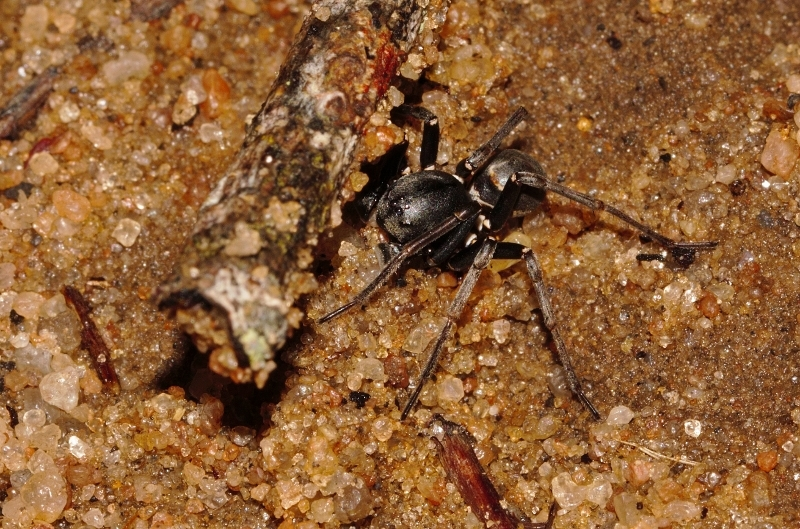

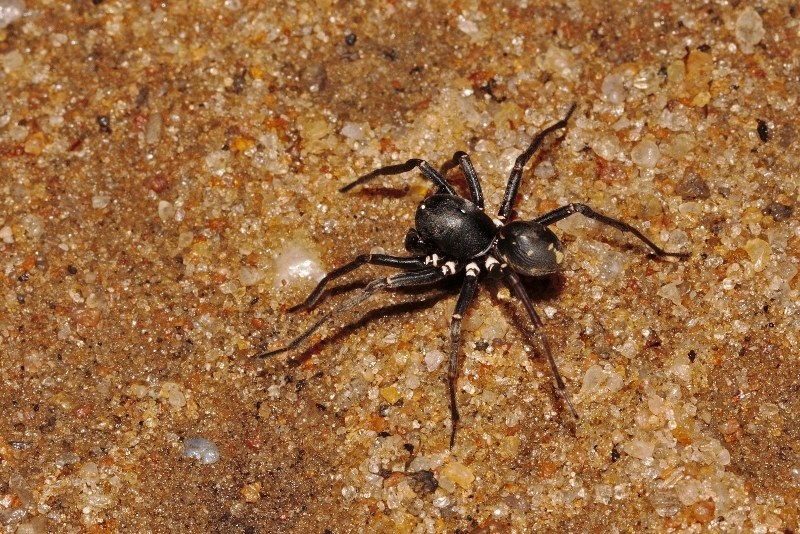

Scientific classification
- Kingdom: Animalia
- Phylum: Arthropoda
- Subphylum: Chelicerata
- Class: Arachnida
- Order: Araneae
- Infraorder: Araneomorphae
- Family: Zodariidae
- Genus: Hermippus
- Species: H. loricatus

Binomial name
- Hermippus loricatus Simon, 1893

= Hermippus loricatus =

Tanzania Hermippus Zodariid spider

Species of spider

Hermippus loricatus is a species of spider in the family Zodariidae. It is the type species of the genus Hermippus and is commonly known as the Tanzania Hermippus Zodariid spider.

== Distribution ==
Hermippus loricatus has a wide distribution across eastern and southern Africa, including the Democratic Republic of the Congo, Malawi, Mozambique, Tanzania, Zambia, and South Africa. The only South African record is from a museum specimen labeled "Ost-Transvaal."

== Habitat ==
Hermippus loricatus is a free-running ground dweller that appears to be limited to miombo woodland, a vegetation type with a vast distribution in the southern half of Africa south of the equator.

== Description ==
Hermippus loricatus can be distinguished from other Zodariidae by having only two tarsal claws instead of the usual three. Males have a total length of 8.7 mm. The carapace is dark-reddish to blackish brown, with orange to chestnut brown legs that have creamy white distal margins on the dorsal side of trochanters and coxae. The chelicerae are chestnut brown and the sternum is orange to reddish brown.

The opisthosoma is black with white markings, featuring a chestnut brown scutum covering the anterior dorsum with an orange-red mark of variable shape, most often resembling an inverted mushroom.

== Conservation ==
The species is listed as Least Concern by the South African National Biodiversity Institute due to its wide African range. However, more sampling is needed in South Africa to confirm the species' presence and determine its range within the country.
