= Hermippus septemguttatus =

Zululand Hermippus Zodariid spider

Conservation status
- Least Concern (SANBI Red List)

Scientific classification
- Kingdom: Animalia
- Phylum: Arthropoda
- Subphylum: Chelicerata
- Class: Arachnida
- Order: Araneae
- Infraorder: Araneomorphae
- Family: Zodariidae
- Genus: Hermippus
- Species: H. septemguttatus

Binomial name
- Hermippus septemguttatus Lawrence, 1942

Species of spider

Hermippus septemguttatus is a species of spider in the family Zodariidae. It is found in South Africa and Mozambique and is commonly known as the Zululand Hermippus Zodariid spider.

== Distribution ==
Hermippus septemguttatus occurs in southern Africa, with records from KwaZulu-Natal province in South Africa and Mozambique. South African localities include iSimangaliso Wetland Park, Kosi Bay Nature Reserve, Mkuzi Game Reserve, and Cape Vidal.

== Habitat ==
The species has a strictly coastal distribution, occurring only in forests along the sea, including mangroves. It inhabits the Indian Ocean Coastal Belt and Savanna biomes at altitudes ranging from 5 to 54 metres above sea level.

== Description ==
Hermippus septemguttatus can be distinguished from other Zodariidae by having only two tarsal claws instead of the usual three. Both sexes display a characteristic dark dorsum of the opisthosoma with seven pale spots arranged in a particular pattern. Females have a total length of 9.4 mm while males measure 6.64 mm. The carapace is reddish brown with a paler area around the eyes. Female legs are yellow, while chelicerae are dark brown to reddish brown. The sternum is orange, and the opisthosoma is uniform grey with seven faint pale dorsal spots.

== Conservation ==
The species is listed as Least Concern by the South African National Biodiversity Institute due to its wide range in southern Africa. It is protected in Kosi Bay Nature Reserve and Mkuze Game Reserve. More sampling is needed to determine the species' full range.
