= Garden of Forgiveness =

2013 VOA report about the Garden of Forgiveness

The Garden of Forgiveness (also known as Hadiqat As-Samah in Arabic) is a garden in Beirut, Lebanon, close to Martyrs' Square and the wartime Green Line (1975–1990).

== History ==
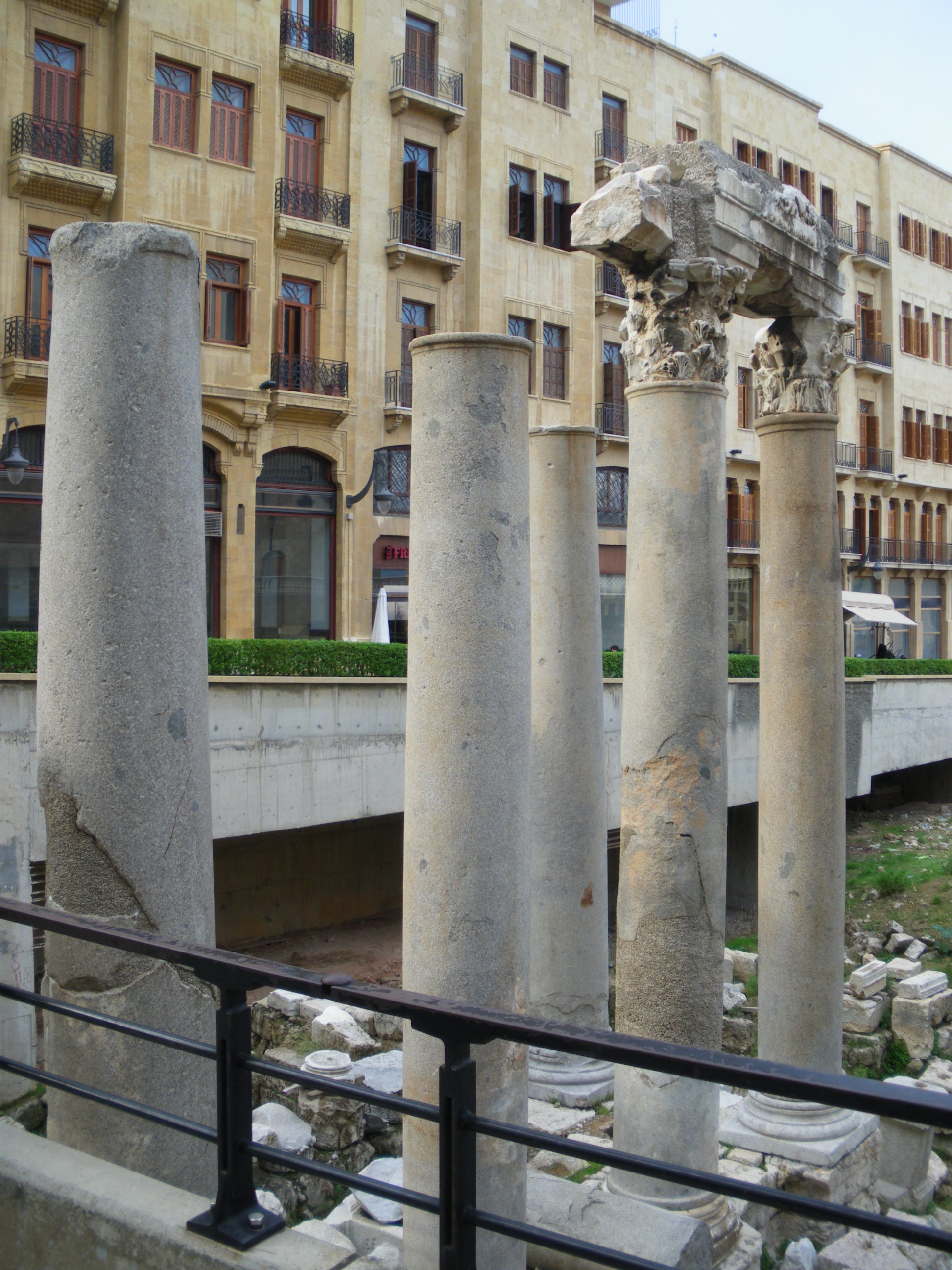
Roman columns at the Garden of Forgiveness

The area is classified as non ædificandi (Latin for "not to be built") in the Master Plan of the Beirut City Center. Excavations on the site revealed the two main streets of the Roman city of Berytus, the Cardo and Decumanus Maximus; underneath them, a sacred platform dating from Phoenico-Persian times.

== See also ==
- Place de l'Étoile
