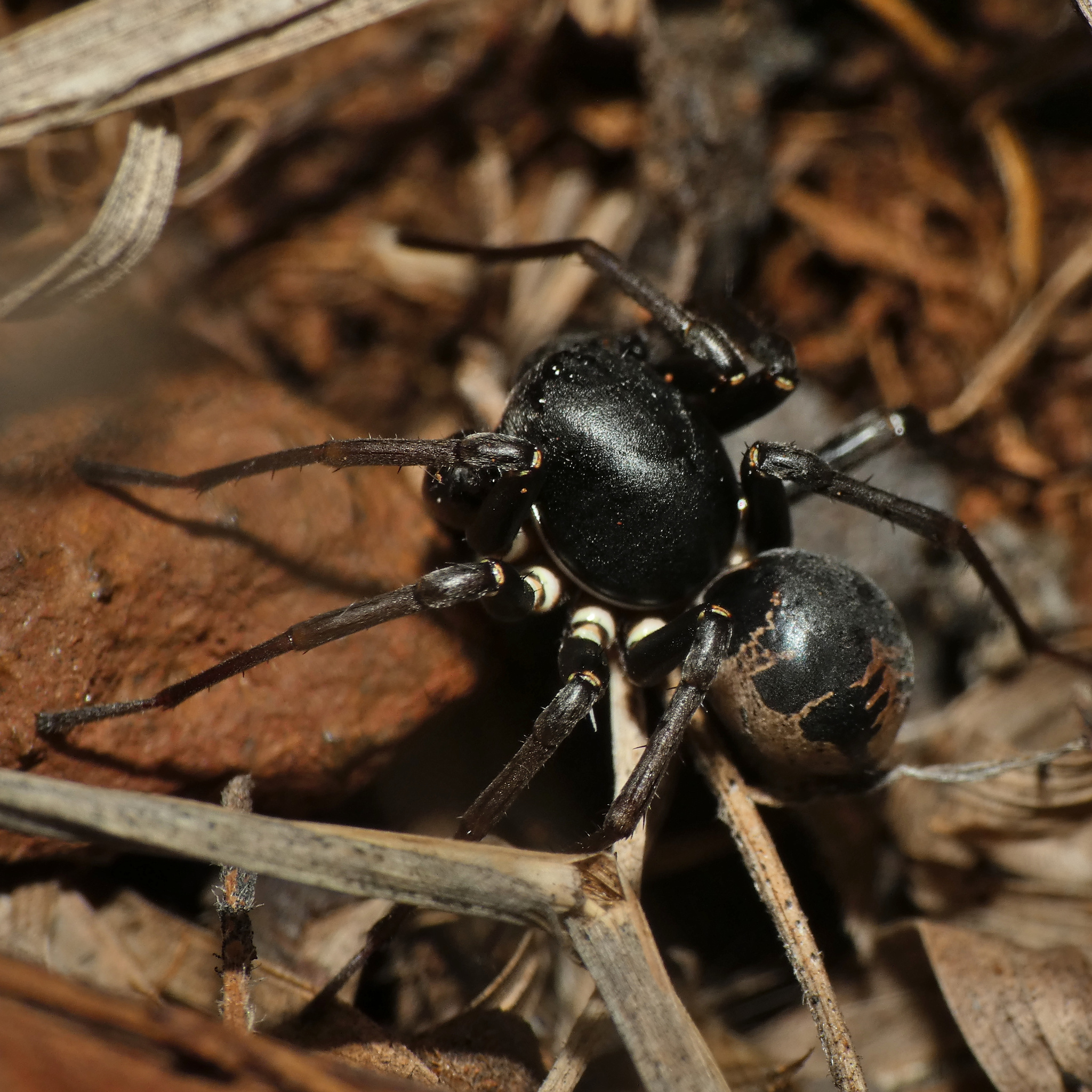
- H. tenebrosus
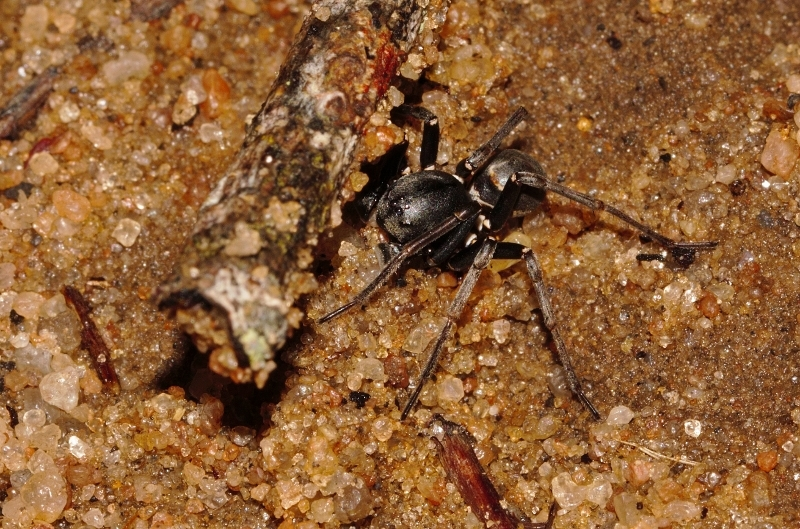
- H. loricatus

Scientific classification
- Kingdom: Animalia
- Phylum: Arthropoda
- Subphylum: Chelicerata
- Class: Arachnida
- Order: Araneae
- Infraorder: Araneomorphae
- Family: Zodariidae
- Genus: Hermippus; Simon, 1893

Type species
- Hermippus loricatus Simon, 1893

Species
- See text

Diversity
- 13 species

= Hermippus (spider) =

Genus of spiders

Hermippus is a genus of ant eating spiders in the family Zodariidae, containing thirteen species restricted to Asia and parts of Africa. Three new species were discovered in 2014.

== Species ==
As of September 2025, this genus includes thirteen species:

- Hermippus affinis Strand, 1906 – Ethiopia, Somalia
- Hermippus arcus Jocqué, 1989 – Tanzania
- Hermippus arjuna (Gravely, 1921) – India
- Hermippus cruciatus Simon, 1905 – India, Sri Lanka
- Hermippus gavi Sankaran, Jobi, Joseph & Sebastian, 2014 – India
- Hermippus globosus Sankaran, Jobi, Joseph & Sebastian, 2014 – India
- Hermippus inflexus Sankaran, Jobi, Joseph & Sebastian, 2014 – India
- Hermippus loricatus Simon, 1893 – DR Congo, Malawi, Mozambique, Tanzania, Zambia, South Africa (type species)
- Hermippus minutus Jocqué, 1986 – Zimbabwe
- Hermippus schoutedeni Lessert, 1938 – Kenya
- Hermippus septemguttatus Lawrence, 1942 – Mozambique, South Africa
- Hermippus tenebrosus Jocqué, 1986 – South Africa
- Hermippus valentinus Logghe & Jocqué, 2023 – Tanzania
