= Hermippus of Berytus =

Hermippus of Berytus, also known as Hermippus Berytius or Hermippus the Berytian (Greek: Ἕρμιππος ὁ Βηρύτιος; fl. 2nd century AD) was a Greek grammarian from Berytus (modern-day Beirut) who flourished under Trajan and Hadrian. By birth he was a slave, but having become the disciple of Philo of Byblos, he was recommended by him to Herennius Severus, and attained to great eminence by his eloquence and learning. He wrote many works, among which were an account of dreams in five books, and a book Περὶ Ἑβδομάδος. He wrote a work on famous slaves, which included Parthenius of Nicaea. He is also quoted by Clement of Alexandria, and by Stephanus of Byzantium.
