= Grand Serail of Beirut =

The Grand Serail
- السراي الكبير
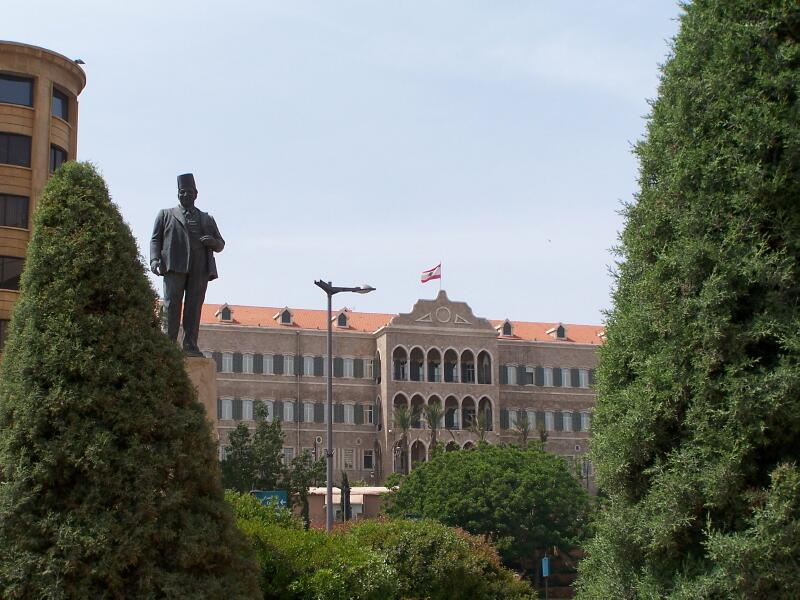
- The Serail Hill overlooking the Beirut central district

- Location within Beirut Location within Lebanon
- 33.895926°N 35.500934°E
- Location: Beirut, Lebanon

History
- Built: 1853
- Built for: Ottoman army

Site notes
- Area: 39,700 m^{2} (427,000 sq ft; 9.8 acres)
- Architectural style: Ottoman new order
- Governing body: Directorate General of Antiquities

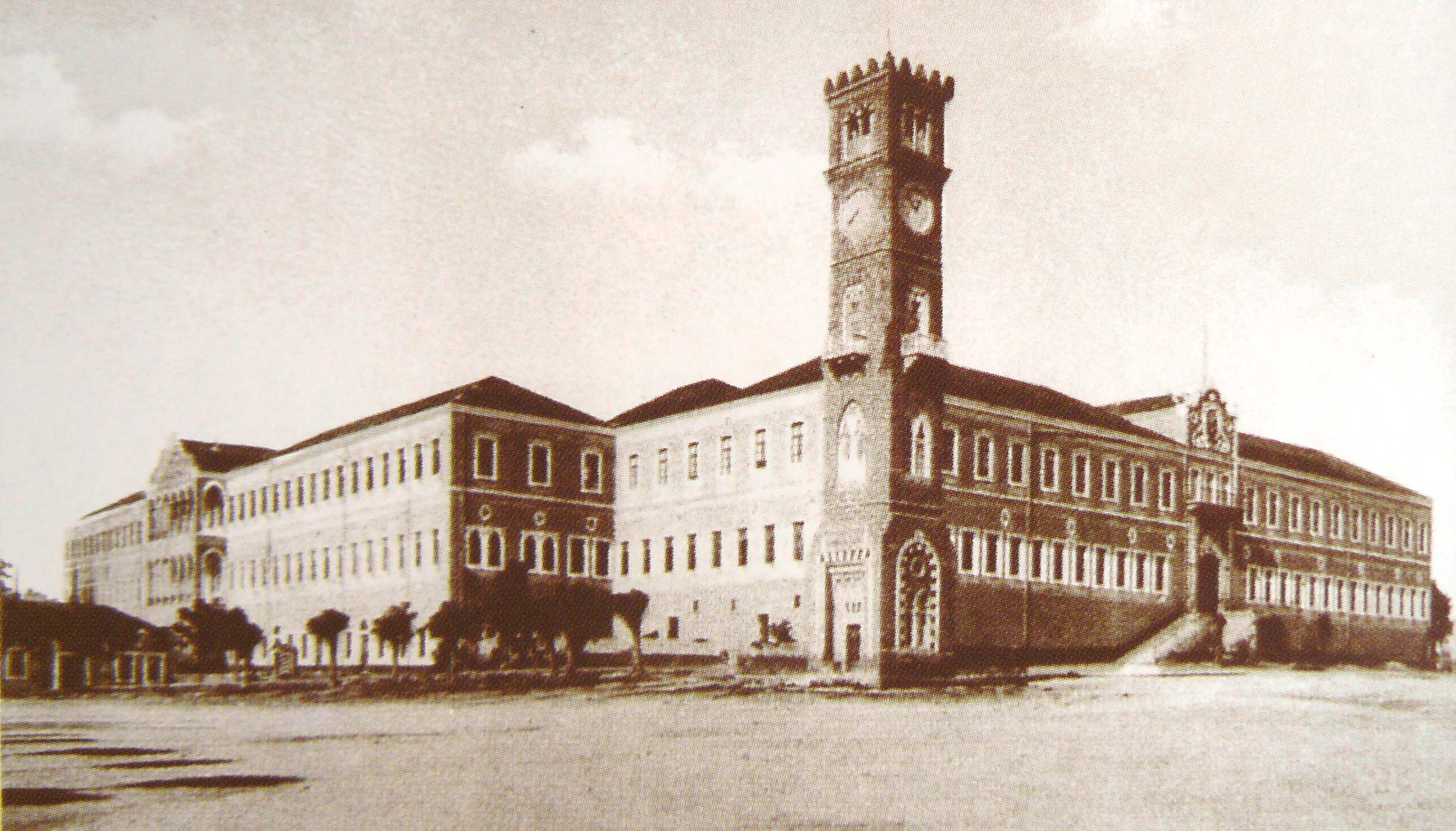
The Grand Serail in the early 1900s

The Grand Serail (Arabic: السراي الكبير, al-Sarāy al-Kabir; also known as the Government Palace) is the headquarters of the Prime Minister of Lebanon. It is situated atop a hill in downtown Beirut a few blocks away from the Lebanese Parliament building. The Grand Serail is a historic building, the most important of three Ottoman monuments on the Serail Hill, the others being the Council for Development and Reconstruction and the Hamidiyyeh clock tower.

== History ==
=== The barracks ===
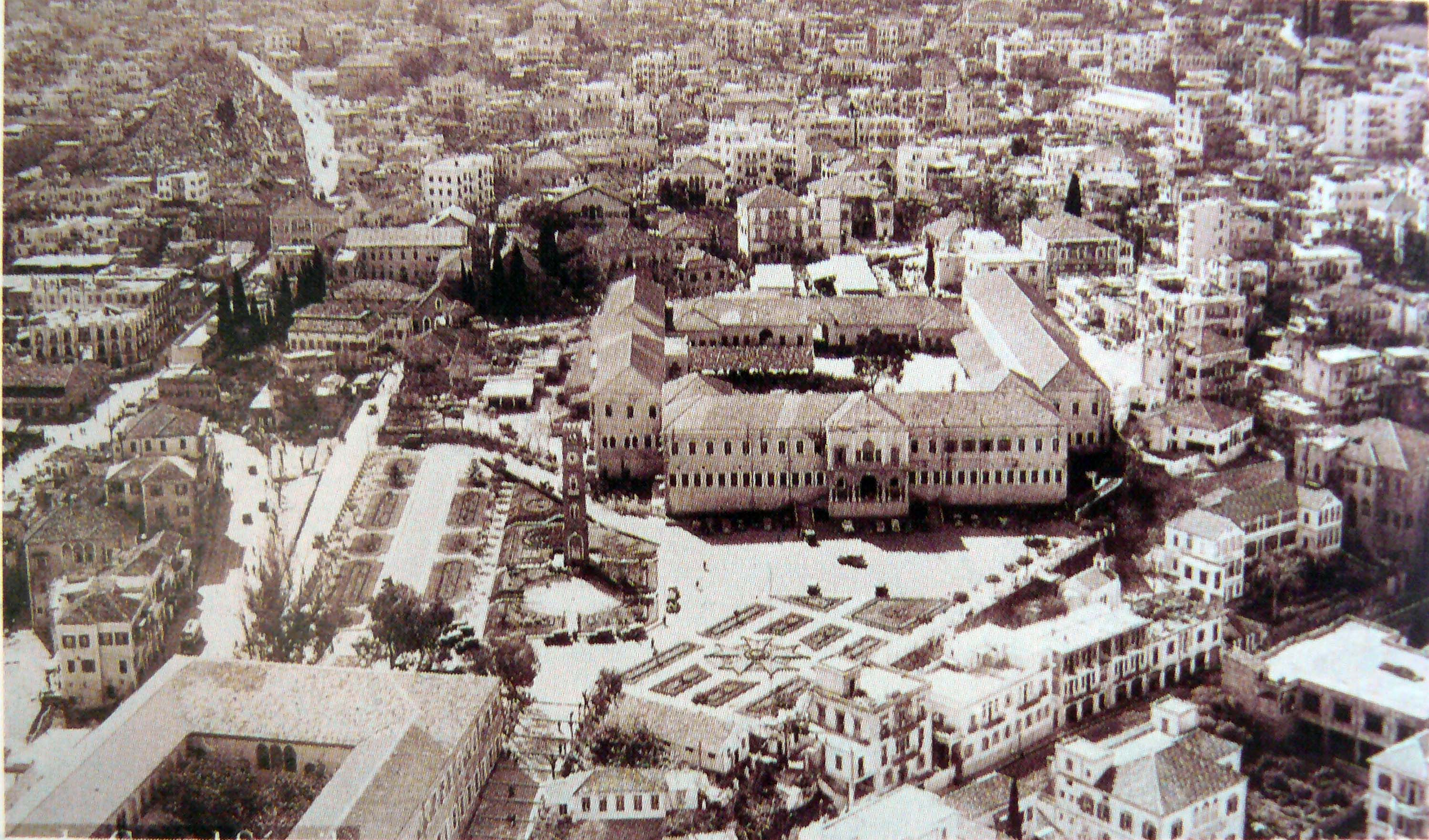
Aerial view of the Serail Hill

After its victory over the Ottomans in 1831, an Egyptian military contingent, led by Ibrahim Pasha set up camp on the western slope of the strategic extramural hill overlooking Beirut. The hill overlooked Suq-al Munajjidin (the weavers' bazaar), now replaced with Banks Street, and skirting Tal’at al Amrican and the city gate Bab Yaacub.

In his book "Taqwim al-Ikbal" Sheik Abdel Basit al-Unsi describes the hill as being "well situated, west of the city, away from the population and overseeing the sea and Beirut". Beirutis customarily referred to the hill as Al-Thakanat.

=== The garrison ===
North gate

In 1840, the Ottoman Empire with the support of the Prussian, Russian, and British navies, recaptured Syria from Ibrahim Pasha and set up its military base there. The building was first used as the headquarters of military and civilian departments and, after expansion, became the headquarters of Ottoman governors. Beirutis referred to it then as Al-Quishleh (modern Turkish: Kışla), a Turkish word for "Garrison". The fortification of the barracks began in 1853, and it was further expanded during the Crimean War. The building consisted of a single floor until 1856, when a second floor was added and the ground floor repurposed as the cavalry stables. Between 1877 and 1894 major structural modifications were made which gave the Serail its final form.

=== The Hospital and the Courthouse ===
Sultan Abdülaziz (ruled 1861–1876) ordered the building of a hospital (Hastahane in Turkish, usually shortened to Hastane in current modern Turkish), which was built in 1865, people referred to it as the military infirmary. The hospital building included two wings. Its northern wing housed a pharmacy (ajzah). When the French entered the city in 1918, they turned the hospital into a courthouse. Later the courthouse was moved to another location and the building became the Institute of Fine Art of the Lebanese University. however the war that raged through Beirut destroyed most parts of the courthouse and turned them into ruins until prime minister Rafik Hariri donated the sum needed for its reconstruction and renovation. Since its inauguration in 1992, the building serves as the headquarters of the Lebanese Council for Development and Reconstruction.

=== The Hamidiyyeh Clock Tower ===
In 1897, a clock tower (Note: Similar towers were built in numerous other cities of the Ottoman Empire, such as Istanbul, Izmir, Izmit, Adana, Jaffa, Nablus, Acre and Tripoli.) was built near the Grand Serail to celebrate the anniversary of Sultan Abdul Hamid II's coronation and to make up for the absence of a public clock indicating mandatory Muslim prayer times especially that many foreign institutions had built western style clock towers. The construction of the clock tower was approved by the Sultan following a letter of supplication from Beirut's governor Rashid Bey. The ceremonial laying of the first stone took place on 9 January 1897 (the birthday of the Sultan) in the presence of high officials, military representatives and members of the municipality of Beirut.

=== The High Commission ===
In 1918 after the defeat of the Ottoman Empire in World war one, the Flag of the Arab Revolt was briefly hoisted over the Grand Serail until the arrival of the allied forces who entered Lebanon by land and from the sea and occupied Beirut and the entire Lebanese coast on 8 October 1918. French colonel Depiepape was appointed by the commander of the allied forces General Allenby, he took control of the grand Serail and became the military governor of the country. With the removal of the Flag of the Arab Revolt, the Grand Serail was turned into the headquarters of the French Governor, who was granted the title of high commissioner of the French Government in the Levant. From then on the Grand Serail was referred to as the High Commission. In 1926 the French introduced changes to the northern facade of the Grand Serail. Thus a lobed arch balcony above the decorated entrance replaced the northern arched gate, which was moved to the southern entrance. The new balcony became a loggia for high commissioners and prime ministers' speeches. The French also removed a crown from over the arch of the northern entrance because it contained an engraved marble tablet showing the symbol of the Ottoman Empire.

=== The Presidential Headquarters ===
Sheik Bechara El Khoury, who was the first post-independence President of Lebanon, holding office from 21 September 1943 to 18 September 1952, turned the Serail into the presidential headquarters before moving it to the Qantari Palace in Beirut.

=== The Prime Minister's Headquarters ===
The Grand Serail became the headquarters of the Lebanese prime minister Riad as-Solh who was the first Prime Minister of Lebanon (1943–1945), after the country's independence and has been used as the Office of the president of the council of ministers headquarters ever since.

The 2020 Beirut explosions occurred about 2 km (1.2 mi) away from the palace, which sustained some damage. Prime Minister Hassan Diab's wife and daughter sustained minor injuries, while his health advisor, Petra Khoury, was taken from the palace to the hospital for cuts that required stitching.

== Architecture and renovation ==
Haut Commissariat

=== The Grand Serail ===
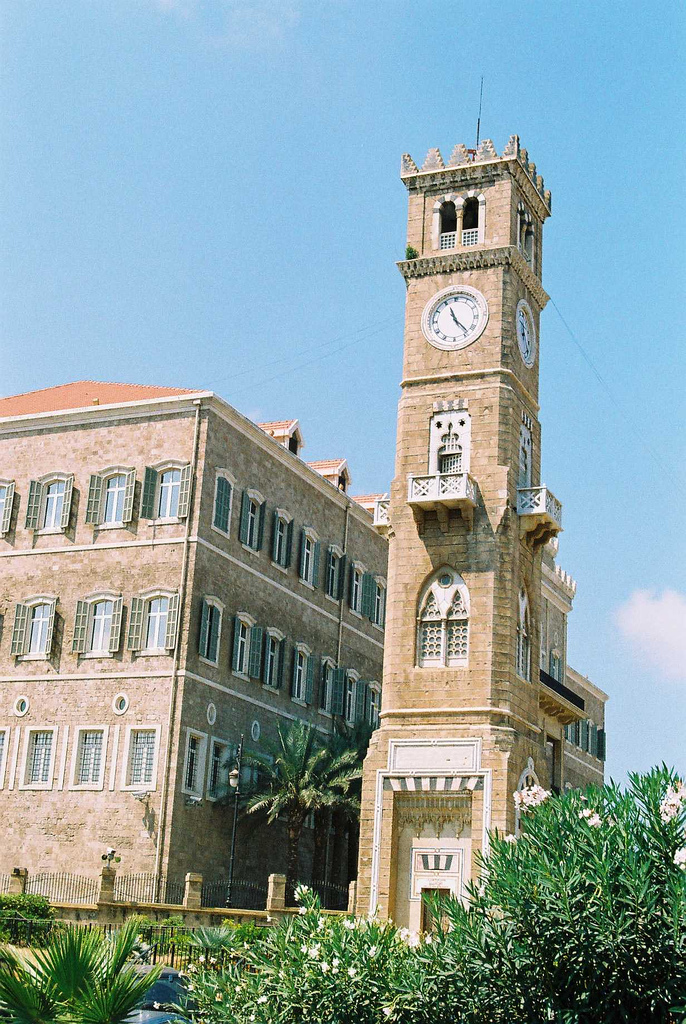
Hamidiyyeh Clock Tower

The Grand Serail followed the architectural design epitomizing the new Ottoman military organization known as the "New Order" (niẓām cedīd). Its elevated location and austere façade copied the Selimiye Barracks in Istanbul. The finished structure consisted of two tall floors with the longer façade spreading over 80 metres (260 ft). The eastern façade is adorned by an arcaded protruding portico flanked by two symmetrical wings each divided by three rows of 16 windows. The monumentality of the building was further emphasized in 1861 when the military hospital was constructed.
Particularly hit during the civil war, the Serail was a scarred site at the end of the hostilities. Its renovation to its present state of grandeur is a symbol of the vision and challenge involved in the BCD reconstruction. Restoration was completed in less than 3 years in 1998.
Today, the Grand Serail is a blend of heritage architecture with a modern interior and high-tech amenities. A faithful adaptation of the original Ottoman structure resulted in a larger, more functional building. The external walls were completely restored and stone from demolished buildings was used in the additional floor, thereby preserving a homogeneous facade. All contracting and handicrafts, including stone, marble, steel or carpentry works, were carried out by Lebanese firms. The Serail covers 39,700 sq. m of floor space. The Grand Serail's four wings are disposed around a large courtyard which flanked at the center by a limestone and Carrera marble fountain. Both the exterior and interior facades are covered by a total of 588 arches and arcades (282 lobes arches, 197 pointed arches, 6 rounded arches, 11 mandolin arches, 92 pointed arcades). The north gate is constitutes the central structural element of the four facades. It is 11 metres (36 ft) high and 7 metres (23 ft) in width and was inspired by the Beiteddine Palace's gates. In the middle of entrance's arch a marble tablet was inscribed under the request of prime minister Rafik Hariri which reads: Arabic: لو دامت لغيرك لما اتصلت إليك, romanized: If political rule lasts perpetually for anyone, it would not have reached you. The two upper floors comprise the Prime Minister's residence and office, offices for his staff, as well as the cabinet room and ministers' offices. The ground floor consists of a banquet hall, two receptions areas, a press room and a courtyard. Finally, an underground level includes a car-park, offices and rooms for the personnel. In all the Grand Serail includes 430 rooms and chambers in addition to the quarters for the maintenance and other service rooms.

=== The Hamidiyyeh Clock Tower ===
The Hamidiyyah Clock Tower was designed by Youssef Aftimus, and restored in 1994 to its original condition. The Clock Tower stands 25 metres (82 ft) tall, it was the tallest structure in Beirut at the time of its completion. It was built of Beiruti sandstone, Jounieh limestone, Damascene Basalt and Deir el Qamar red stone. The clock tower's 300 kg bell, suspended on the third floor was accessible by a set of 125 cast iron steps inside the tower's 4 by 4 metres (13 ft) shaft. This floor has four miniature neo-orientalist style balconies topped by the four large French made clock faces which were especially imported by the Ottoman embassy.

== See also ==
- Architecture of Lebanon
