= Serail Hill =

Hill in Beirut

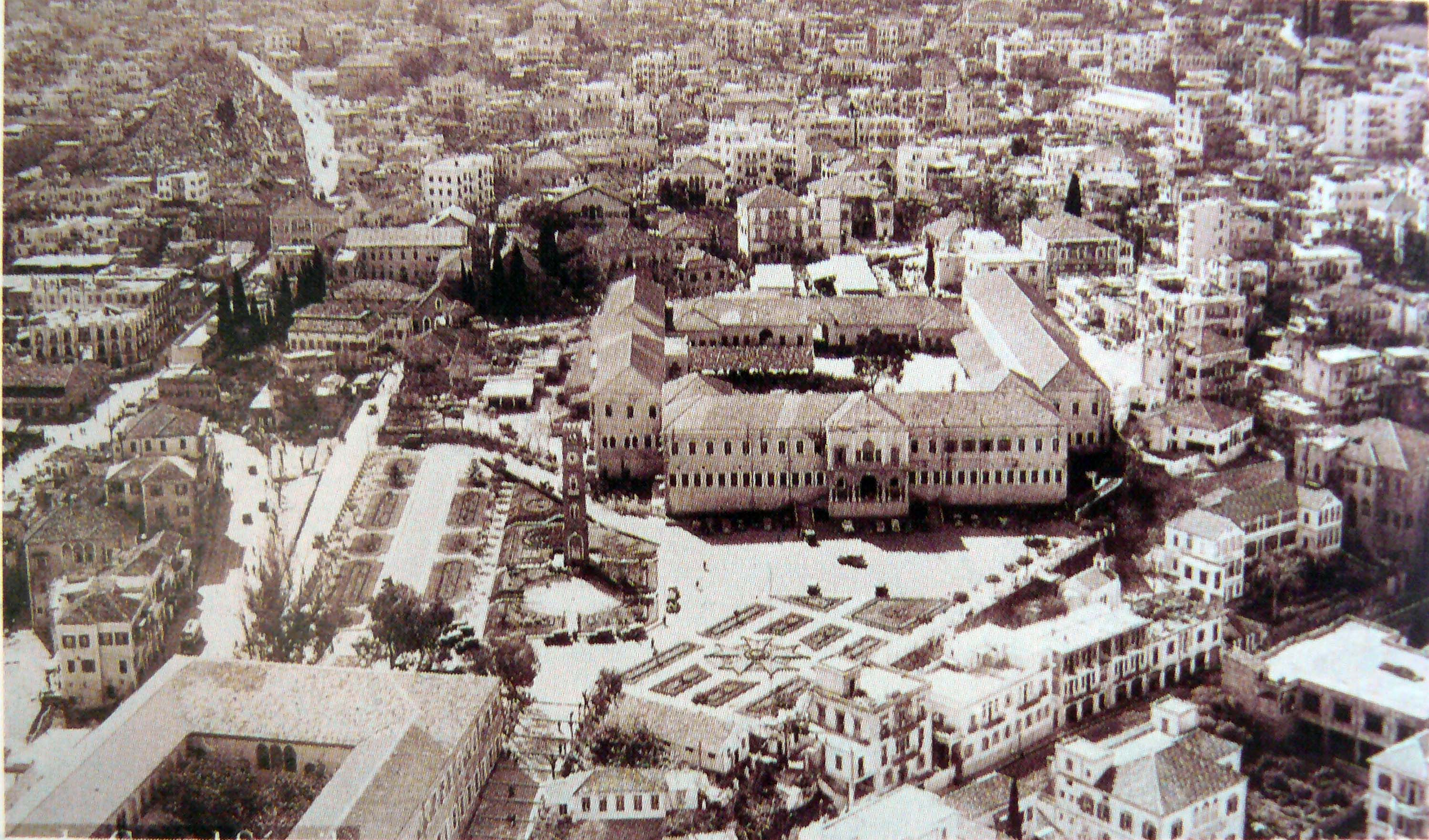
Aerial view of the Serail Hill at the turn of the 20th century

Serail Hill (Arabic: تلة السراي, romanized: Tallat as-Sarāy), also known as Qantari Hill (تلة القنطاري, Tallat al-Qanṭārī), is a hill in Beirut, Lebanon, that hosts three historic buildings. The first is the Grand Serail, the headquarters of the Prime Minister of Lebanon. The second is the headquarters for the Council for Development and Reconstruction, originally built as a military hospital. The third is Hamidiyyeh clock tower, built to celebrate the anniversary of Sultan Abdul Hamid II's coronation.

== Overview ==
Since the days of Emir Fakhreddine in the 17th century, Serail Hill was a strategic location and became, over the years, the seat of authority. Since 1999, it hosts the Prime Minister's offices and residence.

== Construction ==
In the 17th century, Emir Fakhreddine ordered the construction of a watchtower on Serail Hill in order to confirm his rise to power. Over the years, Serail Hill became the seat of authority in Beirut. In 1853, the military barracks for the Ottoman army was built, along with a parade ground. This was followed by a military hospital. When the barracks became the residence of Governor Fouad Pasha, a second floor was added and the building became the Grand Serail. The Serail Clock Tower, designed by the architect Youssef Aftimos, was inaugurated in 1898 in honor of Sultan Abdul Hamid II. During the French Mandate, the military hospital became the Court of Justice. In 1991, the building was converted in order to host the Council for Development and Reconstruction. A third floor was added to the Grand Serail. Inaugurated in 1999, today the building accommodates the Prime Minister's offices and residence.

== History ==
The buildings strategically located on Serail Hill have dominated the city since the days of Emir Fakhreddine. The Emir confirmed his rise to power with the construction of a watchtower – Burj Umm Dabbous – in a prominent location on the hill, in the 17th century. In their bid for control of the city, the Ottomans selected this location, from which Ibrahim Pasha's Egyptian military encampment had ruled for almost a decade. In 1853, the military barracks for the Ottoman army was built, along with a parade ground. This was followed a few years later by a military hospital. When the barracks became the residence of Governor Fuad Pasha, a second floor was added and the building became the Grand Serail. The Saint Louis Capuchin Cathedral was built in 1863; it overlooked the city. The Serail Clock Tower, designed by the architect Youssef Aftimos, was inaugurated in 1898 in honor of Sultan Abdul Hamid II. During the French Mandate, the military hospital became the Court of Justice. In 1991, the building was converted in order to host the Council for Development and Reconstruction. A third floor was added to the Grand Serail. Since its inauguration in 1999, the building accommodates the Prime Minister's offices and residence.

== Timeline ==
- 17th century: Construction of a watchtower – Burj Umm Dabbous – as a confirmation of Emir Fakhreddine's rise to power on Serail Hill.
- 1853: Egyptian military barracks for the Ottoman army were built along with a parade ground, followed by a military hospital. When the barracks became the residence of Governor Fuad Pasha, a second floor was added and the building became the Grand Serail.
- 1863: The Saint Louis Capuchin Cathedral was built.
- 1898: The Serail Clock Tower, designed by architect Youssef Aftimos, was inaugurated.
- 1991: The military hospital was converted in order to host the Council for Development and Reconstruction.
- 1991: The Grand Serail accommodates the Prime Minister's offices and residence.

== See also ==
- Ibrahim Pasha
- Youssef Aftimos
