= Lebanese Council for Development and Reconstruction =

Lebanese governmental organisation involved in repairing infrastructure damaged by war

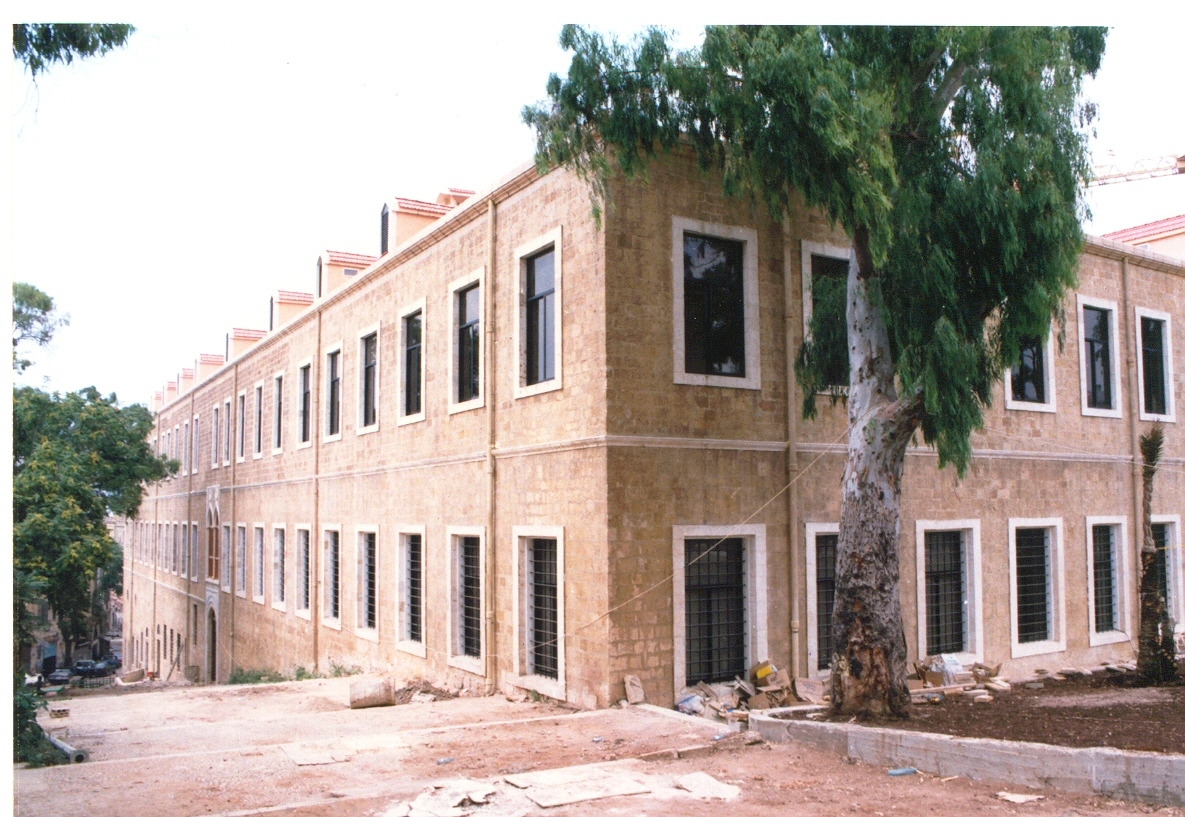
CDR Perspective

The Council for Development and Reconstruction (CDR) is a Lebanese governmental organisation established in 1977, during the Lebanese civil war, which has taken a major role in the sequence of rebuilding the damaged infrastructure of the country.

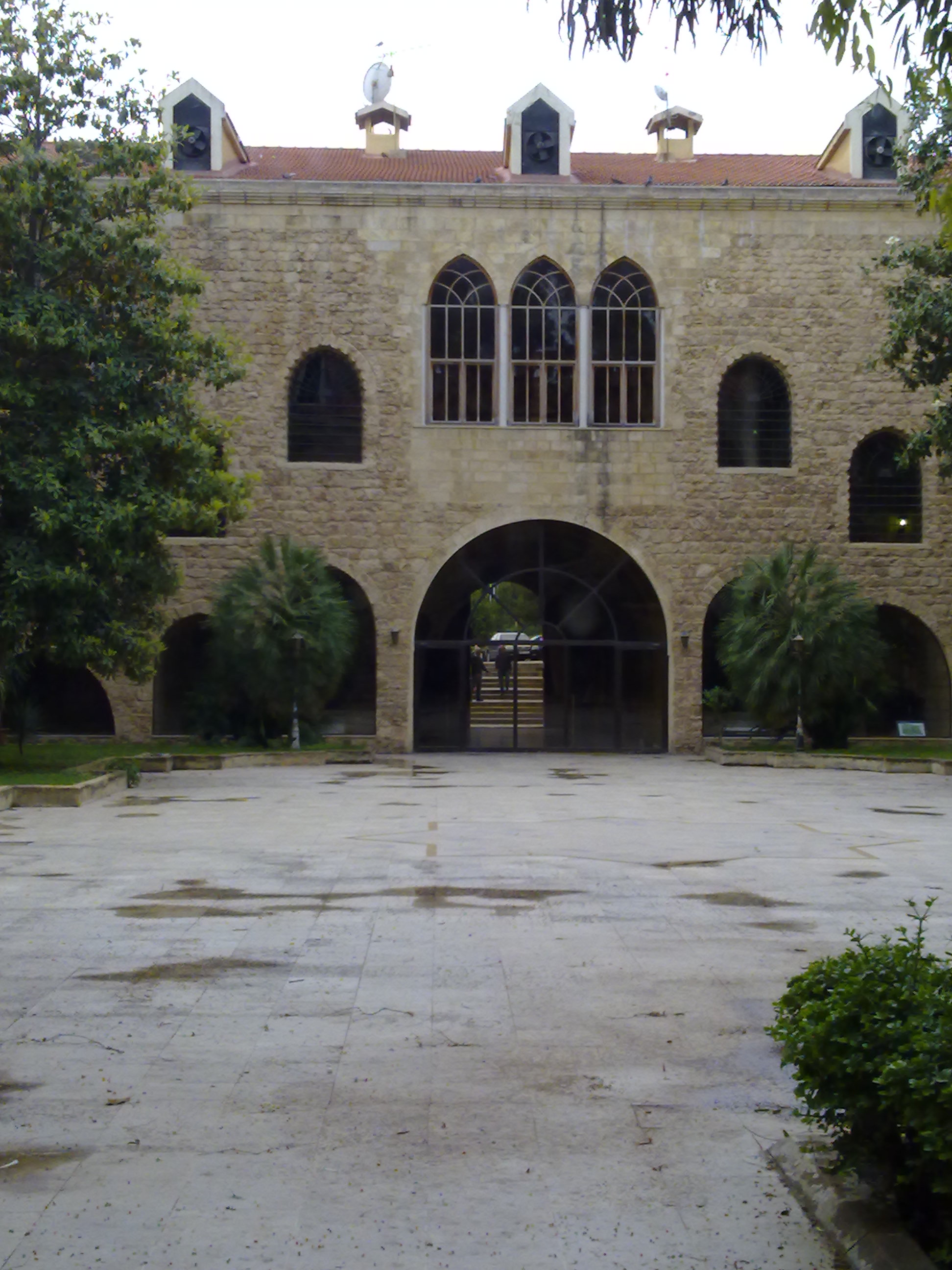
Medieval Architecture from the Ottoman Era

== History ==
The CDR was established in January 1977. Directly accountable to the prime minister, it was intended to assess infrastructural needs arising from Lebanon's civil war and allocate international and Lebanese aid for rebuilding the country. It committed $454 million in 1978 towards housing, road repairs, transport and rebuilding Beirut International Airport. In 1983 it could only raise $571 million of the $15 billion needed to rebuild Lebanon. International pledges of support were never completely forthcoming, and the organization faltered in the late 1980s. After the Ta'if Accord the CDR was refounded, gaining new legal powers in 1992 and becoming an important instrument for prime minister Rafic Hariri.

== Current activity ==
CDR is engaged in all phases of project implementation from planning, feasibility analysis, detailed design, bidding, expropriation, execution, and operation and maintenance of most public facilities on the behalf of the Government of Lebanon or other Lebanese public establishments.
