= Riad Al Solh Square =

Square in Beirut, Lebanon

Coordinates: 33°53′42.4″N 35°30′10.4″E

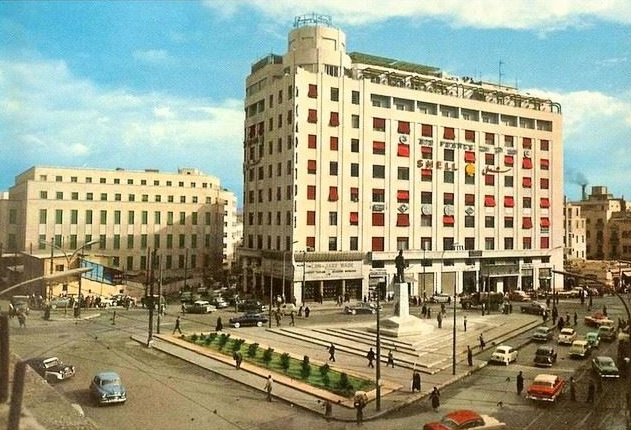
The square in the 1960s

Riad Al Solh Square (Arabic: ساحة رياض الصلح) is a square in the heart of downtown Beirut, Lebanon.

== Overview ==
The square was named after the first Prime Minister of independent Lebanon, Riad Al Solh. It underwent many transformations throughout Beirut’s history.

== Construction ==
The Damascus-Beirut road and a ring road around the old city were completed in 1863. The area became an urban square known as Sahat Assour. Used as a military parade ground and a cattle market for decades, the construction of a roofed market initiated a period of modernization. Later in 1943, Lebanon gained its independence and the square became a traffic island. Several new buildings were constructed in the early 1950s on its northern side, including the Capitole and Pan American buildings. In 1957, the square was renamed after it received the statue of Riad Al-Solh, designed by Marino Mazzacurati. The statue was returned to its original location in 1998, after it was removed during the Lebanese Civil War (1975-1990).

== History ==
Riad Al-Solh Square, named after the first Prime Minister of Lebanon, underwent several transformations throughout the history of Beirut. In Roman times, large public buildings dominated this area, formerly situated outside the Hellenistic city wall. Later, it became a gathering space outside the city gates.

The completion of the Damascus-Beirut road and a ring road around the old city in 1863 had a great impact on the area. It became an urban square known as Sahat Assour. After being used as a military parade ground and a cattle market for decades, the construction of a roofed market initiated a period of modernization. A public garden furnished with a kiosk was added, as well as a fountain built in honor of Sultan Abdul Hamid II. A municipal pharmacy and a telegraph service were built on the northern edge of the square.

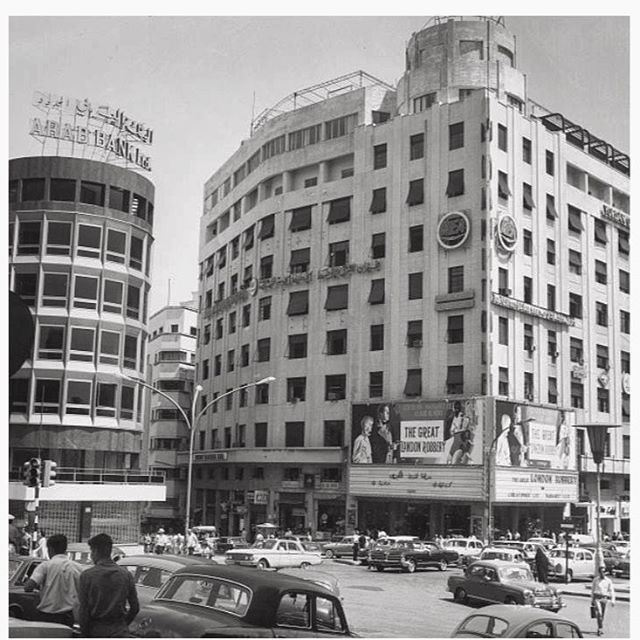
The square in 1971

After Lebanon gained its independence in 1943, the square became a traffic island. In the early 1950s, several new buildings were constructed on its northern side, including the Capitole and Pan American buildings. This modified the Ottoman character of the square, and completed the plans of modernization of the city. The square was renamed in 1957, when it received the statue of Riad Al-Solh, designed by Marino Mazzacurati. Removed during the Lebanese Civil War (1975-1990), the statue was returned to its original location in 1998.

== Timeline ==
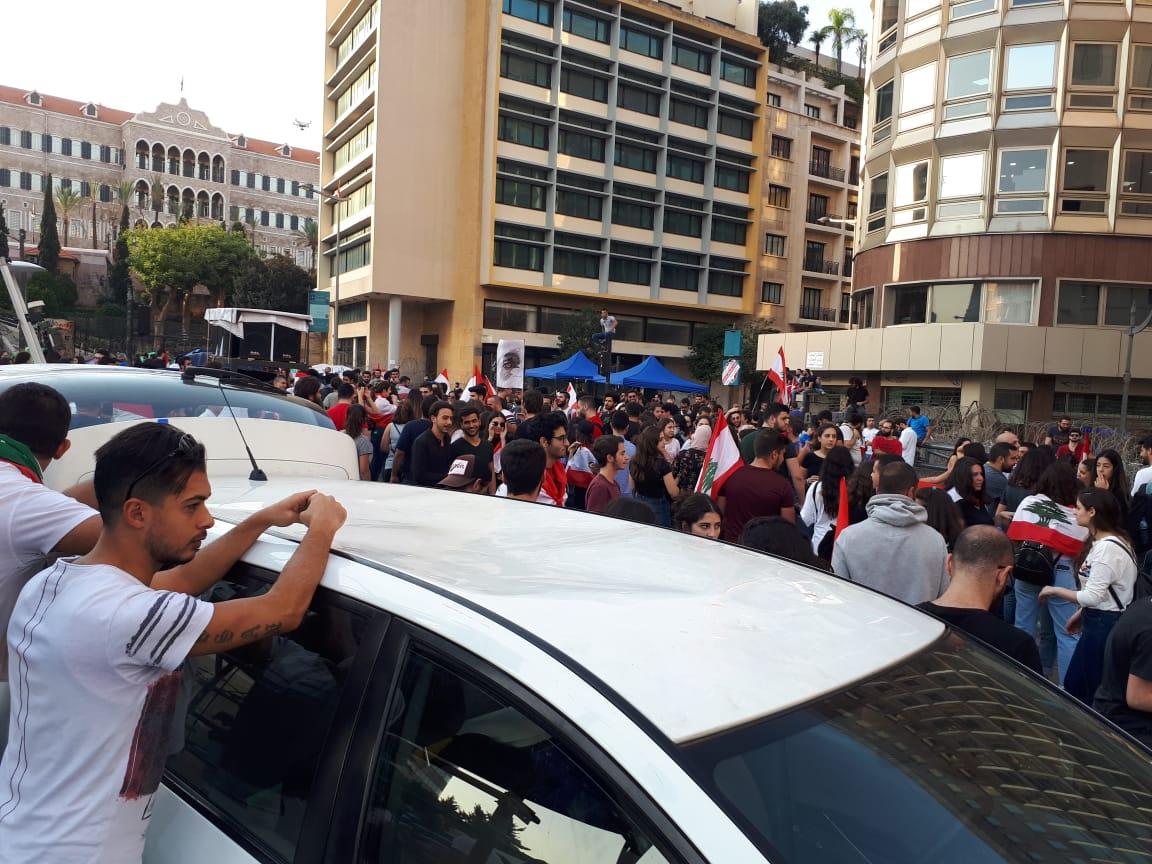
Protest in the square in 2019

Roman times: large public buildings dominated this area, later becoming a gathering space outside the city gates.

1863: The Damascus-Beirut road and a ring road around the old city were completed. The area became an urban square known as Sahat Assour.

1943: Lebanon gained its independence and the square became a traffic island.

Early 1950s: Several new buildings were constructed on its northern side, including the Capitole and Pan American buildings

1957: The square was renamed after it received the statue of Riad Al-Solh, designed by Marino Mazzacurati.

1998: The statue was returned to its original location after it was removed during the Civil War (1975-1990).

== See also ==
- Sultan Abdul Hamid II
- Lebanese Civil War
