= Tell Marj =

- Location within Syria
- 34.781111°N 36.376111°E
- Type: Tell
- Periods: PPNB, Neolithic
- Region: Homs
- Part of: Village

Site notes
- Material: stone, flints, pottery
- Excavation dates: 2008
- Archaeologists: Juan José Ibáñez; Michel Al-Maqdisi; Maya Haïdar Boustani
- Condition: Ruins
- Management: Directorate-General of Antiquities and Museums
- Public access: Yes

Tell al-Marj is a prehistoric, Neolithic Tell, about 5 hectares (540,000 ft^{2}) in size, located between Krak des Chevaliers and Homs, near the village of Tell es Safa in Syria.

== Excavations ==
The site was discovered in 2006 through surface finds by a combined project that commenced in 2004 as a partnership of the Museum of Lebanese Prehistory, Directorate General of Antiquities and Museums in Syria, the Mila and Fontanals Institution of the Higher Council for Scientific Research (Barcelona) and the International Institute for Prehistoric Research in the University of Cantabria (Santander). Scientific direction was carried out jointly by Dr. Michel Al-Maqdisi (Directorate of Antiquities and Museums of Syria), Dr. Maya Haïdar Boustani (Museum Lebanese Prehistory, LSU) and Dr. Juan José Ibañez (Mila and Fontanals Institution).

The site was geophysically surveyed in June 2008 using tomography to measure electrical resistance of the earth. Four areas were excavated based on the ground survey and traces of a basalt wall. Four stratigraphic levels were identified and a straight stone wall was discovered. Level 1 contained sediments composed of sands and dark clay with a large amount of organic material suggesting agriculture. Level II was more compacted and suggests more intensive agriculture. Level III contained a proportion of white gravel with dark clay with level IV's having lighter clay. Three walls were found with large stone blocks averaging between 40 and 80 cm in width.

== Materials recovered ==
A few sherds of fine pottery were found including red, black, glossy black (Dark Faced Burnished Ware, brown, beige, red outside and black inside, black outside and red inside. Forms include globular jars, high collar and straight cut containers. Some sherds show incised lines and had strong parallels to other neolithic sites on the Levantine coast such as Ras Shamra and Byblos. Other finds included a clay seal with a perforation and suspension on the reverse. It is stamped with a geometric design of a grid on the front. A small bull head figurine was found 40mm in length and 30mm in width. Two stone basalt fragments and a fragment of a limestone plaque were found. Personal decoration was limited to a single blue stone with a thin central perforation and two incisions measuring 6mm long. Flints found were in light beige, dark beige, honey, dark gray and translucent gray with a good state of preservation. Patina alterations and desilication were evident. Arrowheads found were matched with Amuq points and Byblos points.

== Agriculture and animal husbandry ==
Many animal remains were found, especially mammals, noted by the presence of teeth and antlers. Turtles and likely birds were also found to be sources of food. Several sediment samples were sieved and floated to collect possible remnants of micro and macro-remains of vegetation. Along with charcoal from the site, this has been preserved for analysis.

The tell showed numerous materials similar to those of Byblos and highlights the total absence of material dating after the middle of the Neolithic. Well-built permanent structures suggest land tenure and conservation.

== See also ==
- Bouqaia
- Tell Ezou
