= Tell Ezou =

- Location within Syria
- 34.729722°N 36.481944°E
- Type: Tell
- Periods: PPNB, Neolithic
- Region: Homs
- Part of: Village

Site notes
- Material: stone, flints, pottery
- Excavation dates: 2008
- Archaeologists: Juan José Ibáñez; Michel Al-Maqdisi; Maya Haïdar Boustani
- Condition: Ruins
- Management: Directorate-General of Antiquities and Museums
- Public access: Yes

Tell Ezou is a prehistoric, Neolithic tell, about 2 hectares (220,000 ft^{2}) in size, located between Krak des Chevaliers and Homs, in Syria.

== Discovery and survey ==
The site was discovered in 2004 following the discovery of Bronze Age and Neolithic artifacts and three megalithic monuments. The discovery occurred during a survey organized as a partnership between the Museum of Lebanese Prehistory, the Directorate General of Antiquities and Museums in Syria, the Mila and Fontanals Institution of the Higher Council for Scientific Research, and the International Institute for Prehistoric Research at the University of Cantabria. The project directors were Dr. Michel Al-Maqdisi (Directorate of Antiquities and Museums of Syria), Dr. Maya Haïdar Boustani (Museum Lebanese Prehistory, LSU), and Dr. Juan José Ibañez (Mila and Fontanals Institution).

== Excavations ==
The site was badly damaged in 2007 by new work done with flattening bulldozers; only the eastern part of one tell mound remained, with another cut in two, and one of the megalithic monuments had been completely destroyed in the process. Seven small soundings were taken in total, three hitting bedrock between ten and thirty centimetres. It was suggested that this could have been the result of the recent demolition of the land for a plantation by a bulldozer. The four other sounds hit architectural remains.

Sounding FC82 revealed a foundation wall almost one metre wide, formed by layers of basalt boulders. Similar boulders were found to the west, which may indicate the existence of another wall perpendicular to the first. Bronze Age pottery along with a serrated sickle were found at this site, and the walls and blocks suggested a rectangular building.

Sounding CA72 was taken in an area of 3 x 1 m (approximately 9.8 x 3.2 ft) where the surface layer suggested a mud wall, almost one meter wide in an east–west direction. The wall was preserved to a height of one centimeter. South of the wall was a bed of stones suggested to be a floor. This area was excavated and another floor found ten centimeters lower than the first made of large basalt stones with diameters ranging from twenty to thirty centimeters. The wall and the lower floor were suggested to be different layers of occupation, the walls for the first were not found. Beneath this, sandy black earth was found where the excavation was halted. Bronze Age pottery and flint were collected and a fragment of a bronze object in the first level wall.

Sounding BQ97 excavated an area of 4 x 4 m (approx. 13 x 13 ft). The surface was covered with a heap of stones which examination suggested was due to clearing of the fields for agriculture. The remains of a wall were found under this rockpile, again approximately one meter wide. This was another foundation wall following a northwest to southeast direction, formed by two layers of large blocks of basalt. The presence of two aligned blocks southwest of the wall may indicate another perpendicular to the first. Pottery recovered was dated to the Bronze Age and obsidian was found in this area including twelve carved pieces.

Sounding CQ87 was again a 4 x 4 m (approx. 13 x 13 ft) excavation which revealed a floor very near the surface that was semi-circular in shape and made of basalt stones with a diameter of approximately ten centimeters. No walls were found but beneath these slabs was found another surface formed of flat tiled stones which are suggested to be two separate Bronze Age layers. Bronze Age pottery was found along with a large number of worked flints and some obsidian. Lower still the team found another layer of architecture that they tentatively date to the Neolithic, this consisted of a dirt floor bounded by three walls that had been beaten until leveled. The walls drew a rectangular plan. Some stones formed a circle in the west of the building suggested a post hole in the dirt floor. The structure seemed to be part of a rectangular house oriented in an east–west axis. The post hole was an equal distance from both long walls which are built directly on bedrock which is a natural layer of altered basalt. Neolithic pottery of this level is made by hand and is very coarse with simple straight or sometimes ovoid form and notable for its lack of decor. Three parts of a sickle were found and a fragment of an Amuq point arrowhead, showing signs of having been made hastily. One piece of obsidian was found in between the Bronze Age and Neolithic levels.

== Analysis and conclusions ==
The pottery is quite eroded and the bone is not preserved. The remains of flint seem to showcase quick and efficient technology at the time. There was an abundance of pieces of pressure carved obsidian that were used as tools. In addition, presence of maintenance products and splinters found with pieces indicates that this was worked on site. The relative importance of obsidian as stone tool material suggests the existence of a procurement network and distribution of this material from the Anatolian sources. Neolithic levels have been documented at the bottom of the CQ87 sounding. This has levelled architecture where part of 3 m wide rectangular house was documented, its length was not determined. A layer of stones was found at the base of wall, indoor clay floors and a possible post hole. The archaeological material of this level has some similarities to those of Al Wakara 1 (H122) and Wadi Qawyak (H130), located in the basalt plain further east.

== Site conservation and potential demolition ==
Tell Ezou is located in a basaltic region with road access from Khirbet al-Hamam, where a well-preserved Bronze Age and Neolithic site awaits a more extensive excavation. It is difficult to classify or schedule as a monument and is situated on private land. The owners were very understanding and the team very well received by the locals during their surveys. They, however, expressed their interest to turn the archaeological site into an olive plantation or wheat field. This may be their choice but they will have to clear the ancient blocks of basalt left over from prehistory, an obvious risk to the site, but at least Doctor Boustani's team has recorded something here for local, regional and global heritage.

== See also ==
- Bouqaia
- Tell Marj
