= Jean Pouilloux =

French hellenist archaeologist (1917–1996)

Professor Jean Pouilloux (born 31 October 1917 in Le Vert (Deux-Sèvres), France; died 23 May 1996 at Pimontin (Rhone)) was a French hellenist archaeologist.

He was educated at the École normale supérieure de la rue d'Ulm from 1939 to 1944. He completed his training and made his initial research at the French School at Athens, then was appointed in 1949 to the Faculty of Arts in Lyon. From 1957 to 1985 he was Professor of Greek language, literature and epigraphy at the University of Lyon and the University Lumière Lyon 2. Specialist in archeology and Greek epigraphy, he worked at Delphi, Rhamnus in Attica, the island of Thasos and Cyprus where he founded and directed an archaeological mission. He was a member of the Académie des inscriptions et belles-lettres, several French and foreign academies and in 1988, president of the Institute of France.

His teaching has attracted several generations of students but Jean was not only a teacher. In 1959, he founded within the University of Lyon's Faculty of Arts, the Fernand Courby Institute, named after a Hellenist archaeologist who taught in the same faculty between the two wars. In later years, he created a dynamic team around him, officially recognized by the CNRS in the 1960s. In 1964, he obtained permission to excavate a large archaeological site in Cyprus, the ancient city of Salamis.

Jean Pouilloux was a member of the National Council for Scientific Research, the Universities Advisory Committee, National Council of archaeological research, and for years on the Ministry of Foreign Affairs Committee on the excavations. For four years he chaired the Centre for Archaeological Research at CNRS in Sophia-Antipolis. The culmination of his activity was the creation in 1975 of the Maison de l'Orient et de la Méditerranée where he served as director until 1978. In 1976, he was appointed scientific director of humanities at the CNRS for six years. He was also notable for translation of Jewish-Greek literature in the 1960s, collaborating with Roger Arnaldez to publish works of Philo of Alexandria, of which he personally translated four volumes.

== Positions held ==
- 1944-1945 - Professor at the Lycée d'Angers
- 1945-1949 - Member of the French School of Athens
- 1951-1954 - Assistant of ancient history at the Faculty of Arts, Lyon
- 1954 - Member of the French School of Athens
- 1955-1957 - Lecturer at the Faculty of Arts of Besançon
- 1957-1985 - Senior Lecturer, then Professor at the Faculty of Arts of Lyon and University Lyon 2
- 1959 - Founder and Director of the Institute Fernand Courby
- 1964-1972 - Director of the French archaeological mission of Salamis in Cyprus
- 1970 - Corresponding Member of the German Archaeological Institute
- 1972-1976 - President of the Center for Archaeological Research of the National Centre for Scientific Research
- 1972 - Member of the Academy of Sciences, Humanities and Arts of Lyon
- 1975 - Founder of the Maison de l'Orient et de la Méditerranée, originally called "Maison de l'Orient méditerranéen ancien"
- 1975-1978 - Director of Maison de l'Orient et de la Méditerranée
- 1975 - Member of the Academy of Athens
- 1976 - Corresponding member of the Greek Archaeological Society
- 1976 - Doctor Honoris Causa from the University of Thessaloniki
- 1976-1982 - Scientific Director of Humanities at the National Center for Scientific Research
- 1978 - Member of the l'Académie des inscriptions et belles lettres
- 1979 - Member of the Academy of Bordeaux
- 1988 - President of the l'Académie des inscriptions et belles lettres
- 1988 - President of the Institut de France
- 1986 - Chairman of the Foundation for the Lexicon Iconographicum Mythologiae Classicae (LIMC)
- 1982-1991 - President of the Association des amis des sources chrétiennes
- 1988 - President of the Association of Association des amis de la Maison de l'Orient
- 1989 - Doctor Honoris Causa from the University of Montreal
- 1990 - Foreign Member Emeritus of the Archaeological Institute of America (Boston)

== Selected bibliography ==
- Choix d'inscriptions grecques, 1st edition, 1960, University of Lyon Press, later edition by the Académie des inscriptions et belles-lettres « Epigraphica », 2003.
  - De agricultura, Philo of Alexandria, Translation, Cerf, coll. « Sources chrétiennes » : n° 9, 1961.
  - De plantatione, Philo of Alexandria, Translation, Cerf, coll. « Sources chrétiennes » :n° 10, 1961.
  - De vita Mosis, I-II, Philo of Alexandria, Translation, Cerf, coll. « Sources chrétiennes » : n° 22, 1967.
  - De æternitate mundi, Philo of Alexandria, Translation, Cerf, coll. « Sources chrétiennes » :n° 30, 1969.
- collaboration : Nouveau choix d'inscriptions grecques, 1st edition in 1971, University of Lyon Press, later edition by the Académie des inscriptions et belles-lettres « Epigraphica », 2005.
- ΑΛΕΞΑΝΔΡΙΝΑ. Hellénisme, judaïsme et christianisme à Alexandrie, mélanges offerts au P. Claude Mondésert, Cerf, 1987.
- Preface : La Collection « Sources chrétiennes ». Éditer les Pères de l'Église au XXe siècle, Cerf, 1995.
