= Bouqaia =

Coordinates: 34°42′29″N 36°20′16″E

Bouqaia is a basin in the Homs Gap, Syria, at the foot of the Marmarita hills.

The geography and geomorphology of this alluvial filled, tectonic depression has been explored as part of a wider investigation of the area by various research bodies whose is the archaeological and palaeoenvironmental evolution of the central Levant. The survey project commenced in 2004 as a partnership of the Museum of Lebanese Prehistory, Directorate General of Antiquities and Museums in Syria, the Mila and Fontanals Institution of the Higher Council for Scientific Research (Barcelona) and the International Institute for Prehistoric Research in the University of Cantabria (Santander). Scientific direction was carried out jointly by Dr. Michel Al-Maqdisi (Directorate of Antiquities and Museums of Syria), Dr. Maya Haïdar Boustani (Museum Lebanese Prehistory, LSU) and Dr. Juan José Ibañez (Mila and Fontanals Institution). Studies of the late pleistocene and early holocene sedimentary record of the basin has defined a stratigraphical framework for further studies of the area. Studies of the sedimentary sequences suggests an aridification phase with seasonal precipitation patterns increasing and reducing total precipitation. Using further archaeological information from the area has shown how palaeoenvironmental changes have contributed to differing settlement strategies in the study area.

The Neolithic or possibly PPNB archaeological site of Tell Marj is located on top of a hill dominating the Bouqaia, in the central-western area of the basin. Tell Ezou is further east.
