= Halabiye Dam =

Dam in Syria

- Proposed location of the Halabiye Dam
- Country: Syria
- Location: Deir ez-Zor Governorate
- Coordinates: 35°39′50″N 39°49′50″E
- Status: Proposed

Dam and spillways
- Impounds: Euphrates

The Halabiye Dam (or Zalabiye Dam) is a proposed dam on the Euphrates in Deir ez-Zor Governorate, Syria. It will be the fourth and most southern dam on the Syrian Euphrates, after the Tishrin Dam, the Tabqa Dam and the Mansoura Dam.

== Project ==
The proposed location for the dam is the narrow gap in the Euphrates valley northwest of Deir ez-Zor that is created by basalt outcrops on the left and right river banks. It is expected that dry areas will be brought under cultivation with irrigation water provided by the dam. In preparation of this project, the director of the Syrian Directorate-General of Antiquities and Museums (DGAM) appealed in 2009 to international teams of archaeologists to participate in the rescue excavations of the archaeological sites that would be threatened by the construction of the dam and the flooding of its reservoir. These excavations were expected to be carried out between 2010 and 2012. The sites that are threatened are located in the area that is projected to be flooded by the reservoir and in the area where construction works for the dam will take place. Important sites that are threatened include the Roman–Byzantine sites of Halabiye and Zalabiye that were first fortified by the Palmyrene queen Zenobia in the 3rd century CE. The lower town of Halabiye will be partially flooded by the reservoir and the Syrian government is cooperating with the United Nations Development Programme (UNDP) and UNESCO to limit the impact of the dam on this site as well as on Zalabiye. Other threatened sites include Bronze Age Tell Ma’dan and Tell Humeyda with Ubaid, Uruk and Byzantine material. Given the current instability in the region, it can be assumed that the project has been postponed.

== See also ==
- Water resources management in Syria
