= Mathurin Régnier =

French writer (1573–1613)

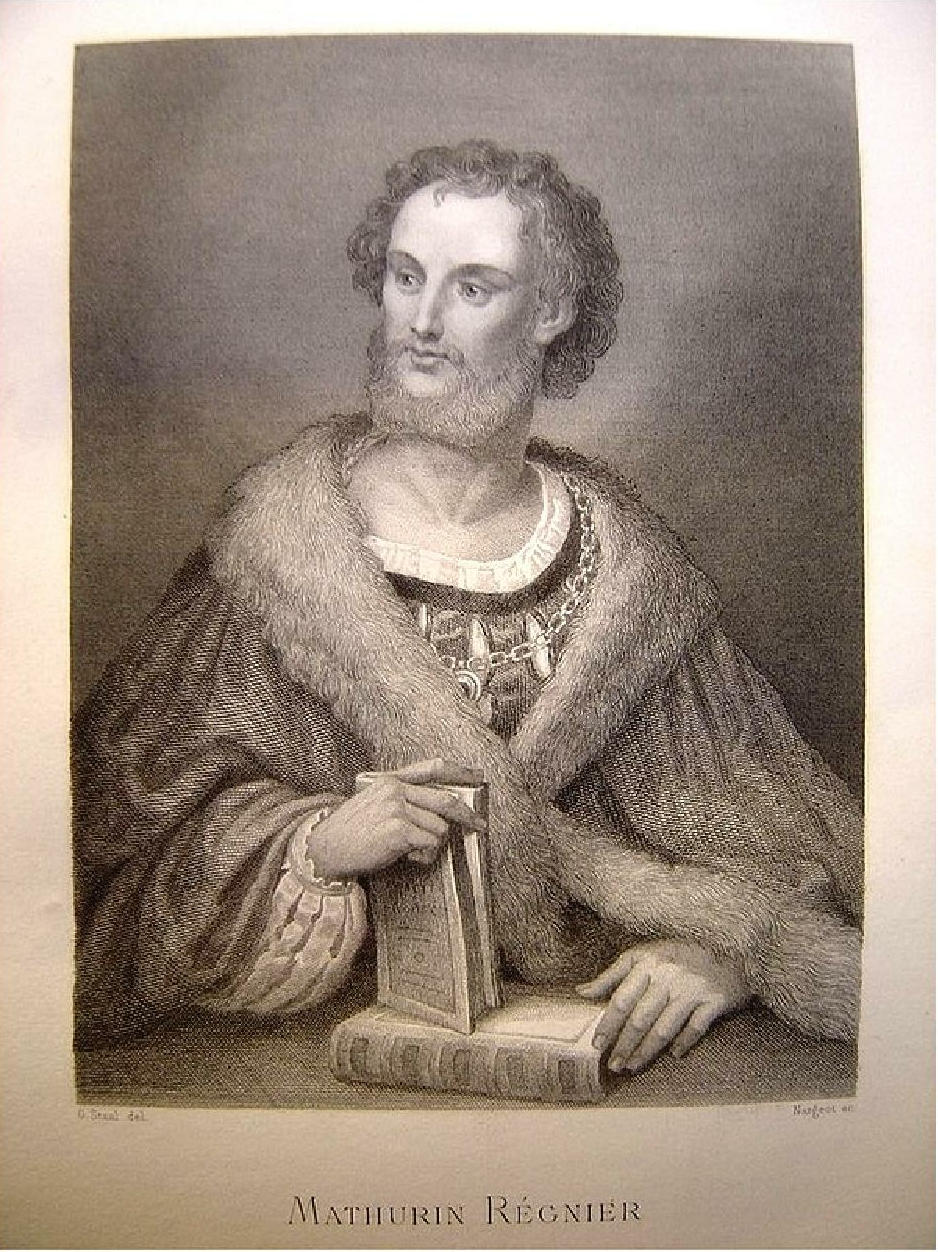
- A 19th century engraving of Régnier
- Born: 21 December 1573; Chartres
- Died: 22 October 1613; Rouen
- Occupation: Satirist

Mathurin Régnier (December 21, 1573 – October 22, 1613) was a French satirist.

== Life ==
Régnier was born in Chartres, which at that time was part of the Orléanais.

His father, Jacques Régnier, was a bourgeois of good means and position; his mother, Simone Desportes, was the sister of the poet Philippe Desportes. Desportes, who was richly beneficed and in great favor at court, seems to have been regarded as Mathurin Régnier's natural protector and patron; and the boy himself, with a view to his following in his uncle's steps, was tonsured at eight years old.

Little is known of his youth, and it is chiefly conjecture which fixes the date of his visit to Italy in a humble position in the suite of the cardinal, François de Joyeuse, in 1587. The cardinal was accredited to the papal court in that year as protector of the royal interests. Regnier found his duties irksome, and when, after many years of constant travel in the cardinals service, he returned definitely to France about 1605, he took advantage of the hospitality of Desportes.

He early began the practice of satirical writing, and the enmity which existed between his uncle and the poet François de Malherbe gave him occasion to attack the latter. In 1606 Desportes died, leaving nothing to Régnier, who, though disappointed of the succession to Desportes's abbacies, obtained a pension of 2000 livres, chargeable upon one of them. He was also made in 1609 canon of Chartres through his friendship with the lax bishop, Philippe Hurault, at whose abbey of Royaumont he spent much time in the later years of his life. But the death of Henri IV. deprived him of his last hope of great preferments. His later life had been one of dissipation, and he died at Rouen at his hotel, the Ecu d'Orlans, in October 1613.

== Works ==
About the time of his death numerous collections of licentious and satirical poems were published, while others remained in manuscript. Gathered from these there has been a floating mass of licentious epigrams, etc., attributed to Régnier, little of which is certainly authentic, so that it is very rare to find two editions of Régnier which exactly agree in contents. His undoubted work falls into three classes: regular satires in alexandrine couplets, serious poems in various metres, and satirical or jocular epigrams and light pieces, which often, if not always, exhibit considerable licence of language.

The real greatness of Régnier consists in the vigour and polish of his satires, contrasted and heightened as that vigour is with the exquisite feeling and melancholy music of some of his minor poems. In these Régnier is a disciple of Pierre Ronsard (whom he defended brilliantly against Malherbe), without the occasional pedantry, the affectation or the undue fluency of the La Pléiade; but in the satires he seems to have had no master except the ancients, for some of them were written before the publication of the satires of Vauquelin de la Fresnaye, and the Tragiques of Agrippa d'Aubigné did not appear until 1616. He has sometimes followed Horace closely, but always in an entirely original spirit. His vocabulary is varied and picturesque, and is not marred by the maladroit classicism of some of the Ronsardists.

Régnier's Satire IX, À Monsieur Rapin (1608) criticizes François de Malherbe for his strict approach to classical poetry writing. In Satire XIII, Macette ou l'hypocrisie déconcertée (1608), Régnier satirizes hypocritical religious devotion, in a piece similar to Molière's Tartuffe.

Les Premieres d'Euvres ou satyres de Regnier (Paris, 1608) included the Discours au rol and ten satires. There was another in 1609, and others in 1612 and 1613. The author had also contributed to two collections : Les Muses gaillardes in 1609 and Le Temple d'Apollon in 1611. In 1616 appeared Les Satyres et autres œuvres folastres du sieur Régnier, with many additions and some poems by other hands. Two famous editions by Elzevir (Leiden, 1642 and 1652) are highly prized. The chief editions of the 18th century are that of Claude Brossette (printed by Lyon & Woodman, London, 1729), which supplies the standard commentary on Régnier, and that of Lenglet Dufresnoy (printed by J. Tonson, London, 1733). The editions of Prosper Poitevin (Paris, 1860), of Ed. de Barthlemy (Paris, 1862), and of E. Courbet (Paris, 1875), may be specially mentioned. The last, printed after the originals in italic type, and well edited, is perhaps the best. See also Vianey's Mathurin Régnier (1896); M. H. Cherrier, Bibliographie de Mathurin Régnier (1884).

== Tributes ==
- His hometown, Chartres, honors his memory with a street bearing his name, connecting boulevard Chasles and Place des Halles. On this same square, a stele pays tribute to him and his uncle Philippe Desportes. In the district of La Madeleine, is also the college Mathurin-Regnier.
- A street in Paris bears his name, in the 15th arrondissement, between rue de Vaugirard and rue Dutot. There is also a street bearing his name in Perpignan, in the district of the station.
- In 1842, Alfred de Musset did him honor in his poem On laziness.
- Around 1846, Eugène Delacroix realized in watercolor and gouache a drawing representing him.
Tributes to Mathurin Régnier

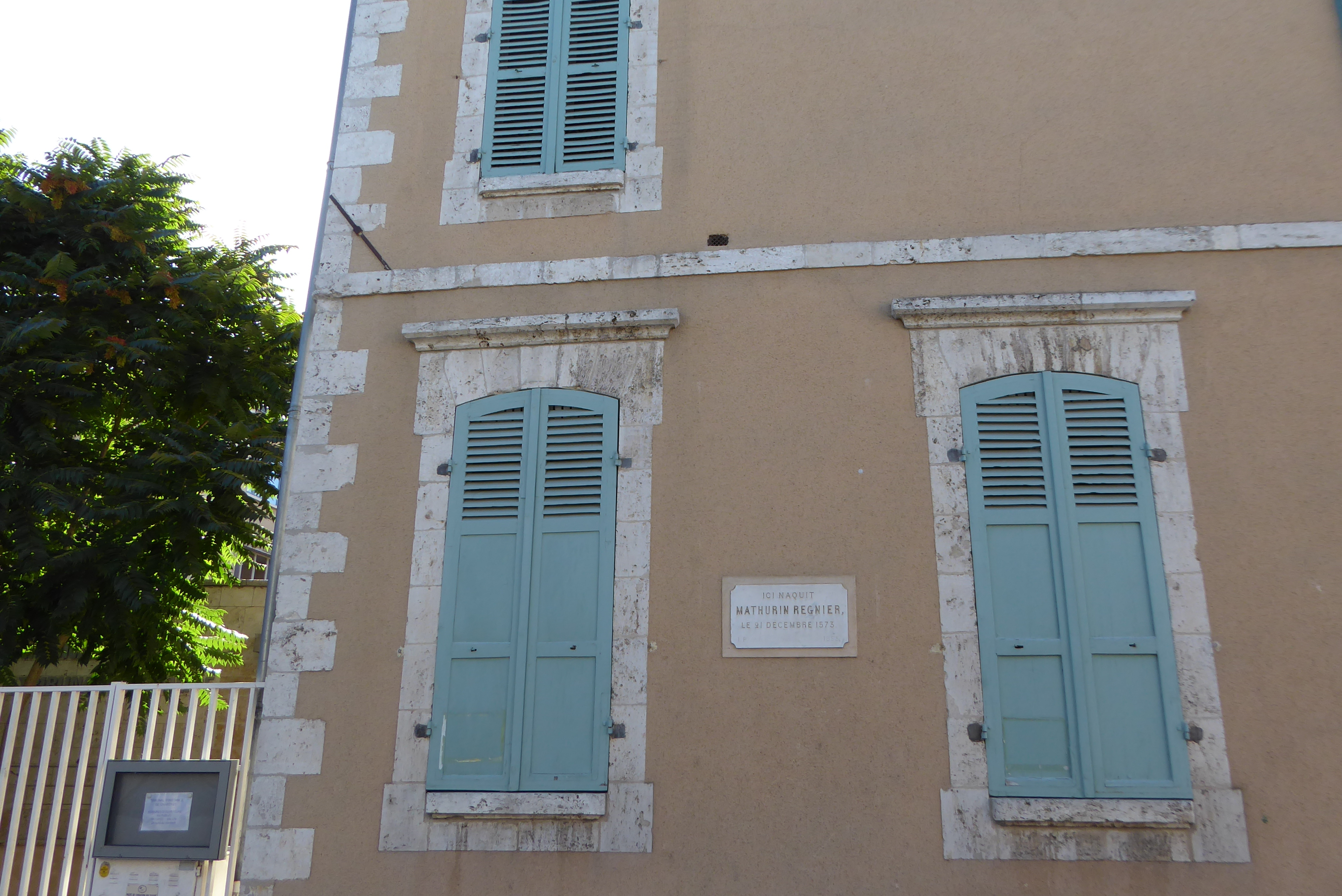
Birthplace of Mathurin Régnier, Mathurin Régnier street.

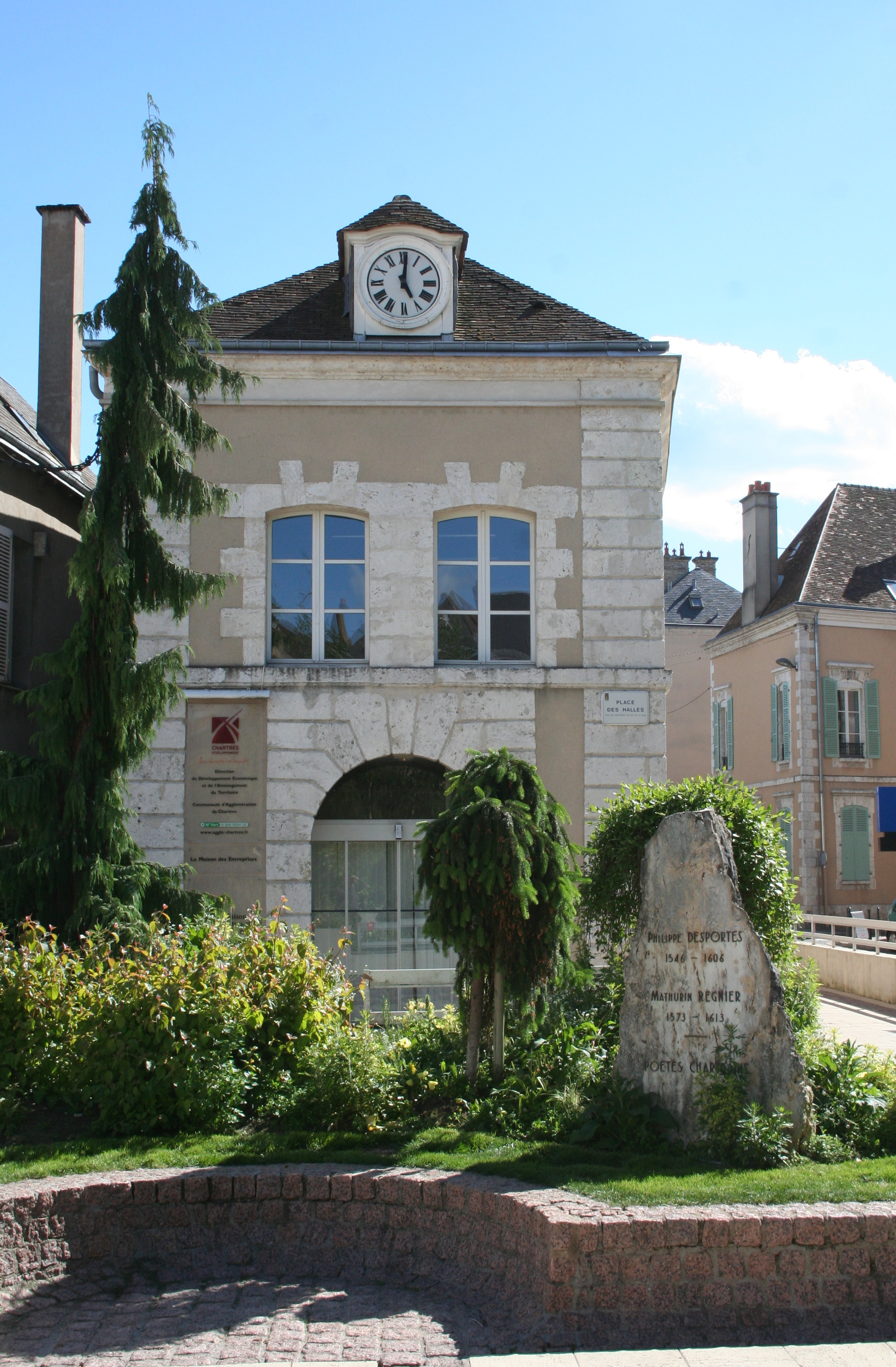
Stele, place des Halles.

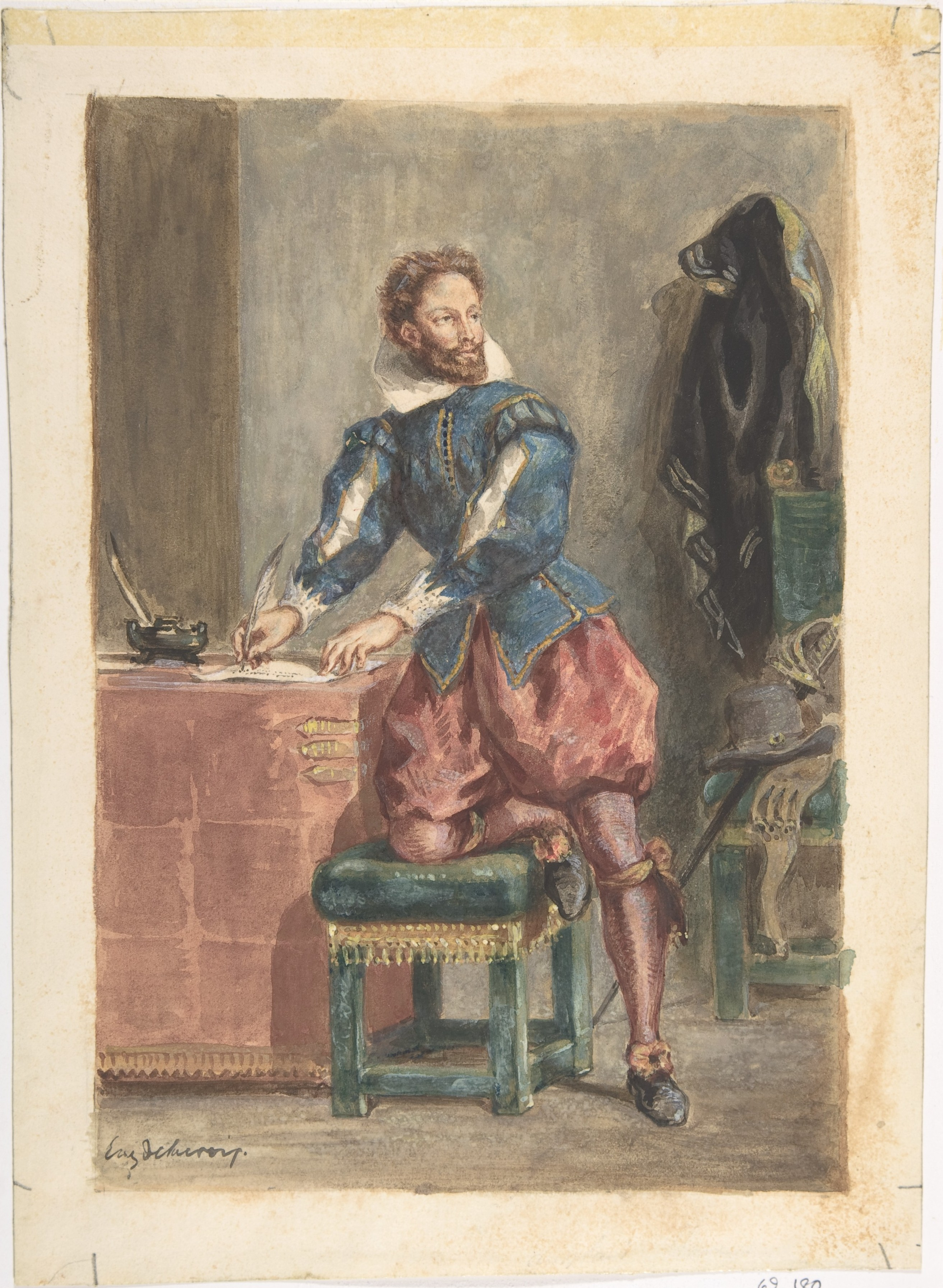
Drawing by Eugène Delacroix.
