= Zalabiye =

Archaeological site in Deir ez-Zor, Syria

- زلبيّة (Arabic)
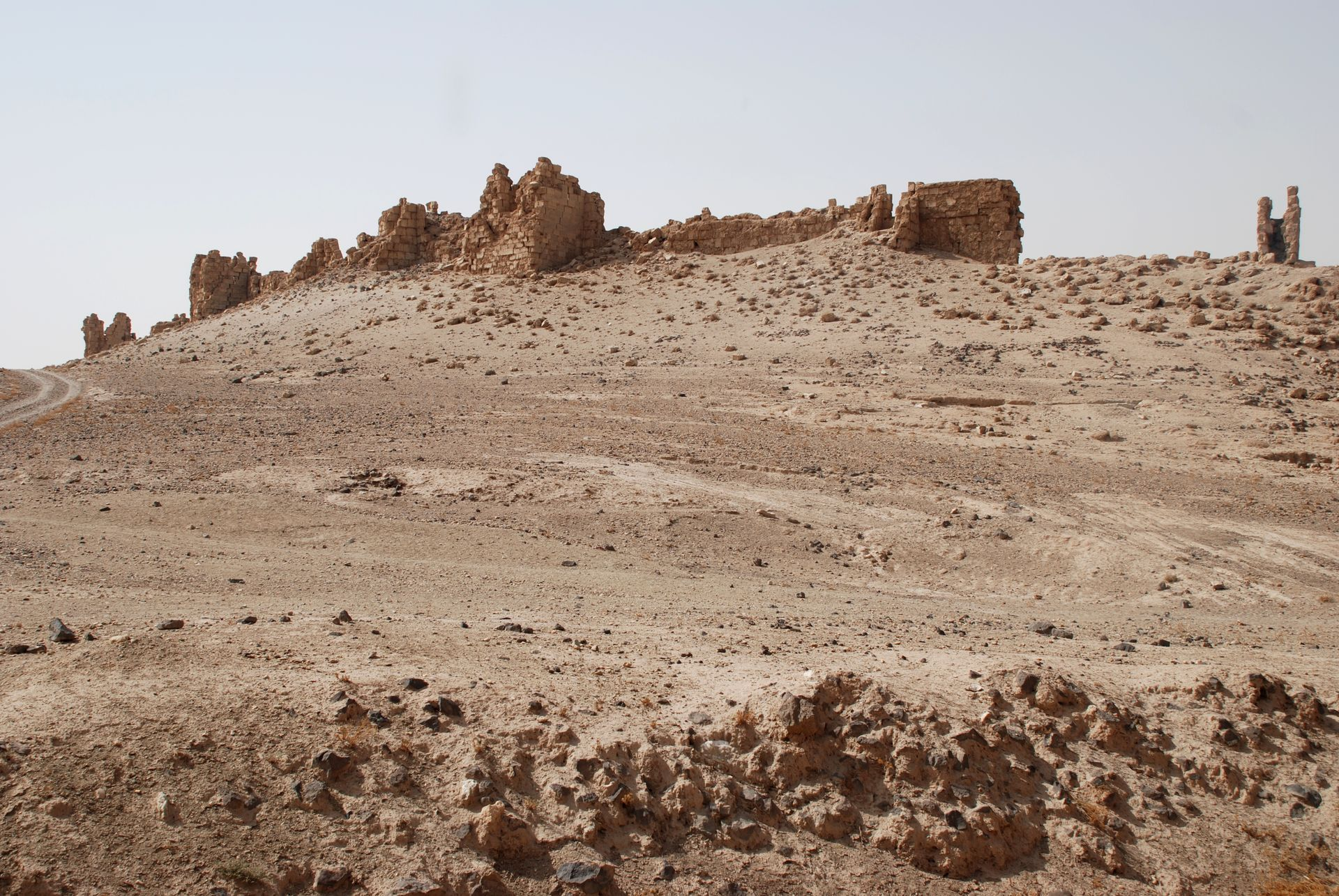
- Zalabiye seen from the northeast

- Location within Syria
- 35.6685°N 39.8425°E
- Type: Fortified town
- Periods: Roman, Byzantine
- Location: Syria
- Region: Deir ez-Zor Governorate

History
- Built: Third century CE

Site notes
- Condition: Ruins
- Management: Directorate-General of Antiquities and Museums
- Public access: Yes

Zalabiye (Arabic: زلبيّة) is an archaeological site on the left bank of the Euphrates in Deir ez-Zor Governorate, Syria.

== Overview ==
The site is located near a narrow gap in the Euphrates Valley that is created by basalt outcrops and that is called al-khanuqa, or "the strangler". On the opposite river bank, some 3 kilometres (1.9 mi) upstream, lies the contemporary fortress of Halabiye. Zalabiye was built during the third century CE when the short-lived Palmyrene Empire, centred on the oasis-city of Palmyra, extended its reach toward the Euphrates area. The fortifications of the site were subsequently improved under the Byzantine Emperor Justinian I (527–565) as part of his program to strengthen the eastern border of the empire.

The site originally had a rectangular shape surrounded by a fortification wall protected by square towers. Due to poor construction, the site has suffered from earthquakes and erosion by the Euphrates. Stones have also been used as ballast for the nearby railway. Today, only the eastern wall with eight towers and a gate remains. Beyond the city walls, on Zalabiye's north and east sides, lay extensive suburbs. Approximately 1 kilometre (0.62 mi) upstream from Zalabiye, a dam had been built in the Euphrates with a diversion canal on the river's right bank. It is thought that the canal was constructed during the first century CE or possibly even during the Late Bronze Age. The Arabs named the canal after legendary queen Semiramis.

The proposed construction of the Halabiye Dam will lead to the flooding of Zalabiye by the dam's reservoir and the Syrian government works with the United Nations Development Programme (UNDP) and UNESCO to limit the impact of the dam on the ancient ruins of Halabiye and Zalabiye.

== See also ==
- Cities of the ancient Near East
- Halabiye
