= Georges-Claude Goiffon =

Georges-Claude de Goiffon (1712 - 1776) was a French architect, son of Jean-Baptiste Goiffon (1658 - 1730), a physician by profession, Georges-Claude was a member of the Académie des sciences, belles-lettres et art de Lyon from 1764 to 1766.

== Biography ==
Georges-Claude de Goiffon, an architect with a scientific as well as a humanistic background, was an advocate of teaching arts and crafts. In this field, he is remembered for his work, which was never published, on the art of weaving entitled Description des arts, dont l'objet est la tissure (the manuscript is kept at the Academy of Lyon, Ms n. 189). As a botanist, he is remembered for compiling the first repertory of Lyon's flora. His best-known publications concern the construction of raw earth (L'art du maçon piseur, 1772) and the method for measuring and drawing horses, written in collaboration with Antoine-François Vincent (1743 - ). L'art du maçon piseur is one of the first technical treatises on earthen construction and in particular on the technique of pisé. During his activity as a teacher of drawing he participated in the formation of the veterinary school of Lyon in the castle of Alfort in 1765 collaborating with the founder Claude Bourgelat (1712 - 1779). In the school Goiffon held the teaching of the artistic anatomy course. In 1755, together with his friend Vincent de Mont-Petit he designed an iron bridge with a single span of about 200 meters. The project was published in Paris in 1783.

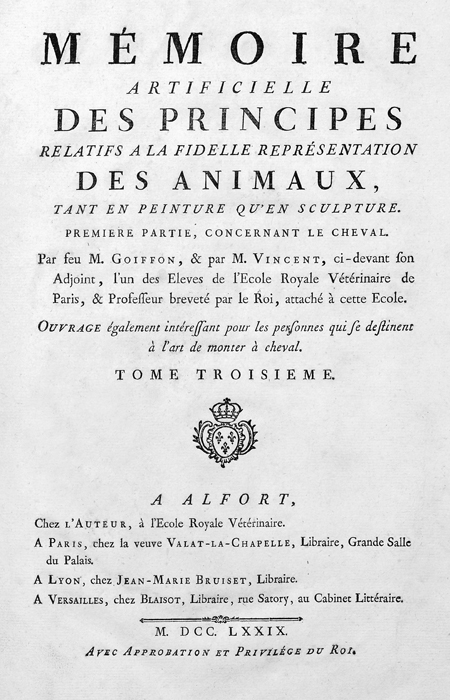
Book title page: Mémoire artificielle des principes relatifs à la fidele représentation des animaux ... Paris, 1779.

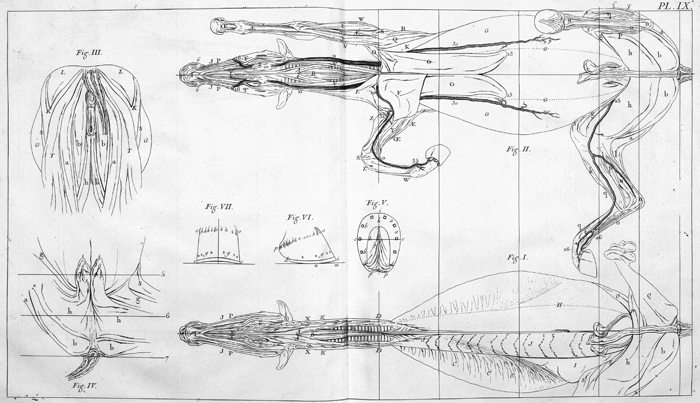
From the book: Mémoire artificielle des principes relatifs à la fidele représentation des animaux ... Paris, 1779.

== Writings ==
- 1768. Georges-Claude de Goiffon. Hippomètre, ou instrument propre à mesurer les chevaux et à juger des dimension et proportions des parties différentes de leurs corps, avec l'explication des moyens de faire usage de cet instrument. Paris: Vallat La Chapelle. Pubblicazione promossa dalla École Royale Vétérinaire di Lione.
- 1772. Georges-Claude de Goiffon. L'art du maçon piseur. Paris: Le Jai.
- 1779. Georges-Claude de Goiffon, Antoine-Françoise Vincent. Mémoire artificielle des principes relatifs à la fidele représentation des animaux, tant en peinture qu'en sculpture. Première partie concernant le cheval, par feu M. Goiffon et par M. Vincent,... Ouvrage également intéressant pour les personnes qui se destinent à l'art de monter à cheval... Paris, Lyons & Versailles: chez l'Auteur.

== Sister projects ==
- Wikimedia Commons contiene immagini o altri file su Georges-Claude Goiffon
