= Jean Lauffray =

French archaeologist (1909–2000)

- Born: Jean Louis Raymond Marie Lauffray; 23 June 1909; Alençon, France
- Died: 5 March 2000 (aged 90); Calvados, France
- Occupations: Architect, archaeologist
- Known for: Excavations in Mari, Byblos, Sidon, and Karnak; restoration of ancient monuments
- Awards: Officier de la Légion d'honneur

Jean Louis Raymond Marie Lauffray (23 June 1909 – 5 March 2000) was a French architect and archaeologist known for his work in the Near East and Egypt, particularly at Mari, Byblos, Sidon, and Karnak.

== Early life and education ==
Lauffray was born in Alençon, France, on 23 June 1909, to Pierre Lauffray and Jeanne Lahaye. He came from an old Norman bourgeois family and was originally intended for a legal career. He studied at the Institut d’Art et d’Archéologie of the Sorbonne, the École du Louvre, and the École nationale supérieure des Beaux-Arts, where he obtained his diploma in architecture. Upon graduation in 1936, he became a licensed architect (DPLG) and earned a degree in letters from the Sorbonne's Institut d'art et d'archéologie.

== Career ==
In 1936, Lauffray joined the French archaeological mission at Mari in Syria under André Parrot as site architect. He later participated in excavations at Malatya, Turkey, with Louis Delaporte in 1939. During his mobilization in Beirut, he collaborated with Maurice Dunand on the excavations of Byblos and surveyed the Roman forum of ancient Berytus for Émir Maurice Chehab, Director of the Lebanese Directorate General of Antiquities. In 1941, he was appointed inspector of antiquities in Lebanon, and from 1942 he was attached to the Aleppo Museum. Between 1944 and 1951, he served as chief architect for the Syrian Antiquities Service, and continued working also in Byblos (from 1947) and Sidon. He also restored Islamic monuments in Aleppo and carried out surveys at Halabiye-Zenobia on the Euphrates.

Lauffray was Professor of Architecture at the École Normale des Beaux-Arts in Beirut in 1950. From 1951 to 1961, he returned to France as architect for the Bâtiments de France at Pau and served as Conservator of the Château de Pau. During this period, he conducted excavations in several Gallo-Roman villas in Aquitaine. In 1961, he was sent to Karnak by Christiane Desroches-Noblecourt to direct the restoration works at the temple complex. Political events led him back to France, where in 1963 he was appointed Maître de recherche at the CNRS and charged with creating the Bureau d’architecture antique d’Aquitaine. In this capacity, he conducted excavations at the Tower of Vesunna in Périgueux and participated in research at Conimbriga, Portugal.

From 1967 to 1980, he served as director of research at CNRS and as founding director of the Centre Franco-Égyptien d’Études des Temples de Karnak. He also undertook missions to Tod, Egypt, for the Louvre Museum. Upon retirement, he focused on publishing his own excavations and completing those of Byblos left unfinished after Maurice Dunand's death in 1987. Lauffray later advised UNESCO as a member of the Commission scientifique internationale for archaeological studies preceding the reconstruction of downtown Beirut.

== Publications ==
Lauffray authored more than fifty reports and scholarly articles. Selected publications include:

- Karnak d’Égypte, domaine du Divin (CNRS, 1980);
- Halabiyya-Zenobia, vol. I–II, Bibliothèque Archéologique et Historique, nos. 119 and 138 (Paris, 1983–1991);
- La tour de Vésone à Périgueux (Gallia Supplement 49, CNRS, 1990);
- La chapelle d’Achoris de Karnak I. L’architecture (ERC, Paris, 1990).

Shortly before his death, he completed the manuscript for Fouilles de Byblos. Tome VI. L’architecture du Proto-urbain (Ancien Bronze) à l’invasion amorite, to be published in the BAH series.

== Death ==
Jean Lauffray died in Calvados on 5 March 2000. He was an Officier of the Légion d'honneur.
