= Bourg-lès-Valence =

- Commune
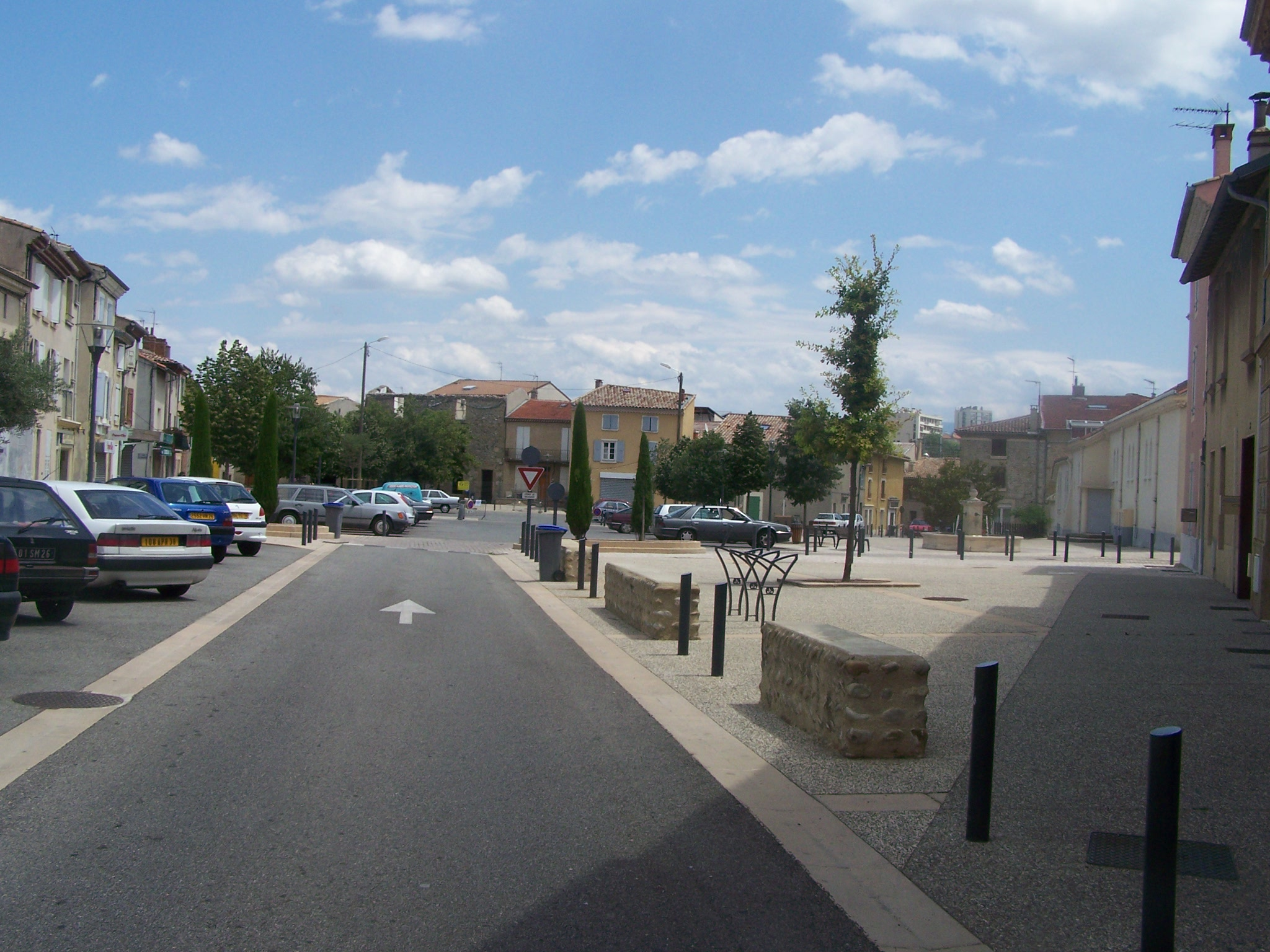
- The centre of Bourg-lès-Valence

- Coat of arms
- Location of Bourg-lès-Valence
- Location within France Location within Auvergne-Rhône-Alpes
- Coordinates: 44°56′55″N 4°53′46″E
- Country: France
- Region: Auvergne-Rhône-Alpes
- Department: Drôme
- Arrondissement: Valence
- Canton: Valence-1
- Intercommunality: CA Valence Romans Agglo

Government
  - Mayor (2020–2026): Marlène Mourier
- Area^{1}: 20.3 km^{2} (7.8 sq mi)
- Highest elevation: 200 m (660 ft)
- Lowest elevation: 99 m (325 ft)
- Population (2023): 19,992
  - Density: 985/km^{2} (2,550/sq mi)
- Time zone: UTC+01:00 (CET)
  - Summer (DST): UTC+02:00 (CEST)
- INSEE/Postal code: 26058 /26500
- Website: https://www.bourg-les-valence.fr/
- ^{1} French Land Register data, which excludes lakes, ponds, glaciers > 1 km^{2} (0.386 sq mi or 247 acres) and river estuaries.

Bourg-lès-Valence (French pronunciation: [buʁ lɛ valɑ̃s]; Occitan: Lo Borg de Valença) is a commune in the Drôme department in southeastern France. It is a suburb of Valence. The archaeologist and Hellenist Fernand Courby (1878–1932) was born in Bourg-lès-Valence.

In 2014–2019, Bourg-lès-Valence was twinned with the town of Shusha (Shushi) of the de facto independent Nagorno-Karabakh Republic, but de jure part of Azerbaijan. In 2019, the administrative court of Grenoble declared the partnership treaty null and void due to the municipality having exceeded its power by unilaterally signing it and France's non-recognition of the de facto state.

== Population ==
Historical population

Year	Pop.	±% p.a.
1793	2,072	—
1800	2,086	+0.10%
1806	1,900	−1.54%
1821	2,647	+2.24%
1831	2,820	+0.64%
1836	2,898	+0.55%
1841	3,059	+1.09%
1846	3,110	+0.33%
1851	2,870	−1.59%
1856	3,057	+1.27%
1861	3,276	+1.39%
1866	3,615	+1.99%
1872	3,536	−0.37%
1876	3,757	+1.53%
1881	3,572	−1.00%
1886	3,995	+2.26%
1891	3,928	−0.34%
1896	4,336	+2.00%
1901	4,436	+0.46%

Year	Pop.	±% p.a.
1906	4,750	+1.38%
1911	5,072	+1.32%
1921	5,241	+0.33%
1926	5,869	+2.29%
1931	6,471	+1.97%
1936	6,772	+0.91%
1946	7,662	+1.24%
1954	8,348	+1.08%
1962	10,856	+3.34%
1968	12,812	+2.80%
1975	15,616	+2.87%
1982	16,033	+0.38%
1990	18,230	+1.62%
1999	18,347	+0.07%
2007	18,351	+0.00%
2012	19,305	+1.02%
2017	19,975	+0.68%
2023	19,992	+0.01%

Source: EHESS and INSEE (1968–2023)

== See also ==
- Communes of the Drôme department
