= Joseph D'Aquin =

French pioneer of psychiatry (1732–1815)

- Born: 14 January 1732; Chambéry, Savoy
- Died: 11 July 1815 (aged 83)
- Education: University of Turin
- Scientific career
- Fields: Psychiatry

Joseph D'Aquin (14 January 1732 – 11 July 1815) was an early pioneer in the field of psychiatry.

== Biography ==
Joseph D'Aquin (or Daquin) was born in 1732 in Chambéry, in the duchy of Savoy, part of the Kingdom of Sardinia. He attended medical school at the University of Turin, where he graduated in 1757. He also studied at Montpellier and Paris. In 1791, he published a book entitled Philosophy of madness, which some consider the first book in the field of psychiatry. However, his recognition has been limited by the fact that Philippe Pinel never cited the work of Joseph D'Aquin in his famous medical and philosophical Traité médico-philosophique sur l'aliénation mentale; ou la manie published in 1801.

== Literary works ==
- À ses Concitoyens (de vaccine...), 13 pages
- Analyse des eaux thermales d'Aix en Savoye (Thermal waters analysis of Aix in Savoy), 1772, published by F. Gorrin
- Analyse des prétendues eaux ferrugineuses de la Boisse, situées près de Chambéry, 1777, published by J. Lullin, 35 pages
- Topographie medicale de la ville de Chambery et de ses environs (Medical topography of the city of Chambery and its environs), 1787, published by F. Gorrin, 151 pages
- Défense de la topographie médicale de Chambery, 1788, published by F. Gorrin, 58 pages
- La Philosophie de la folie (The philosophy of madness), 1791, First edition.
- La Philosophie de la folie (The philosophy of madness), 1804, Second edition dedicated to Philippe Pinel.
- Des eaux thermales d'Aix dans le département du Mont-Blanc: de leurs vertus médicales.. (Thermal waters of Aix in the Mont Blanc region: their medical virtues...), 1808, published by P. Cléaz, 369 pages

== Tributes and awards ==
- Member of the Academy of Sciences, Humanities and Arts of Lyon
- Member of the Agricultural Society of Turin
- Permanent Secretary of the Agricultural Society of Chambéry
- Correspondent of the Royal Society of Medicine in Paris, which awarded J. D'Aquin a gold medal for his work entitled "Medical Topography of the city of Chambéry and its environs" published in 1787.
