= Maya Haïdar Boustani =

- Known for: Curatorship of the Museum of Lebanese Prehistory, Archaeology
- Scientific career
- Fields: Archaeology

Maya Abdallah Haïdar-Boustani is a Lebanese archaeologist and curator of the Museum of Lebanese Prehistory at Saint Joseph University, Beirut.

== Biography ==
Maya Haïdar-Boustani obtained her doctorate and currently holds several notable positions as a research assistant at the Museum of Lebanese Prehistory as well as a lecturer at the Saint Joseph University on prehistory and archaeology. She is also a research associate for the Archéorient Laboratory, UMR 5133, Maison de l'Orient et de la Méditerranée, Lyon, France and also for the Instituto Internacional de Investigaciones Prehistóricas de Cantabria, University of Cantabria, Santander, Spain. She is also a member of the editorial board of a journal called Tempora: Annales of History and Archaeology published by the Saint Joseph University. She lectures on a variety of topics specialising in the prehistory of the Near East. Her current research includes materials procurement and distribution in the Neolithic, and the Neolithic development of Lebanon and Syria.

== Fieldwork ==
In 2001 she was part of an Anglo-Lebanese mission of the Council for British Research in the Levant and the Museum of Lebanese Prehistory led by Alex Wasse and Lévon Nordigiuan to excavate at Nachcharini and survey in the Anti-Lebanon. In 2002 she carried out reconnaissance surveys in the Beqaa Valley, in collaboration with J.J. Ibañez of the University of Cantabria, Spain. In 2002 and 2003 she conducted excavations in the upper valley of Nahr Ibrahim, as part of the joint mission of the Saint Joseph University and the Directorate General of Antiquities of Lebanon, in collaboration with the Fernand Courby Institute, the Maison de l'Orient et de la Méditerranée. in 2004 she was involved in excavations in the fields below Tell Arqa as part of the French mission of the University of Paris 1 Pantheon-Sorbonne led by J.P. Thalmann. Since 2004, Boustani has been co-director of the Syrian-Lebanese-Spanish archaeological mission carrying out surveys west of Homs.

== Talks, exhibitions and conferences ==
She has spoken at various international conferences and lectures on subjects such as "The Neolithic of Lebanon, stock of knowledge" in June 2001 as part of the "Lundis des franciscaines " conference circuit. In September 2001 she spoke on "Flint Workshops of the southern Beqaa Valley (Lebanon): Preliminary results from Qaraoun" at a conference called "Neolithic Revolution. New perspectives on southwest Asia in light of recent discoveries in Cyprus", organized by the Council for British Research in the Levant and the Department of Antiquities in Cyprus. In April 2003 she gave a lecture entitled "The neolithic lumberjacks" as part of a series organized by the Museum of Lebanese Prehistory on the Archaeology of Lebanon entitled "Time, prehistory, Lebanon : cave, village, city". In June 2004 as part of a lecture series entitled "doctoriales 2004" organized by the Institut français du Proche-Orient and the Directorate General of Antiquities of Lebanon, she spoke on "The size of the workshops in the Beqaa". In 2004 and 2005 she spoke to the 5th International Congress on the Archaeology of the Ancient Near East in Madrid on the survey in Homs. In 2006 she spoke on "The Jesuits, pioneers of Lebanese Prehistory" as part of the Founders Day celebrations at Saint Joseph University. In May 2009 she gave a lecture on "New archaeological discoveries in the Homs Gap" as part of a Museum conference. She has also organized an exhibition of the work of Henri Fleisch, highlighting the rapid destruction of Lebanese prehistory in 2010.

== Selected bibliography ==
- Haïdar Boustani, M., Jacques Cauvin et le Néolithique du Liban (1930–2001). Tempora (Annales d’Histoire et d’Archéologie, Université Saint-Joseph, Beyrouth), vol. 10-11, p. 181-185, 2003.
- Haïdar Boustani, M., Le Néolithique du Liban dans le contexte proche-oriental. État des connaissances. Tempora (Annales d’Histoire et d’Archéologie, Université Saint-Joseph, Beyrouth), vol. 12-13 (années 2001-2002), p. 1-39, 2004.
- Haïdar Boustani, M., Flint workshops of the Southern Beqaa valley (Lebanon): preliminary results from Qaraoun. In: PELTENBERG E. and WASSE A. (eds.), The Neolithic Revolution. New perspectives on Southwest Asia in light of recent discoveries on Cyprus. Papers from a conference organized by the Council for British Research in the Levant in collaboration with the Department of Antiquities. 20 to 23 September 2001, Droushia village, Cyprus. Levant Supplementary Series 1. Oxbow Books, Oxford. pp. 133–144, 2004.
- Haïdar Boustani, M., Un objet néolithique en forme de pied humain à Labwé (Liban). Syria 83 : 139-146, 2006.
- Haïdar Boustani, M., à paraître, Les jésuites pionniers de la préhistoire libanaise. Mélanges de l’Université Saint-Joseph.
- Haïdar Boustani, M. et Yazbeck C., Le Musée de Préhistoire libanaise, La Revue Pédagogique publiée par le Centre de Recherche et de Développement Pédagogiques, Ministère de l’Education et de l’Enseignement supérieur, Liban (article en arabe), N°35, Octobre 2005, p. 49-54.
- Garrard, A. Pirie A., Schroeder B. and Wasse A. with contributions by Clarke J., Haïdar Boustani, M., Rhodes, S. and Yazbeck C., Survey of Nahcharini Cave and the prehistoric settlement in the Northern Anti-Lebanon highlands. Bulletin d’Archéologie et d’Architecture libanaises 7 : 15-48, 2003.
- Gatier P.L., Charpentier G., Haïdar Boustani, M., Harfouche, R., Mercier, F., Pieri, D., Poupet, P. et Zaven T., Mission de Yanouh et de la haute vallée du Nahr Ibrahim. Rapport préliminaire 2002. Bulletin d’Archéologie et d’Architecture libanaises 6 : 211-255, 2004.
- Hajar L., Haïdar Boustani, M., Khater, C., and Cheddadi, R., Environment changes in Lebanon during the Holocene : Man vs climate impacts, The Journal of Arid Environments XXX : 1-10, 2009.
- La préhistoire, in : Atlas du Liban, Seconde édition revue et augmentée, Presses de l’Université Saint-Joseph, 2006.

Archaeological Reports from work in the Homs Gap

- Haïdar Boustani, M., Ibáñez J.J., Al-Maqdissi M., Angel Armendarz A., Gonzalez Urquijo, J. and Teira, L., Prospections archéologiques à l’Ouest de la ville de Homs : rapport préliminaire, campagne 2004. Tempora (Annales d’Histoire et d’Archéologie, Université Saint-Joseph, Beyrouth), vol. 14-15 (années 2003-2004), p. 59-91, 2005.
- Haïdar Boustani, M., Ibáñez J.J., Al-Maqdissi M., Angel Armendarz A., Gonzalez Urquijo, J. and Teira, L., New data on the Epipalaeolithic and Neolithic of the Homs Gap: Three campaigns of archaeological survey (2004–2006). Neo-Lithics 1/07: 3-9, 2007.
- Haïdar Boustani, M., Ibáñez J.J., Al-Maqdissi M., Angel Armendarz A., Gonzalez Urquijo, J. and Teira, L., Prospections archéologiques à l’Ouest de la ville de Homs : rapport préliminaire, campagne 2005. Tempora (Annales d’Histoire et d’Archéologie, Université Saint-Joseph, Beyrouth), vol. 16-17 (2005–2006), p. 9-38, 2008.
- Haïdar Boustani, M., Ibáñez J.J., Al-Maqdissi M., Angel Armendarz A., Gonzalez Urquijo, J. and Teira, L., Rodriguez, A., Terradas, X., Boix, J., Tapia, J. and Sabreen, E., Prospections archéologiques à l’Ouest de la ville de Homs : rapport préliminaire, campagnes 2006-2007. Tempora (Annales d’Histoire et d’Archéologie, Université Saint-Joseph, Beyrouth), vol. 18 (années 2007-2009), p. 7-49, 2009.
- Haïdar Boustani, M., Ibáñez J.J., Al-Maqdissi M., Angel Armendarz A., Gonzalez Urquijo, J. and Teira, L., Archaeological survey in the Homs Gap (Syria). Campaigns of 2004 and 2005. Actes du 5th International Congress on the Archaeology of the Ancient Near East, Madrid, April 3–8, 2006.
- Haïdar Boustani, M., Ibáñez J.J., Al-Maqdissi M., Angel Armendarz A., Gonzalez Urquijo, J. and Teira, L., The megalithic necropolises at the West of Homs (Syria), In: STEIMER-HERBET T., Pierres levées et stèles anthropomorphes. Colloque International, Amman 15-17 juin 2007.

Work in progress

- Participation in the publication of the final body of work of the mission Syrian-Lebanese-Spanish surveys west of Homs.

Articles in preparation

- Workshops of the Beqaa in the Neolithic.
- Lithic studies from the surveys around Tell Arqa.
- Study of lithic material from the work of the German mission to Baalbek, German Institute of Archaeology DAI-Orient-Abteilung, Berlin.
