= Academy of Lyon =

French learned society

- Academy of Sciences, Humanities and Arts of Lyon
- Académie des sciences, belles-lettres et arts de Lyon
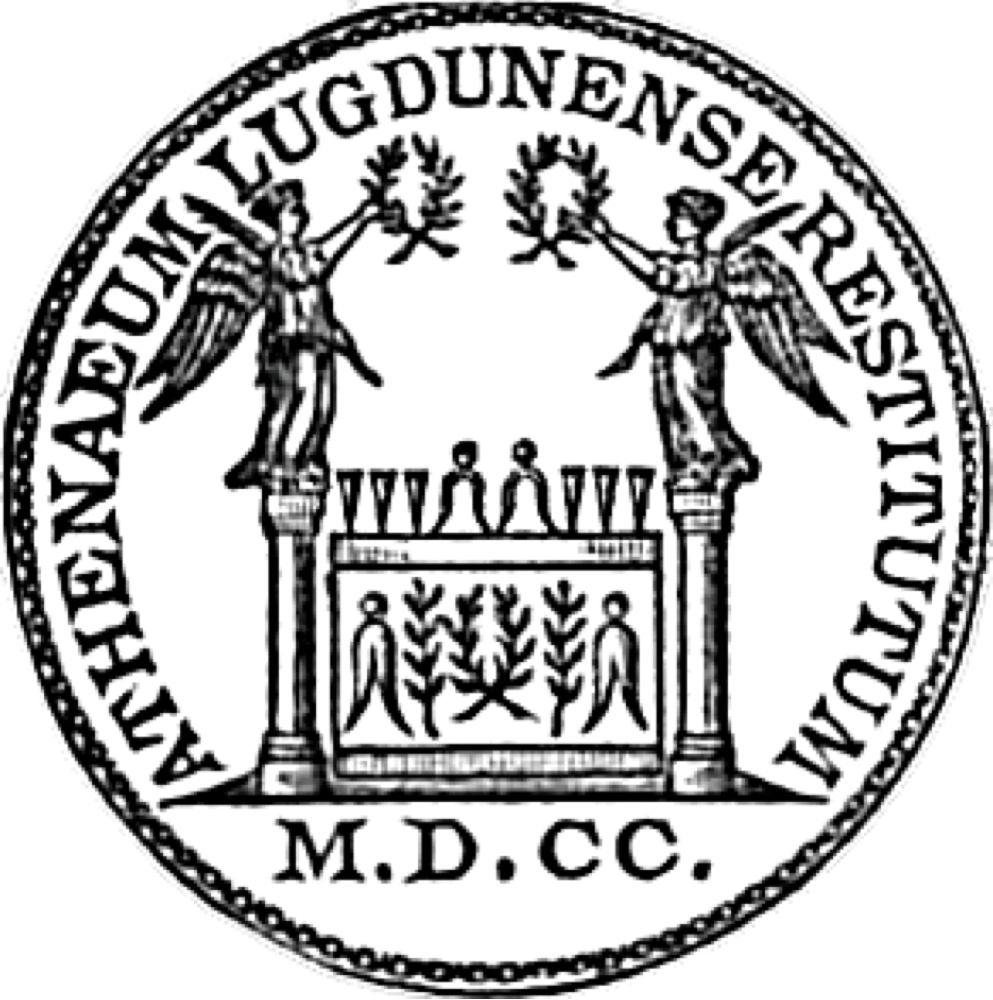
- Seal of the Academy
- Formation: 1700; 326 years ago
- Founder: Claude Brossette; Laurent Dugas de Bois Saint-Just; Camille Falconet; Louis de Puget; Thomas Bernard Fellon; Antoine de Serre; Jean de Saint-Bonnet
- Founded at: Lyon, Kingdom of France
- Type: Learned society
- Headquarters: Palais Saint-Jean, 4 Av. Adolphe Max, 69005 Lyon, France
- Coordinates: 45°45′37″N 4°49′41″E
- Fields: Archaeology, arts, art history, history, literature & science
- Members: 52, elected by peers
- Official language: French
- Affiliations: Comité des travaux historiques et scientifiques & Conférence nationale des académies des sciences, lettres et arts

The Academy of Sciences, Humanities and Arts of Lyon (French: Académie des Sciences, Belles-Lettres et Arts de Lyon) is a French learned society founded in 1700. Its founders included:

- Claude Brossette, lawyer, alderman of Lyons, and administrator of the Hôtel-Dieu de Lyon;
- Laurent Dugas de Bois Saint-Just, President of the Cour des monnaies;
- Camille Falconet, future consulting physician of King Louis XIV and member of the Académie des Inscriptions et Belles-Lettres;
- Antoine de Serre, adviser to the Cour des monnaies;
- Louis de Puget, naturalist;
- Father Jean de Saint-Bonnet, (Note: Apparently a different figure than Jean de Saint-Bonnet) professor at the Collège-lycée Ampère.
- Thomas Bernard Fellon.

== Notable Members ==
- Joseph D'Aquin
- Jean Pouilloux

== See also ==
- French art salons and academies
