= Isidore the Younger =

Byzantine architect (fl. c. 510 – 563)

Isidore of Miletus the Younger or simply Isidore the Younger (fl. c. 510 – 563) was a Byzantine architect and a nephew of the architect Isidore of Miletus. Like his uncle, he was a native of Miletus.

According to Procopius' Buildings, Isidore in his early days collaborated with another young architect, John of Constantinople, on the fortifications of Zenobia. This work including constructing churches, barracks and baths. This work took place during the reign of Justinian I (527–565).

At Chalcis ad Belum, one inscription dated to 550 and another from about that time mention an engineer named Isidore and are commonly associated with Isidore the Younger. The inscriptions, found in two houses, call Isidore a mechanikos and a vir illustris.

According to Procopius, when the dome of the Hagia Sophia designed by the elder Isidore collapsed following an earthquake in 557, Isidore supervised its repair. He is described as the mechanopoios. The new dome was consecrated on 24 December 562. According to Agathias, it was less awesome than the first but 6 metres (20 ft) taller. The reconstruction is also recorded in Paul the Silentiary, Theophanes the Confessor and John Malalas. Compared with the later restorations of the dome in 986–994 by Trdat and in 1347–1354, the work of Isidore shows exceptional precision and workmanship. Twelve ribs from his restoration remain in the present building.

According to Constantine of Rhodes, writing in the 9th century, Isidore helped design the Church of the Holy Apostles for the Justinian.

== Bibliography ==
- Kourelis, Kostis (2008). "Isidōros the Younger (ca 510 – 563 CE)". In Paul T. Keyser; Georgia L. Irby-Massie (eds.). The Encyclopedia of Ancient Natural Scientists: The Greek Tradition and Its Many Heirs. Routledge. pp. 442–443.
- Loerke, William; Johnson, Mark J. (1991). "Isidore the Younger". In Kazhdan, Alexander (ed.). The Oxford Dictionary of Byzantium. Vol. 2. Oxford and New York: Oxford University Press. p. 1017. ISBN 0-19-504652-8.
- Martindale, John R., ed. (1992). The Prosopography of the Later Roman Empire: Volume III, AD 527–641. Cambridge: Cambridge University Press. ISBN 0-521-20160-8.
- Rizos, Efthymios (2018). "Isidore of Miletus the Younger". In Nicholson, Oliver (ed.). The Oxford Dictionary of Late Antiquity, Volume 1: A–I. Oxford: Oxford University Press. p. 790. ISBN 978-0-19-881624-9.
