= International Institute for Prehistoric Research of Cantabria =

The International Institute for Prehistoric Research of Cantabria (Instituto Internacional de Investigaciones Prehistóricas de Cantabria) is a university research institute of mixed character, created by the University of Cantabria on 29 April 2004. It is sponsored by the University of Cantabria, the Government of Cantabria and the Spanish Santander central bank (Banco Santander Central Hispano). Since 2004 it has been an associated unit of the National Research Council (Institute of History at Madrid, and Institución Milá y Fontanals at Barcelona.

The current director is Manuel Ramón González Morales.

The Institute is dedicated to prehistoric research, both of basic and applied and provides technical advice within this field. A recent five-year plan (2003-2007) has defined its subject areas of focus:

- Prehistoric Art
- Paleolithic of southwest Europe
- Origin and development of rural societies
- Prehistoric Technology

Since 2005, the IIIPC has published a journal called "Monographs of the Cantabria International Institute for Prehistoric Research" (Monografías del Instituto Internacional de Investigaciones Prehistóricas de Cantabria) with the technical support of the University of Cantabria Publications Service. This aims to disseminate the results of investigations and scientific output of the Institute in the field of prehistory.
