= Maison de l'Orient et de la Méditerranée =

Research body in Lyon, France

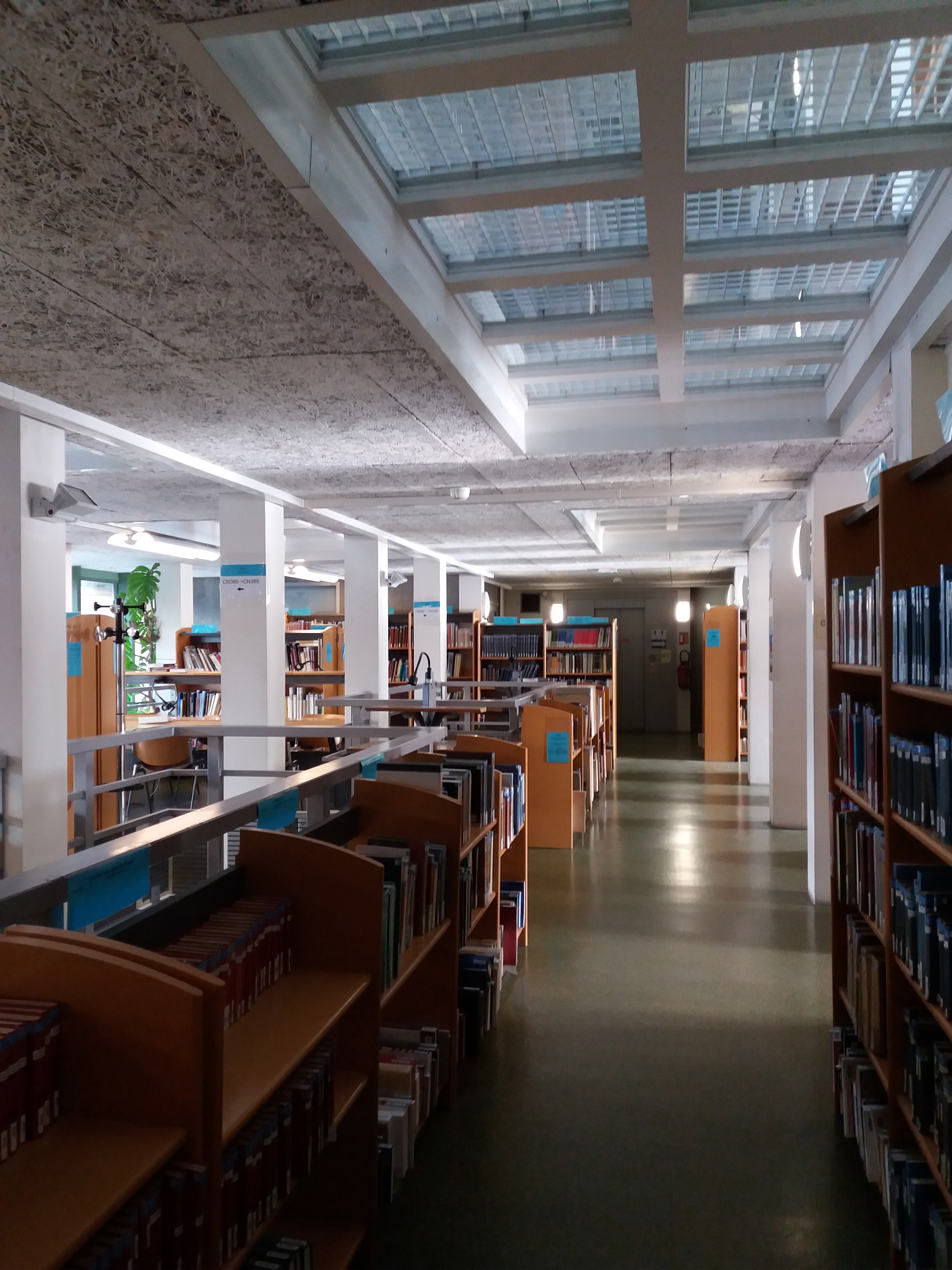
Maison de l'Orient et de la Méditerranée - Étage

The Maison de l'Orient et de la Méditerranée (or MOM) is a research body in Lyon, France, that specialises in the Mediterranean and the Middle East and the first steps of humanity. It is dedicated to its founder, historian Jean Pouilloux.

== Staff ==
Anne Schmitt, CNRS, took over directorship from Rémy Boucharlat on 1 January 2011 and conducts research programs within the Archéométrie et archéologie laboratory - UMR 5138 of the MOM. Nathalie Donjon has served as secretary general since 2007, after being recruited in 1988 and attached to the CNRS research administration.

== History ==
Founded in 1975, MOM's activity has been characterised by a multidisciplinary working approach. It employs 350 people including archaeologists, epigraphists, historians, with the help of physicists, chemists and geologists. Geographers, political scientists and architects are also part of the team. MOM is classed as a research federation involving five joint research units (UMR) of CNRS and two other university teams. This federation is linked to the Lumière University Lyon 2 and is especially concerned with historico-morphological studies. MOM has also created an online application, an atlas of near east archaeological sites 14000 to 5700 BP, presenting work by a large number of archaeologists.

== Research units ==
- HiSoMA, History and Sources of the ancient world: UMR 5189 CNRS.
- Archéorient, Environments and societies of the ancient East: UMR 5133 CNRS.
- GREMMO, Group Research and Studies on the Mediterranean and the Middle East: UMR 5195 CNRS.
- Archaeometry and Archaeology, originally dating and Materials Technology: HiSoMA-UMR 5138 CNRS.
- APRI, Institute of Research onancient architecture: UMR 6222 CNRS, Lyon office.
- Romanitas: Young team 2409.
- Centre Jean Palerne: host team 3067, Saint-Étienne.
