= Fernand Courby =

French archaeologist and Hellenist (1878–1932)

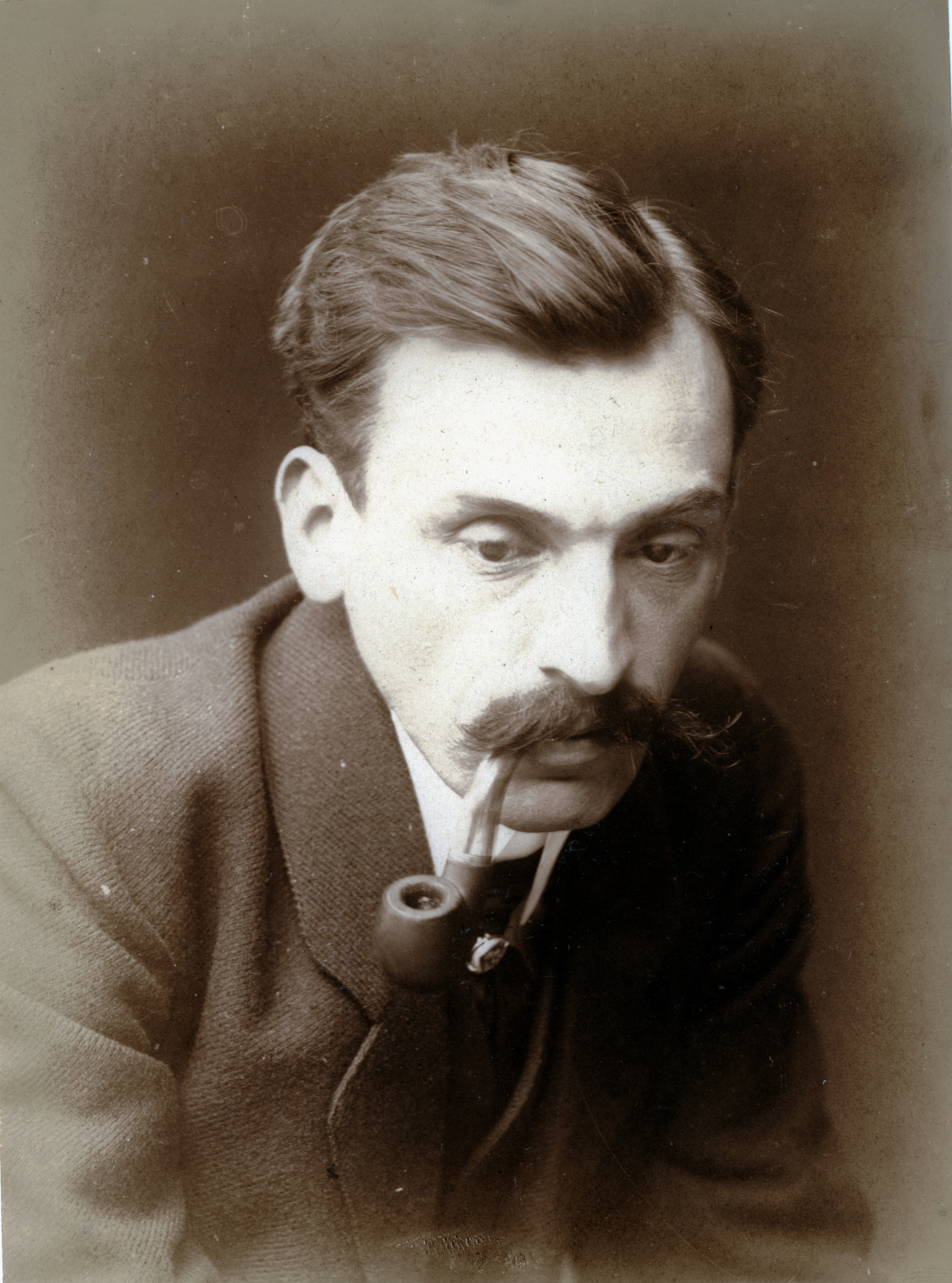
- Courby in 1910
- Born: Fernand Henri Fabien Courby; 19 January 1878; Bourg-lès-Valence
- Died: 6 March 1932 (aged 54); Lyon
- Occupations: Archaeologist; Hellenist

Fernand Henri Fabien Courby (19 January 1878 – 6 March 1932) was a French archaeologist and Hellenist, a specialist of ancient Greece, a member of the French School at Athens (class 1905), and professor at the Faculté des lettres of the University of Lyon.

== Biography ==
Born into a modest family of Valence in the Drôme department where his father ran a machine shop, Fernand Courby experienced from childhood the desire to translate through drawing the expression of his thought. A brilliant student in high school in Valence, then a scholarship holder for license and agrégation at the Faculty of Arts of Lyon, he was formed by the teaching of Henri Lechat, Maurice Holleaux and Philippe-Ernest Legrand and chosen to be a member of the French School at Athens in 1905.

After a stay at the Académie de France in Rome (Villa Medici), he joined the archaeological sites of Delos and Delphi under the leadership of Maurice Holleaux. An archaeologist, designer, and expert in architecture, he was the type of archaeologist-architect that was missing in the French School at Athens, and contributed to a change in French methods in archeology.

At Delos, he became interested in 1906 in the proto-history of the sanctuary, unearthed the Portico Antigone with one of the tombs of the Hyperborean Virgins (the Theke), and discovered the remains of a Minoan and Mycenaean Delos in the sanctuary of Apollo and Artemis. With Charles Picard, he prepared the enhancement of the excavations of the city and the Temple of Zeus by a mission to Stratos (Acarnania). At Delphi, his studies on the tholos of the Sicycone Treasury, the east pediment of the archaic temple on the nearby monument of the opisthodomos, and especially the terrace of the temple renewed the knowledge of Delphic monuments.

Mobilized in 1914 and assigned in 1915 to the 176th Infantry Regiment, it was in the uniform of an adjutant (and under Turkish fire) that he participated in the development of Macedonia excavations, especially the necropolis of Elaeus in Thrace, unearthed during work entrenchment in the Dardanelles in early June 1915. He cumulated these archaeological activities with the function of officer-interpreter by the 2nd office of the General Staff of the Armies of the East in Salonika. His role in the development of the victorious offensive which forced Bulgaria to ask for an armistice on September 29, 1918 earned him the Greek Medal of Military Merit and the French Croix de Guerre with citation to the order of the Eastern Army.

As soon as 1919, resuming the publication of the monuments of the terrace of the temple of Apollo at Delphi interrupted by the war, he undertook a comprehensive study of the altar of Pythian Apollo.

It was in Delos that Fernand Courby started his study on Les vases grecs à reliefs (from prehistoric to Roman times), which he made the subject of his doctoral thesis published in 1922. This book of reference on the pottery of ancient Greece earned him the medal of the Institut de France in 1926.

Appointed a professor of Greek philology and epigraphy at the University of Lyon in 1922, Fernand Courby founded in 1923 the Institut d'épigraphie grecque, which in 1961 took the name Institut Fernand Courby (a laboratory of the CNRS since 1967).

In 1931, Fernand Courby published his last book on Delos, Les temples d'Apollon. Surgery was performed too late for a mastoiditis and he died of meningitis on March 6, 1932, aged 54.

At the time of his death he was preparing a study on Greek house for the series La vie publique et privée des anciens Grecs (Collection Budé). He was twice holder of the Grand silver medal of the Société centrale des architectes français.

Left a widower in 1914 with two young daughters, Anne (born in 1912) and Irène (born 1914), Fernand Courby remarried in 1922 with the daughter of the Hellenist Fernand Allègre, with whom he had a daughter, Françoise (born 1924).
