= Claude Brossette =

French lawyer and writer

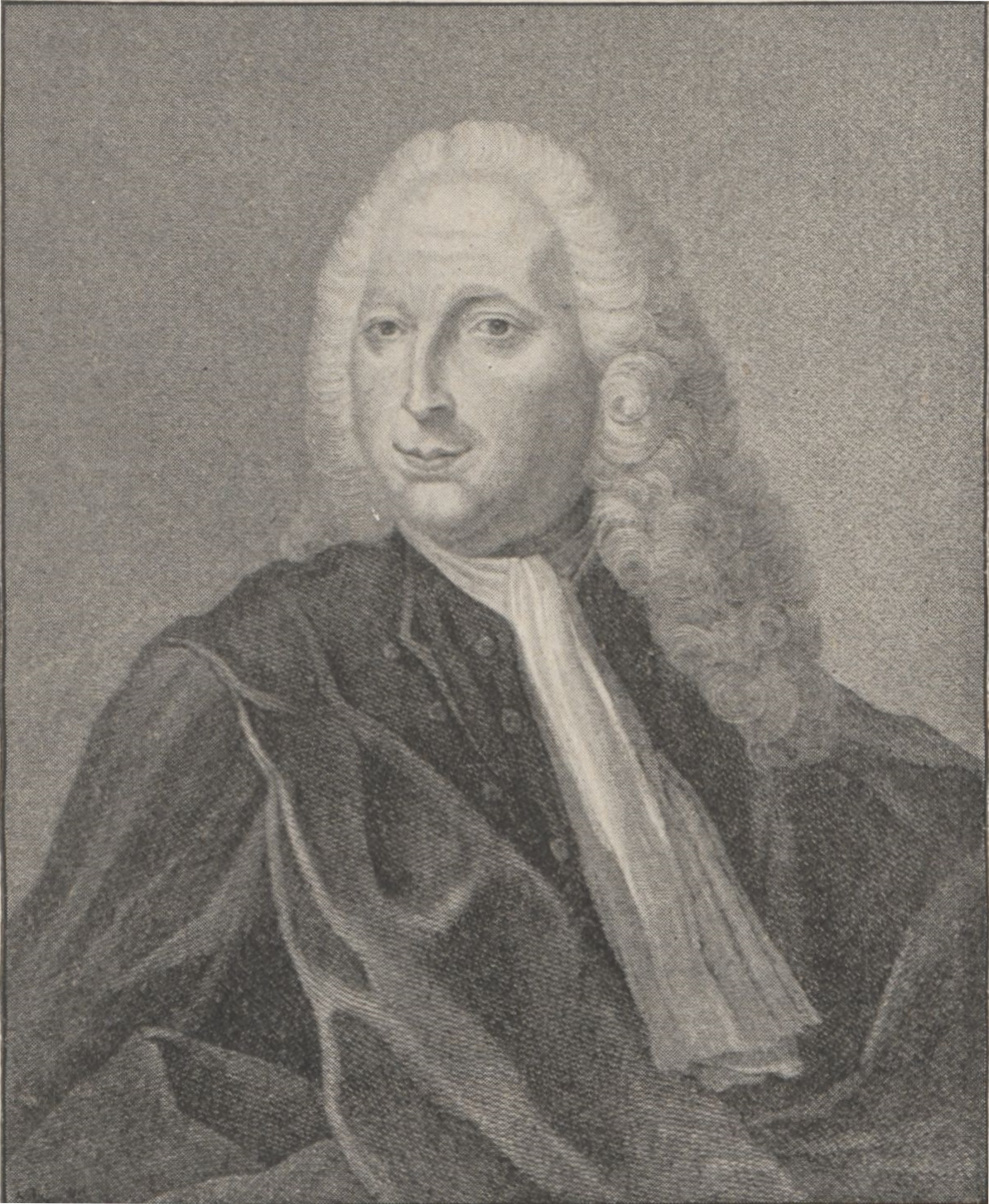
A portrait of Claude Brossette

Claude Brossette, seigneur de Varennes d'Appetour (born 7 or 8 November 1671, Theizé - died 18 June 1743, Lyonnais) was a French lawyer, writer and academic. He was a prominent figure in Lyon’s cultural and legal life in the early 18th century and contributed significantly to the provincial intellectual network of the Enlightenment.

== Biography ==
Claude Brossette was educated at the Collège de la Trinité in Lyon and joined the Jesuits before turning to law.

He practiced as a lawyer at the Parlement of Paris before serving as avocat général in Lyon. He held several administrative positions, including administrator of the Hôtel-Dieu (1722–1724), rector of the Hôpital de la Charité in Lyon (1727), and alderman of the city of Lyon (1730–1731). In 1700 he founded the Académie des Sciences, Arts et Belles-Lettres de Lyon, where he remained a bibliothecarian until 1743, and whose secretary he was appointed in 1724.

In 1706, at age 35, he married Marguerite Chavagny. The couple had two sons and two daughters. His wife died in 1716, The family primarily resided not at Rapetour, but in the village house known as Beauvallon.

Brossette authored works on law and produced several editions. He maintained an extensive correspondence with Academy President Bouhier, Abbot Olivet and Father Vanière from Toulouse. Between 1699 and 1710 he was a regular correspondent of Paris poet and satirist Boileau, whose works he edited with commentaries. Their correspondence was published in 1770 by François Louis Cizeron Rival. He was acquainted with François de Lamoignon and Bernard de La Monnoye from the Académie Française, and with Jean-Baptiste Rousseau. Later his reach widened; he exchanged point of views with Voltaire, Louis Racine, Abbot Lenglet-Dufresnoy, Déon, and Father Brumoy.

== Personality and Influence ==
Although Brossette is no longer widely known beyond specialized scholarship, he represents the type of provincial intellectual whose work contributed to the development of Enlightenment thought in the eighteenth century. His surviving correspondence—some of which remains unpublished—highlights his combined roles as a lawyer, an administrator involved in charitable activities, and a committed participant in literary culture.

Brossette was also a prominent member of the Lyon bar and an active philanthropist. He served as an administrator of the Hôtel-Dieu and later as rector of the Hôpital de la Charité in Lyon. In addition, he was the founder and, for four decades, the perpetual secretary of the Académie de Lyon, one of the provincial academies that contributed to extending the activities of the Republic of Letters beyond Paris. A comparable institution, the Académie of Dijon, notably enabled Jean-Jacques Rousseau to compose his first major work and gain recognition by responding to a prize competition in 1751.

Alongside his editions of poets, a number of documents by Claude Brossette have been preserved, including correspondence with learned figures such as François Bottu de La Barmondière Saint-Fonds and Laurent Dugas, as well as exchanges with Boileau and a lesser-known correspondence with the lyric poet Jean-Baptiste Rousseau. These materials illustrate his role as an intermediary in literary networks and provide insight into literary life outside Paris and within European courts.

An account of this intellectually active life was given by François-Louis Cizeron-Rival, who owned Brossette’s papers and produced the first edition of his correspondence with Boileau. According to Samy Ben Messaoud, these archives remain insufficiently studied and represent an important source for understanding both the cultural life of Lyon and the social worlds of eighteenth-century jurists and scholars.

== Works ==
- Histoire Abrégée ou éloge historique de la ville de Lyon, 1711
- Editions of Boileau, Molière
