= Directorate-General of Antiquities and Museums =

Directorate-General for Antiquities and Museums المديرية العامة للآثار والمتاحف
Agency overview
- Formed: 1946
- Jurisdiction: Syria
- Headquarters: Damascus
- Agency executive: Mohammad Nazir Awad, Director-General
- Parent department: Ministry of Culture
- Parent agency: Government of Syria
- Website: www.dgam.gov.sy

The Directorate-General for Antiquities and Museums (DGAM); Arabic: المديرية العامة للآثار والمتاحف) is a Syrian government-owned agency that is responsible for the protection, promotion and excavation activities in all sites of national heritage in the country. The Directorate was established shortly after Syria's independence in 1946 under the central supervision of the Ministry of Culture.

== General overview ==
Its tasks emerged during the first years of independence in discovering, preserving, and protecting the data of the Syrian heritage, conducting studies on archaeological finds, and drafting the laws governing this, which were mentioned in the antiquities law and its amendments.

With the development of archaeological work and the increase in discoveries, its tasks expanded and its scientific and administrative responsibilities multiplied to include all cities and regions in the Syrian Arab Republic.

The progress of archaeological work in the country and highlighting the features of the Syrian civilization.

Nationally: through the rehabilitation of archaeological sites, museum management, seminars, conferences, publications, and publications of a historical and archaeological nature.

Internationally: Through archaeological exhibitions and various international participations through archaeological conferences and forums, and according to the scientific activity of the Directorate General of Antiquities and Museums for more than half a century, it was able to introduce the world to the chapters of the ancient Syrian civilization and added to the history curricula in the world's universities and research centers ancient Syrian sciences, so it became These universities teach the flourishing prehistoric civilizations in Syria.

Thus, Syria became the focus of the attention of historians, archaeologists, and linguists, due to the data presented by the Syrian land that discredited many people's beliefs about the history of human civilizations in all historical eras known to mankind, because the Syrian land has embraced very important evidence for each era.

In 2012, Prof. Dr. Maamoun Abdulkarim was appointed as director-general until 26 Sep. 2017.

== Organization ==
The Directorate-General is split into several different direct directorates including:

- Directorate of Museum Affairs: Responsible for the management and development of all Syrian museums, in addition to supervising any foreign exhibition of Syrian artefacts.
- Directorate of Excavations and Archaeological Studies: Responsible for the managing, organizing and supervising excavation works inside Syria and cataloging any findings.
- Al-Bassel Center for Archaeological Research and Training: Responsible for the over-all process of research and training, in terms of publications and special-purpose courses.
- Directorate of Planning and Statistics
- Directorate of Historic Buildings
- Directorate of World Heritage Sites
- Directorate of Information Communication & Technology: Responsible for providing the proper tools, infrastructure, and training to develop, manage, and publish databases of museum objects, historical sites and monuments, and spatial information to help decision-makers.

As of 2011, its library contains some 14,000 volumes.

== World Heritage list sites in Syria ==
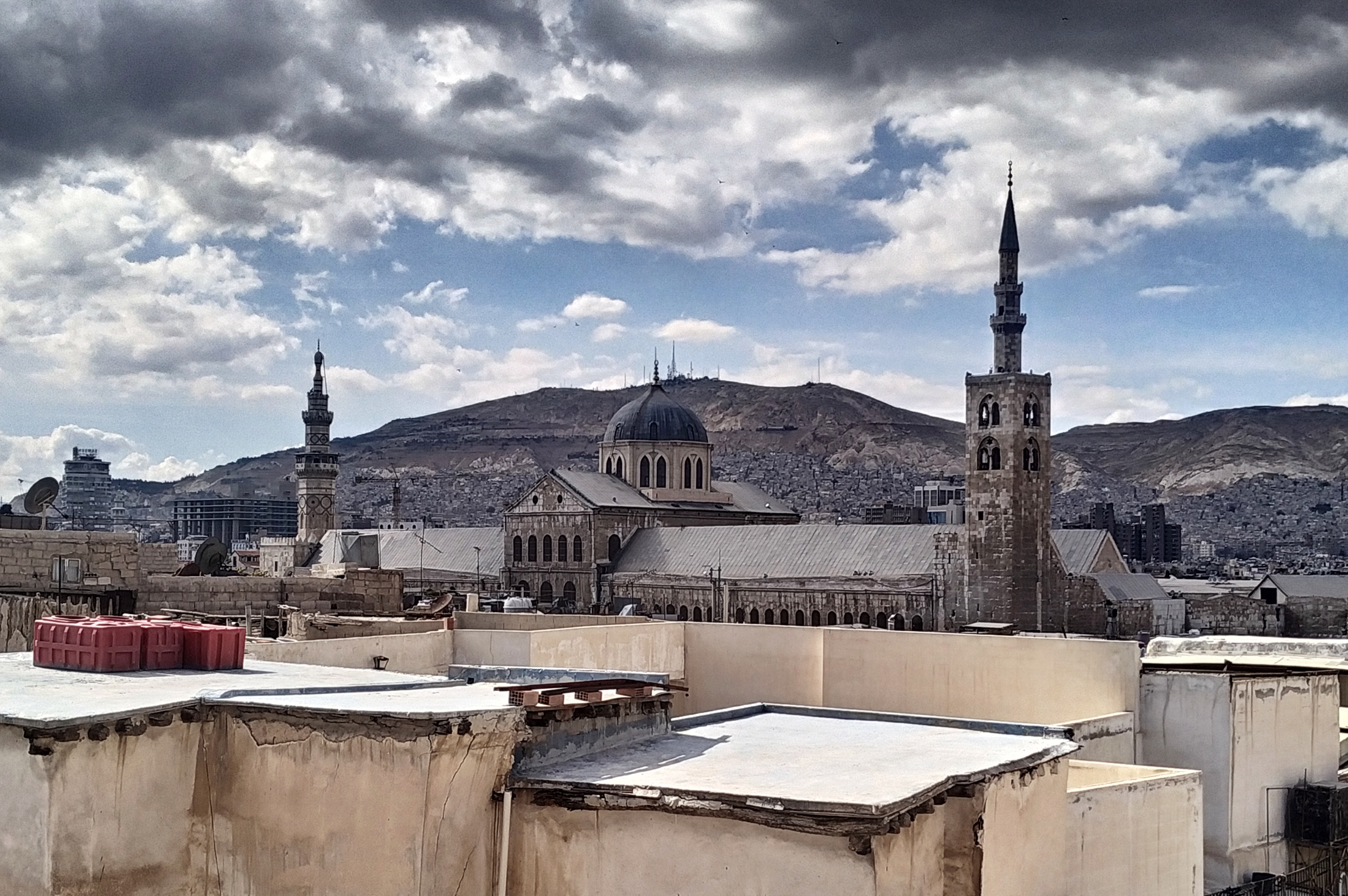
1. Old Damascus
  Ancient City of Damascus
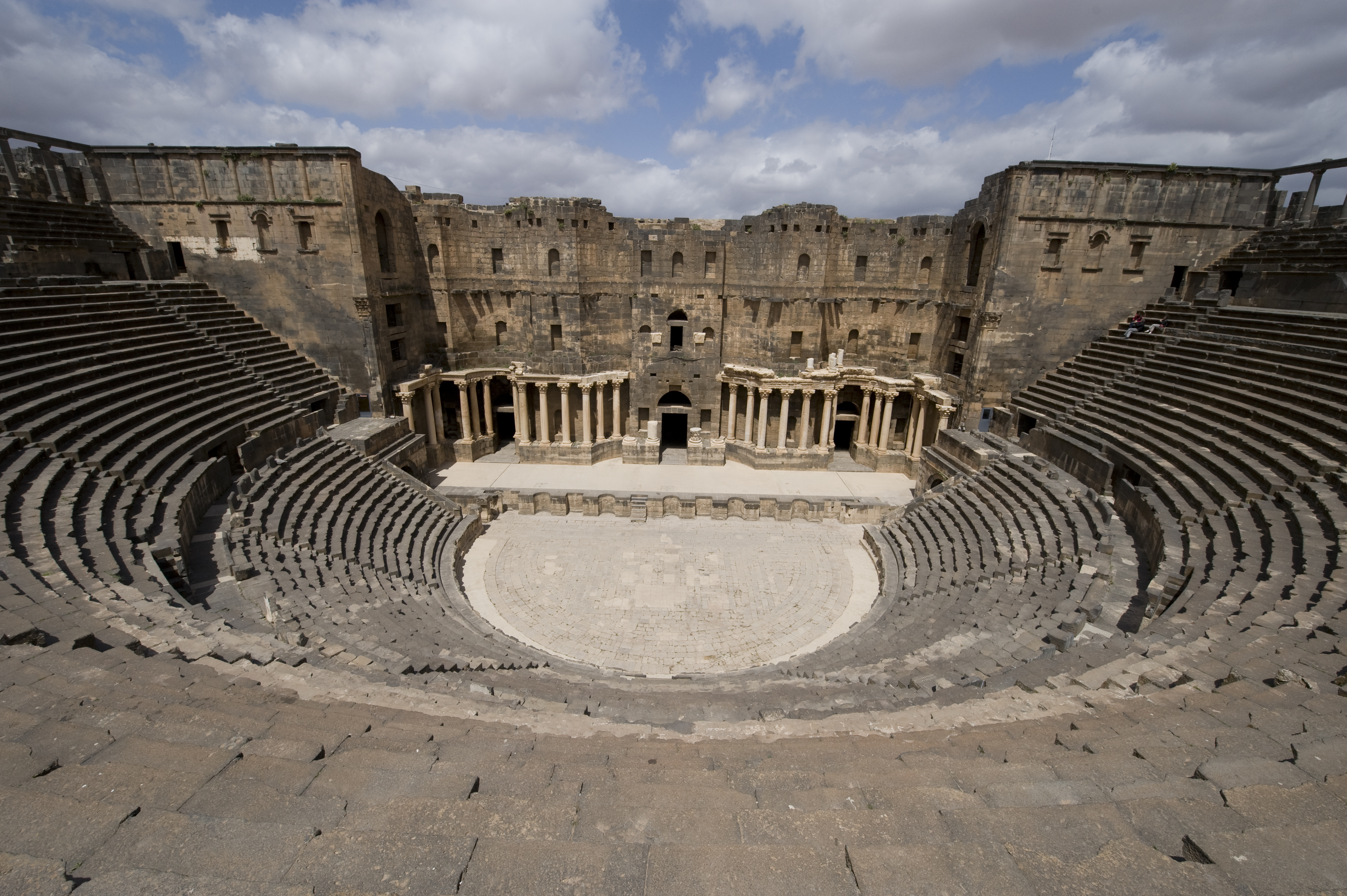
2. Bosra Roman Theater
  Ancient City of Bosra
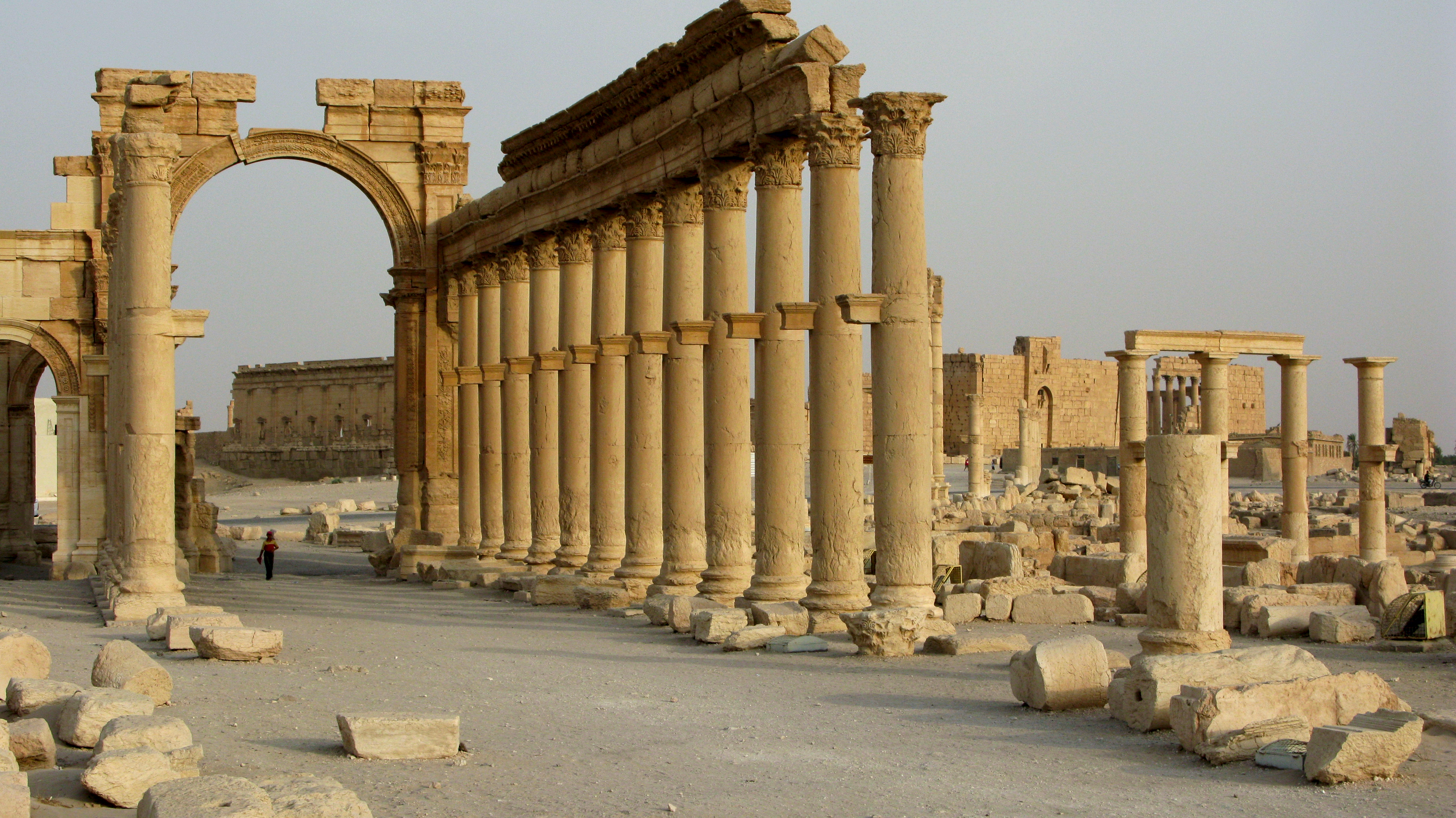
3. Palmyra, Monumental Arch and Columns
  Site of Palmyra
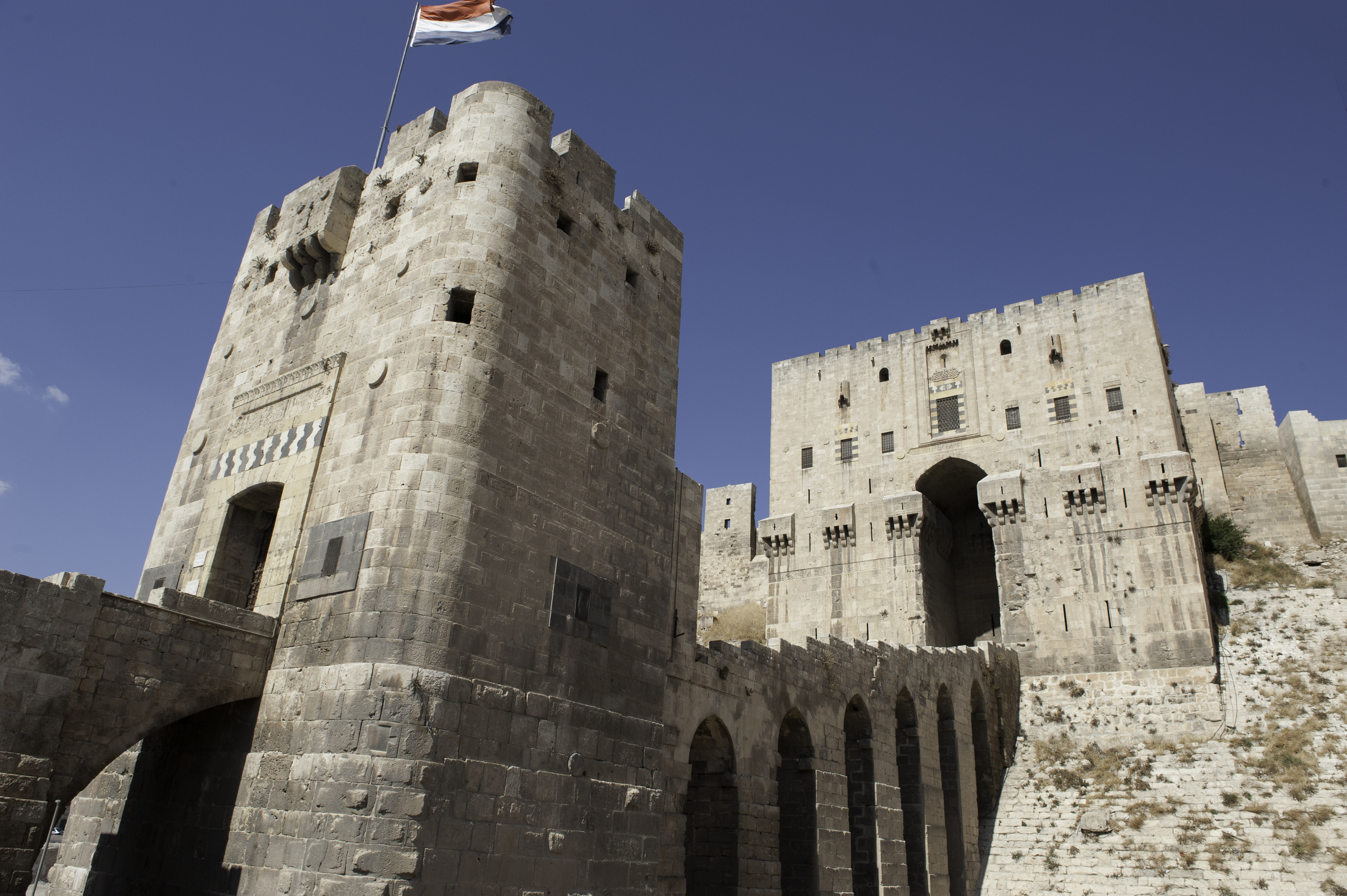
4. Aleppo Citadel Entrance
  Ancient City of Aleppo
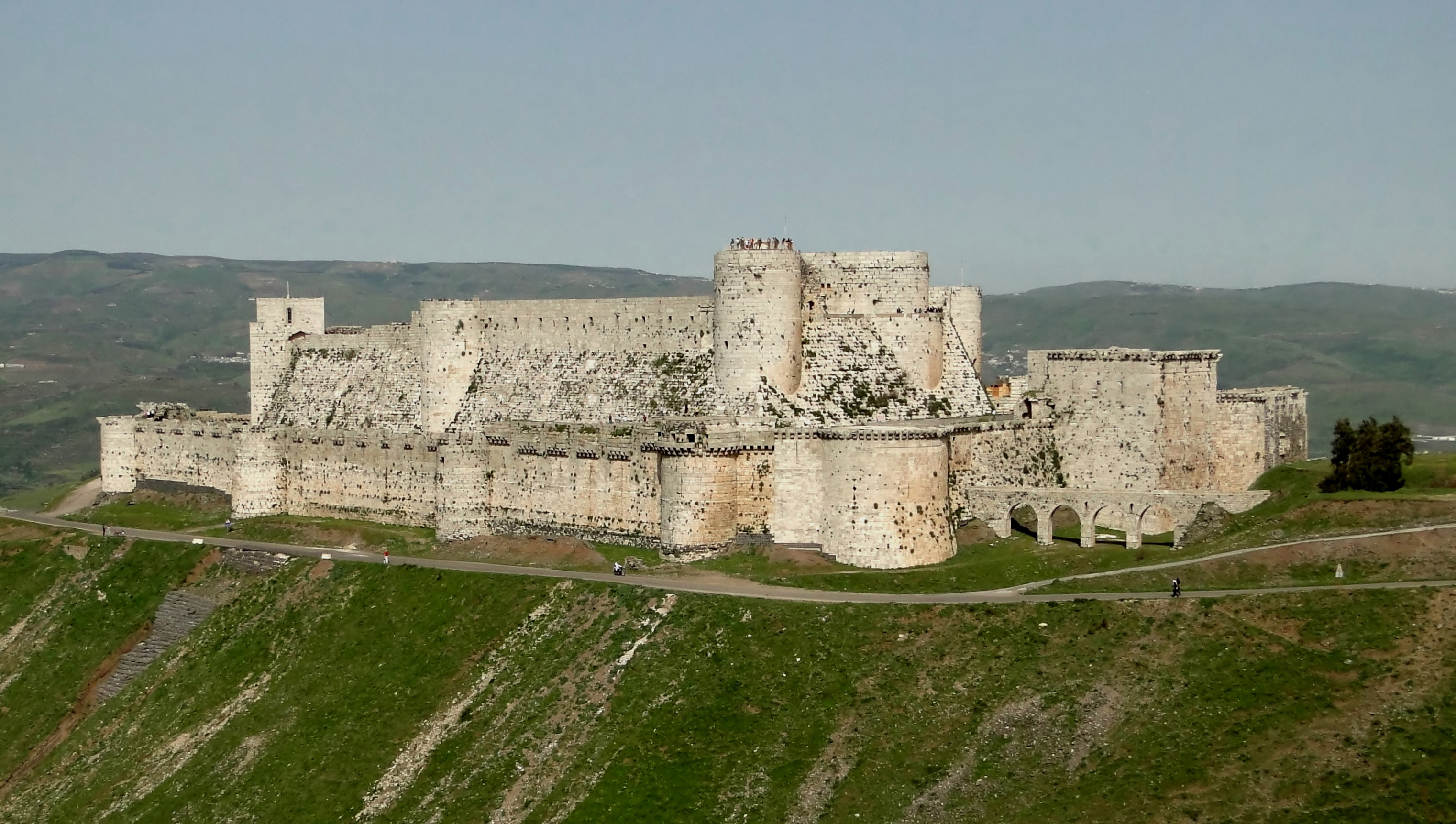
5. Crac des Chevaliers
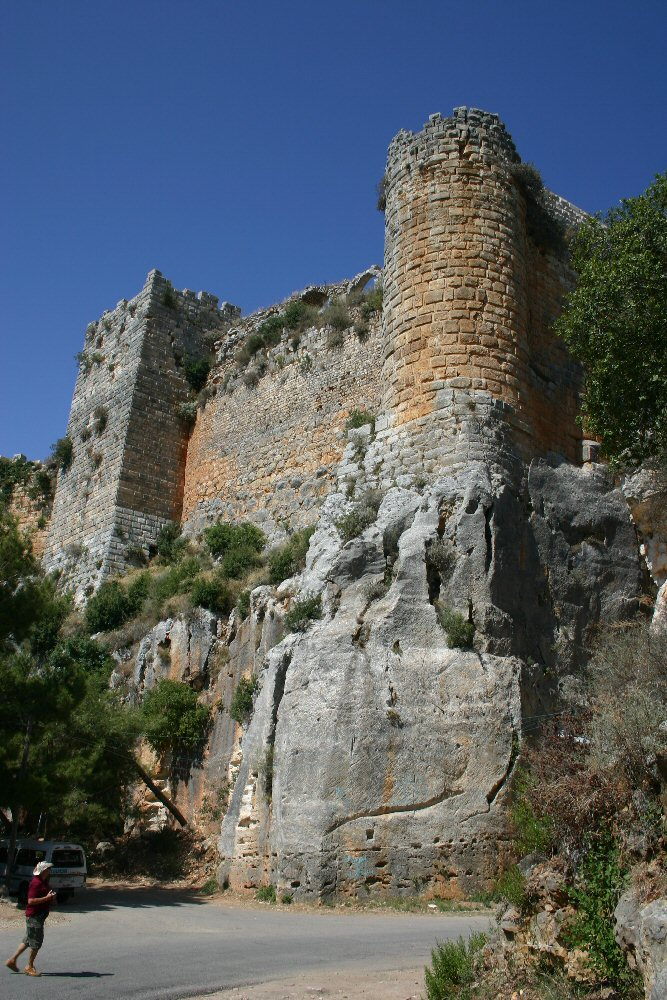
  Qa'alat Salah al-Din
  Crac des Chevaliers and Qal’at Salah El-Din
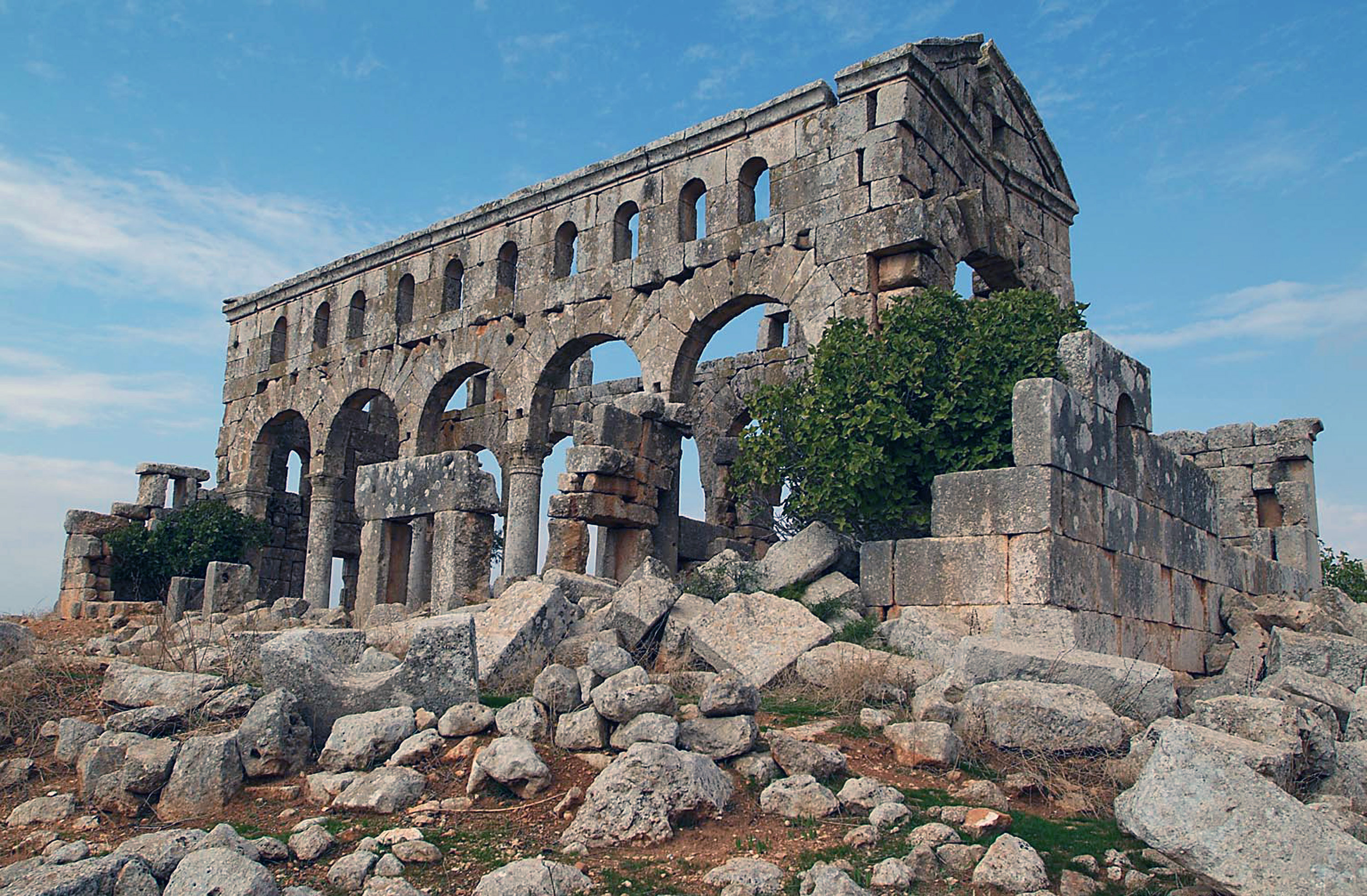
6. Kharab Shams Basilica, Dead Cities
  Ancient Villages of Northern Syria

== Publications ==
The Directorate General publishes since 1966 Les Annales Archéologiques Arabes Syriennes (AAAS), it succeeded Les Annales Archéologiques de Syrie which began publication in 1951 and continued its volume numbering.

== See also ==
- Directorate General of Antiquities – the comparable government department in Lebanon
