= Archaeology of Lebanon =

Archaeology in Lebanon

Archaeology of Lebanon includes thousands of years of history ranging from Lower Palaeolithic, Phoenician, Roman, Arab, Ottoman, and Crusades periods.

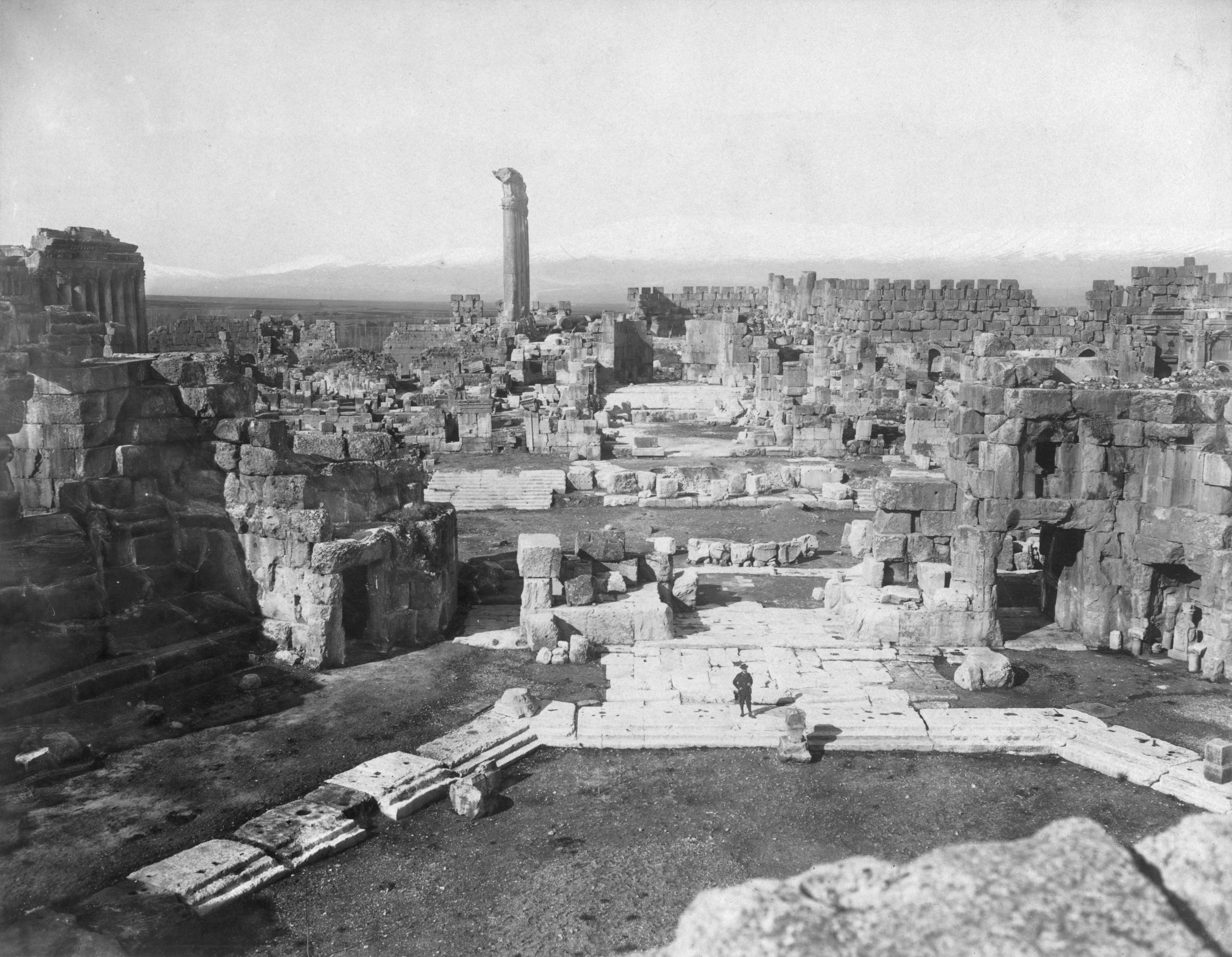
Overview of Baalbek in the late 19th century

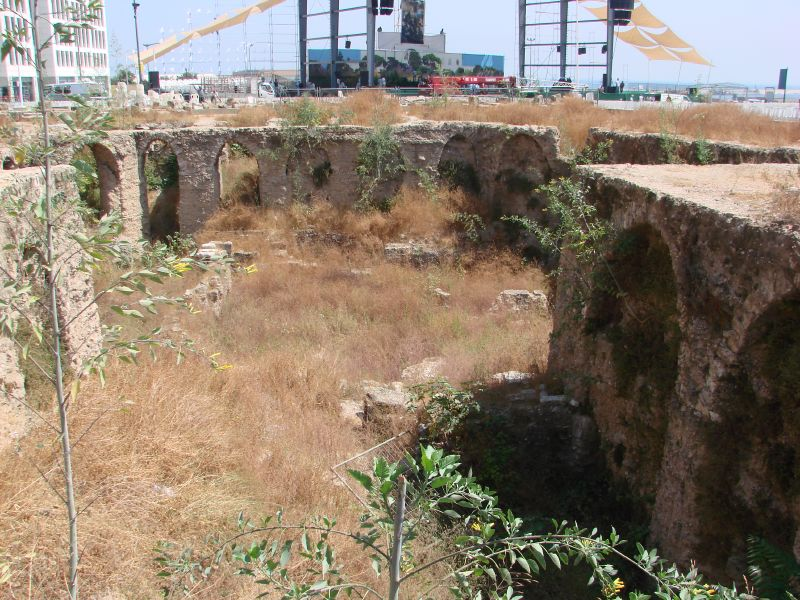
Archaeological site in Beirut

Greek inscription on one of the tombs found in the Roman-Byzantine necropolis, Tyre

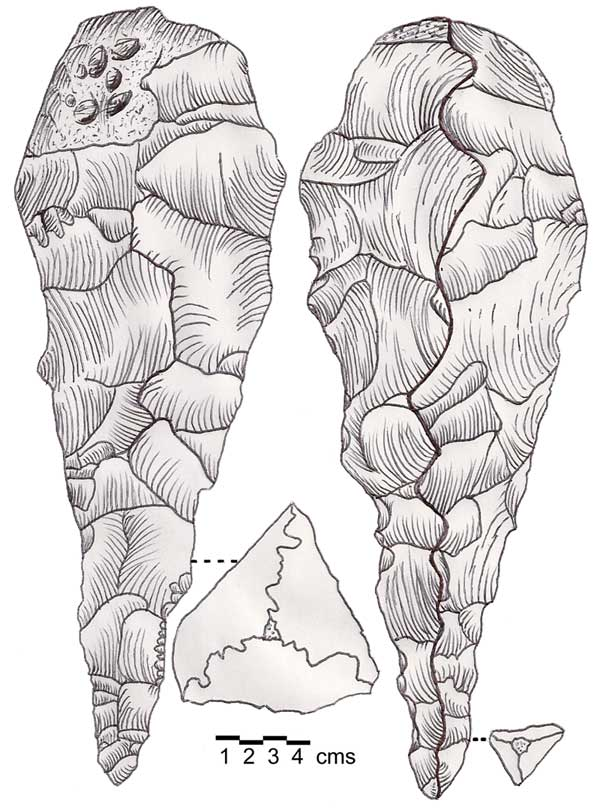
Trihedral Neolithic axe or pick from Joub Jannine II, Lebanon. Cream flint patinated to brown. In the collection of the Museum of Lebanese Prehistory at the Saint Joseph University, Beirut, Lebanon.

== Notable findings and sites ==
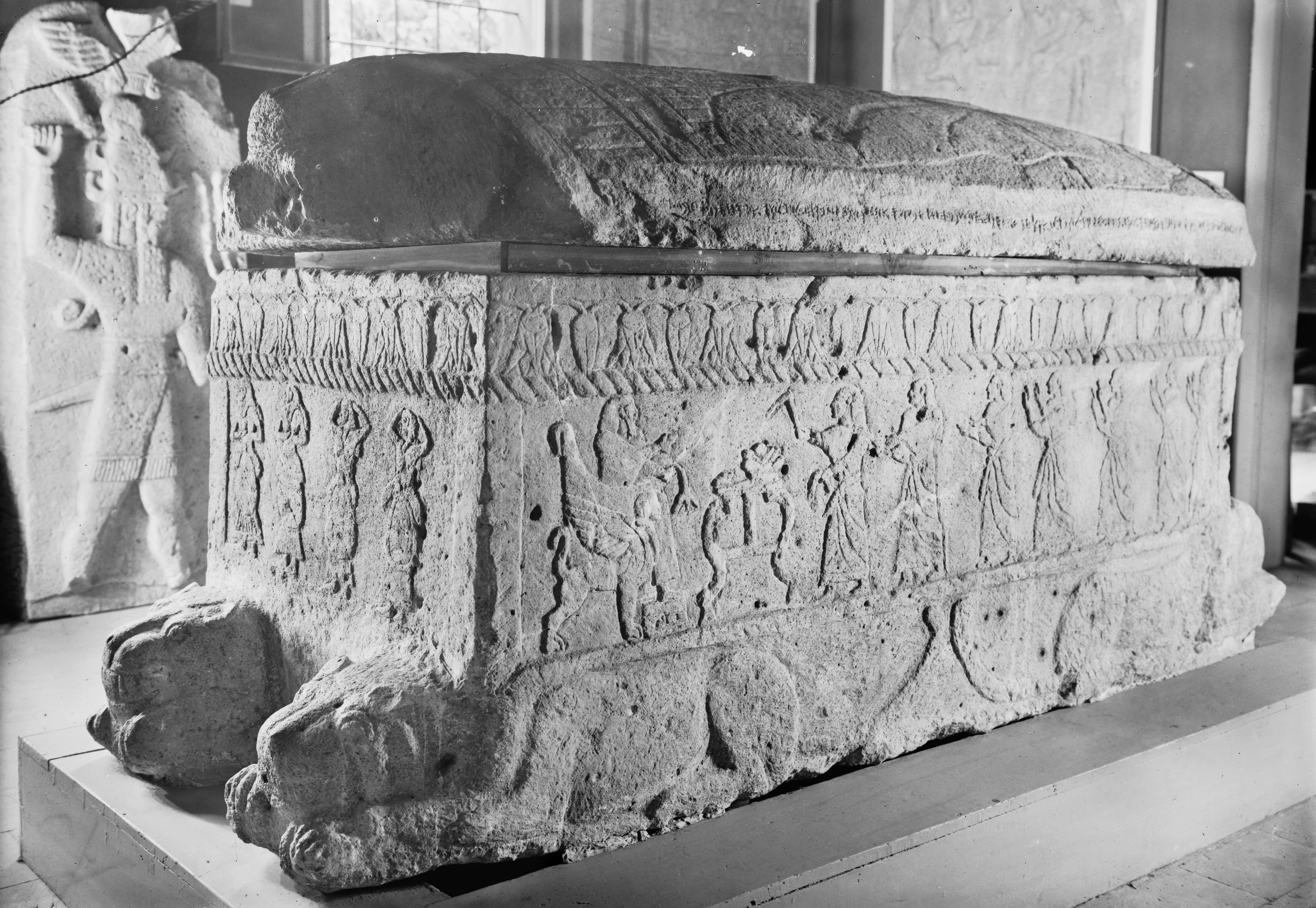
Sarcophagus of Ahiram in the National Museum of Beirut

Lebanon features several important Paleolithic sites associated with Neanderthals. These include Adloun, Chekka Jdidé, El-Masloukh, Ksar Akil, Nahr Ibrahim and Naame. Byblos is a well-known archaeological site, a Phoenician seaport, where the tomb of Ahiram and the other Byblian royal inscriptions were found. An ancient Phoenician inscription on the tomb dates to between the 13th and 10th centuries BCE. Byblos, as well as archaeological sites in Baalbek, Tyre, Sidon, and Tripoli, contain artifacts indicating the presence of libraries dating back to the period of Classical antiquity.

== Industry names ==
Lower Paleolithic industries of Lebanon have shown similarities to Chelleo-Acheulean, Acheulean, Tayacian (the Tabunian of Francis Clark Howell), Tayacio-Levalloisian and Early Levalloisian with some caution suggested to be observed with the use of some early Levalloisian and Acheulean labels that may be confused with the Heavy Neolithic of the Qaraoun culture. Middle Paleolithic industries suggested include Amudian (Pre-Aurignacian), early Yabrudian, (Acheulio-Yabrudian), Yabrudian, Micro-Levalloisian or Micro-Mousterian, Levalloisian, Mousterian and Levalloiso-Mousterian. Radio-carbon dating exists for Ksar Akil and Ras El Kelb. Various other industries have been judged to be typologically similar to these along with one described by Henri Fleisch in 1962 particular to "mountain sites" for which the Mayroubian culture has been defined after its type site, Mayrouba.

R. Neuville and Dorothy Garrod divided the Upper Paleolithic of Lebanon into six stages based on stratified sites in the surrounding area. Stage one has Emirian and transitional varieties, stage two was possibly evidenced at Ksar Akil. Stages three and four have been termed Lower and Upper Antelian after the Antelias Cave. Stage five is Atlitian, possibly developed from stage four. Stage six is identified as Kebaran, of which there are many varieties of assemblage based on locality.

Several early Neolithic (similar to Neolithic Ancien of Byblos or Amuq A) sites were found by Diana Kirkbride in the Beqaa Valley in 1964 and mentioned by James Mellaart in 1965. The Neolithic of Lebanon was divided up into three stages by Maurice Dunand based on the stratified levels of Byblos. The first two stages, "Néolithique Ancien" and "Néolithique Moyen", were characterized by an economy based on a mixture of hunting and farming whereas "Néolithique Récent" displayed a shift to agriculture evidenced by fewer arrowheads and more grinding tools and sickle blades.

Various other Neolithic industries have been found in Lebanon such as Trihedral Neolithic and Shepherd Neolithic. Henri Fleisch discovered and termed the Shepherd Neolithic flint industry from the Bekaa Valley in Lebanon and suggested that it could have been used by the earliest nomadic shepherds. He dated this industry to the Epipaleolithic or Pre-Pottery Neolithic as it is evidently not Paleolithic, Mesolithic or even Pottery Neolithic.

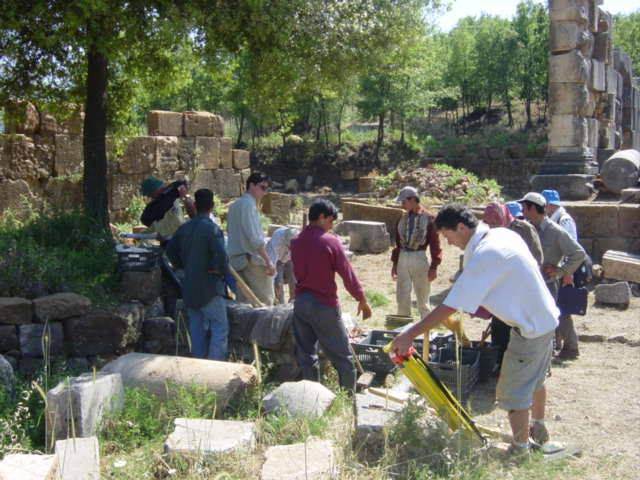
Archeological mission in the Temple of Yanouh in 2002

One particularly vigorous culture identified at over forty sites by Jesuit archaeologists in Lebanon is called the Qaraoun culture. This culture existed at the dawn of agriculture without pottery and produced Heavy Neolithic flint tools such as axes and picks to work with lumber, such as the Cedars of Lebanon. Their type site is Qaraoun II, located close to the El Wauroun Dam, Mount Hermon and Aaiha.

The Chalcolithic was divided into two periods by Jacques Cauvin based on stratified levels at Byblos; "Énéolithique Ancien" and "Énéolithique Récent". The division is marked largely by differences in pottery more than flints with a few notable exceptions such as fan-scrapers. There are a large number of tells in the Beqaa Valley and Akkar Plain which have Early Bronze Age or earlier deposits including one under the Grand Court in front of the Temple of Jupiter in Baalbek.

== Surveys and dating of prehistoric sites ==
Descriptions of some of the tells in the Beqaa Valley were published by A. Jirku in 1933, L. Burkhalter in 1948 and A. Kuschke in 1954, along with a map of the Beqaa Valley by Bernard Geze in 1956 that marked 50 tells. Another major survey of Lebanese tells was carried out between 1965 and 1966 with 88 tells recorded along with numerous surface sites by Lorraine Copeland and Peter Wescombe. Materials collected were presented for comment and identification to a 'panel of experts' that included Diana Kirkbride, Jacques Cauvin, Henri de Contenson, Maurice Dunand, Francis Hours, Henri Fleisch, Robert John Braidwood, Ralph Solecki, W.J. van Liere, G.L. Harding, H. Balfet, Olga Tufnell, Brian Gregor and Ziyad Beydoun.

== Temples of Lebanon ==
Lebanon contains a diverse range of ruins and remains of Ancient Greek and Roman temples. The premier attraction being the complex at Baalbek, including the enormous temple of Jupiter and outstandingly well preserved temple of Bacchus. It is thought that local villages attempted to create similar temples to a diverse range of Gods, leaving ancient shrines and vestiges to be found all around the country-side. This has led to the country itself being described an "open-air museum". George F. Taylor divided the temples of Lebanon into three groups, one group referred to the Temples of the Lebanese coastal plain to Mount Lebanon, another group as Temples of the Beqaa Valley and another area with a particularly heavy concentration was defined as the Temples of Mount Hermon.

== Damage to archaeological sites ==
During the 2006 Lebanon war, a number of archaeological sites, including World Heritage Sites, were damaged as a result of Israeli aerial bombardments in Lebanon. A survey of the damage to sites in Lebanon was launched by UNESCO after the international archaeological community, including the director of the British Museum, Neil MacGregor, urged an investigation into the effects of bombing on "one of the planet's most heritage-rich countries." UNESCO's team of experts found that the most serious damage resulting from the conflict was at the World Heritage Site of Byblos, where an oil spill resulting from the targeting of fuel tanks at the Jiyeh power plant had stained the stones at the base of the port's two Medieval towers, among other archaeological remains on the seashore. Mounir Bouchenaki, Director-General of the International Centre for the Study of the Preservation and Restoration of Cultural Property (ICCROM) estimated that it would take twenty-five people eight to ten weeks to manually hand-clean the affected areas, placing the cost of the operation at some 100,000 USD.

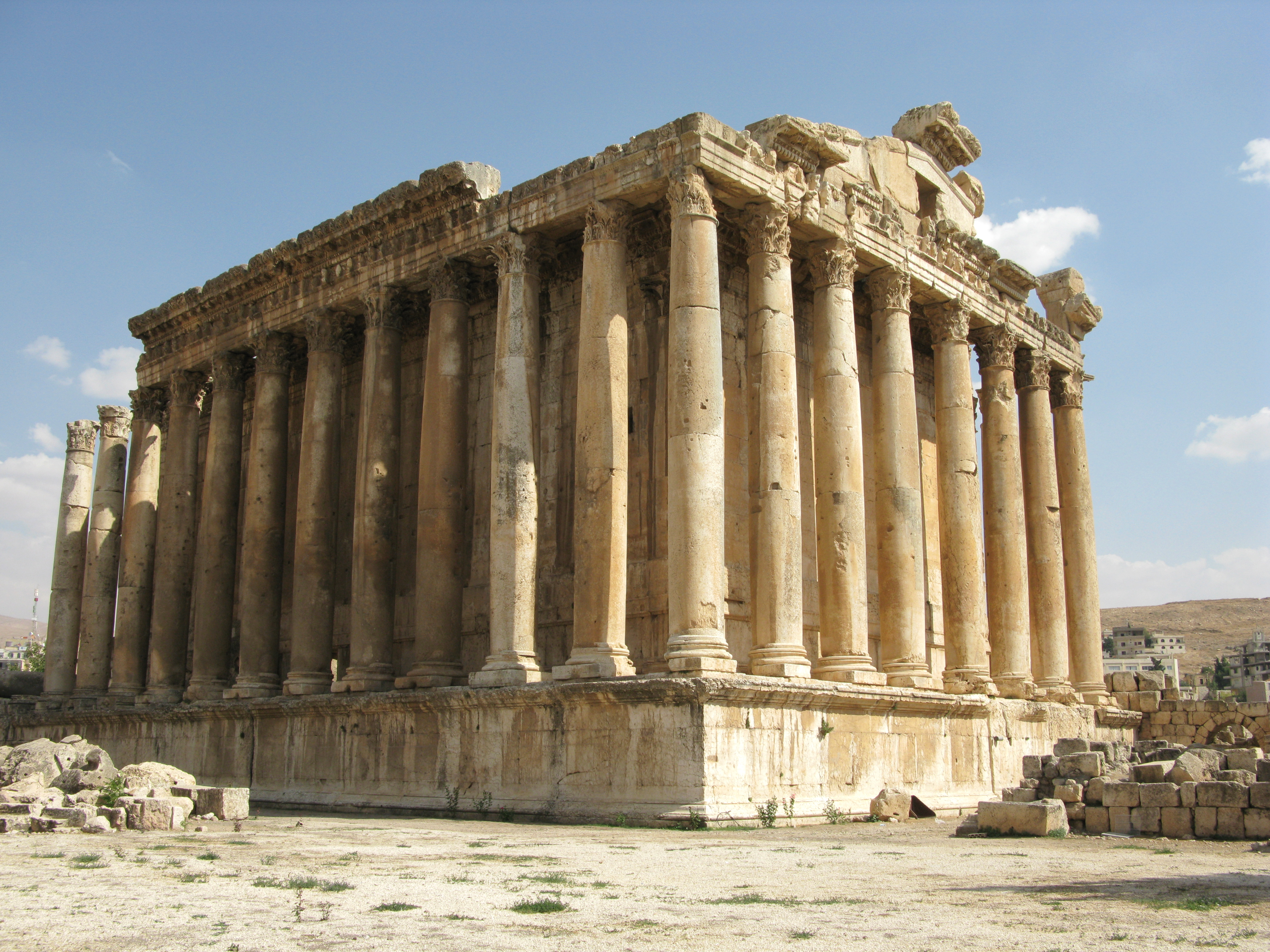
Temple of Bacchus

The mission also found that the main features of the World Heritage Site of Tyre, such as the Ancient Roman hippodrome and triumphal arch had escaped damage, but that frescoes in a Roman tomb at the site had come loose, likely because of vibrations caused by bombs. It was also reported that the World Heritage Site of Baalbek was not damaged by bombs, with the exception of the fall of one block of stone and the widening of fissures on the lintels in the temples of Jupiter and Bacchus, likely due to vibrations from nearby bombings. Also damaged by bombs, as noted by the mission, were the souk and some old houses in the Old City of Baalbek that were not part of the property inscribed on the World Heritage List.

At a press conference revealing the results of the survey, Françoise Rivière, UNESCO's Assistant Director-General for Culture, reported on UNESCO's efforts during and after the fighting to draw the attention of both parties to their obligations to spare cultural heritage, as protected by the Hague Convention for the Protection of Cultural Property in the Event of Armed Conflict, to which both Lebanon and Israel are States Parties.

The recent increase in pace of urbanization in Lebanon has raised notable issues in the news regarding the Beirut Hippodrome and a suggested Phoenician port of Beirut. Non-governmental organizations such as the Association for the Protection of Lebanese Heritage have organized public demonstrations and co-operate with cultural activist groups such as Save Beirut Heritage to increase awareness of heritage conservation in the country.

As well as emphasizing the value of collaboration and a multidisciplinary approach for cultural heritage conservation, we should place a high priority on the return of illegally trafficked Lebanese artifacts.

== See also ==
- Levantine archaeology
- Museum of Lebanese Prehistory
- Archaeological Museum of the American University of Beirut
- National Museum of Beirut
- List of tells in lebanon
- Culture of Lebanon
- BAAL Journal
