= Phoenician port of Beirut =

- Location within Lebanon
- 33.898859°N 35.497396°E
- Type: Harbour
- Periods: Iron Age III, Persian, Ottoman
- Cultures: Phoenician
- Location: Between Rue Allenby & Rue Foch, Beirut, Lebanon

Site notes
- Excavation dates: 2000, 2011-2012
- Archaeologists: Josette Elayi, Hussein Sayegh, Assaad Seif, Hisham Sayegh, Nick Marriner, Ralph Pederson, Hanz Curver.
- Public access: no

The Phoenician port of Beirut, also known as the Phoenician Harbour of Beirut and archaeological site BEY039, is located between Rue Allenby and Rue Foch in Beirut, Lebanon. Studies have shown that the Bronze Age waterfront lay around 300 metres (330 yd) behind the modern port due to coastal regularisation and siltation. It was excavated and reported on by Josette Elayi and Hala Sayegh in 2000 and determined to date to the Iron Age III and Persian periods. Two nineteenth-century Ottoman docks were also unearthed during construction, just to the north of this area at archaeological sites BEY018 and BEY019.

Excavations at BEY039 covered 3,000 square metres (0.30 ha) and comprised the western bank of a north-to-south-facing harbor about 300 metres (980 ft) from the sea. It was made up of Ramleh sandstone blocks measuring about 60 centimetres (24 in) by 30 centimetres (12 in), fixed with a grey mortar. This overlaid a layer of larger blocks measuring about 100 centimetres (39 in) by 60 centimetres (24 in) that were fixed without mortar. This type of construction was similar to that used during Phoenician period D. Although this harbor has now been reliably identified, the existence of other ports or areas used for harboring boats in the nearby coves at different times has not been ruled out.

== Controversy over site BEY194 ==
Another alleged port, suggested to consist of two ancient dry docks and the foundations of a massive ancient temple was located at Plot 1398 in Mina al-Hosn, Beirut in Lebanon. The alleged port, classified as archaeological site BEY194 was demolished by urbanization at 6:00 a.m. on 27 June 2012.

The alleged port was discovered during construction on the site in 2011 and investigated by a team of Lebanese archaeologists from the Directorate General of Antiquities under Hisham Sayegh, a B.A. graduate and pottery specialist from the Lebanese University. The site was said to include two canals or watercourses that comprised the supposed dry docks along with two large sandstones, considered to be part of the enormous foundations of an ancient temple. The surrounding area, called Mina al-Hosn is translated as "port of the fort" in Arabic. Precise dating of the structures was never obtained however there were a few finds of pottery at the site that were dated to the fifth century BCE.

Controversy arose in June 2012, when authorization was given by Lebanese Minister of Culture, Gaby Layoun for a private company called Venus Towers Real Estate Development Company to destroy the ruins for the $500 million construction project of three skyscrapers and a garden at Mina al-Hosn, behind Hotel Monroe in downtown Beirut. Letters from Francesco Bandarin, assistant director-general for culture at UNESCO and director of the World Heritage Centre, and the International Council on Monuments and Sites (ICOMOS) dated March and May 2012 respectively, both expressed concern and offered to provide expertise and opinions on the site, both offers appearing to have been turned down by the Minister. The alleged port was classified as "cultural heritage" by the previous minister Salim Wardeh and his scientific committee including Laure Salloum, Anis Chaya, Nadine Panayot and Assaad Seif based on Sayegh's report. Various other experts and archaeologists expressed views suggesting the importance of the find, including Jean Yves Empereur (director of research at CNRS and director of the Alexandria Studies Centre), David Blackman (researcher at the University of Oxford), Marguerite Yon (research director emeritus at the University of Lyon and former director of the French Archaeological Mission of Salamis, Kaliopi Baika, Kition and Ras Shamra-Ugarit), Ana-Maria Busila (PhD University of Iasi, Romania) and Jean-Christophe Sourisseau (responsible for the excavation of Kition in Cyprus). The claim that the site was a port was disputed by a new scientific committee of archaeologists appointed by Layoun including Hassan Salame Sarkis, Albert Naccache and Samir Chami based on reports of Hanz Curver (who initially supported Sageyh's findings, then reversed his opinion) and Ralph Pedersen a research associate of the institute of Nautical Archaeology and now teaching at Marburg in Germany. Pederson's report was commissioned by the construction company and dismissed Sayegh's claims that the trenches could have been used as a port or dry dock on several criteria. Questions were raised regarding the size and elevation of the trenches, their suitability for military ships, similarity to other Phoenician docks in the area and distance from the sea. Dry dock trenches of the period also usually had holes cut into their side to fit wooden supports for the ships and these were absent from the plot at Minet el-Hosn. Suggestions were raised about them being slipways for a quarry, however their exact purpose has no apparent consensus. The problem over the distance from the sea could not be accounted for due to sea level fluctuations in the Phoenician period, however no firm date was given to the construction of the bedrock cut trenches.

Hisham Sayegh's contract with the Ministry was not renewed and on 27 June he claimed to have resigned in a letter that accused Venus Towers of attempted bribery to falsify scientific information. "I refused with previous culture ministers bribes that have been generously offered by the Venus company, the owner of the land so that we would agree to falsify scientific truth and divert the origin and significance of this discovery at the heart of the capital Beirut". Former Minister Wardeh was quoted as saying "No sane person would imagine that it is possible to give an order over a telephone to a company to demolish the site, and that the company would be ready with bulldozers to carry out the destruction without waiting for the decree to be published in the official Gazette."

Based on the information of Sayegh, in a letter dated April 2011, Assaad Seif, coordinator of archaeological research and excavations in Lebanon at the Directorate General of Antiquities endorsed the discovery and called for the protection of the area, suggesting provision of fair compensation to the construction firm. He called it a significant find for the study of the Phoenician era in Beirut, particularly before 100 BCE, saying "“We need to preserve this site and its surrounding block, which would require the construction firm to carry out the appropriate modifications to its project.” Seif now agrees with the evaluation report from the international committee and expert report that BEY194 was not used as a port and that the data from Sayegh was not at all reliable and had many inconsistencies in the stratigraphy and the dating.

Other Lebanese civil societies and organizations have raised criticism and controversy over the issue. Pascale Ingea, president of the Association for the Protection of the Lebanese Heritage has been spearheading the efforts to stop the demolition, stating "There is nothing left. We are appalled by those who burn tires. But the real vandals are wearing ties. If we had known earlier, we could have stopped this massacre". Another lead activist, Giorgio Tarraf, spokesman for Save Beirut Heritage expressed his horror at the speed and extent of the demolition, interviewed by Al Akhbar (Lebanon), he said "They (government) were talking about some sort of mitigation approach where they move the stones and preserve them in a way that would be leave room for development. Not even that happened – today nothing is going to remain." After actions from these Lebanese NGOs and activists such as Raja Noujem, a decision from Judge Nadim Zouein temporarily halted construction activities. Zouein refused to extend the ban past Monday 9 July, saying that it was better to address the Shura council for such decisions. It also came to light on 9 July that Venus Towers, the construction firm, did not have the appropriate license to dig up the site due to an administrative mistake. The firm was fined 500,000 Lebanese pounds and its managing director Mohammed Kassem admitted the expiry of their license along with confirming his opinion that there was no evidence of the presence of ship building or a port on his land.

The construction firm Venus has currently blocked access for people to access and photograph or video the site, however activists and protestors have climbed trees to throw paper boats, inscribed with the slogan "Hands off our Phoenician Port" over the walls.

The destruction of archaeological site BEY194 took place two days prior to the publication of Minister Layoun's decision in the official Gazette, leading to claims that he acted in violation of Lebanese law and setting a concerning precedent for similar actions in future. The ministry maintains that the declassification of the site was done through the legal adopted procedures by the governmental institutions.

The report by Pederson concluded that the trenches were 3.9 metres (13 ft) and 4.2 metres (14 ft) wide which is only big enough for small, single banked, Aphracts of around 18 meters in length, that they were not parallel, at different elevations and not part of a military complex. Most importantly, the bottoms of the trenches were not a smooth slope that is required for hauling ships up and down- there were short inclines of about 8 to 9 meters long, steps, level areas, and even a part that exhibited a slight reverse pitch. Whilst authoritatively dismissing the site at BEY194 as a Phoenician port, it offers no suggestion on what the trenches could have been used for and at what date, reserving speculation on their function as "intriguing" and one that perhaps now will forever remain a mystery.
