= Jesuit Garden =

Jesuit(s) Garden(s) may refer to:

- Jesuit Garden (Beirut), park
- Xiyang Lou, historical park in Beijing, also known as Jesuit Garden
- Ivan Franko Park in Lviv, Ukraine, formerly known as "Jesuit Gardens"
- Jesuit Garden, part of public park in the Český Krumlov Castle
