= Traveller's Rest Pit =

Geological site in Cambridge, England

Coordinates: 52.218°N 0.09°E

- Site of Special Scientific Interest
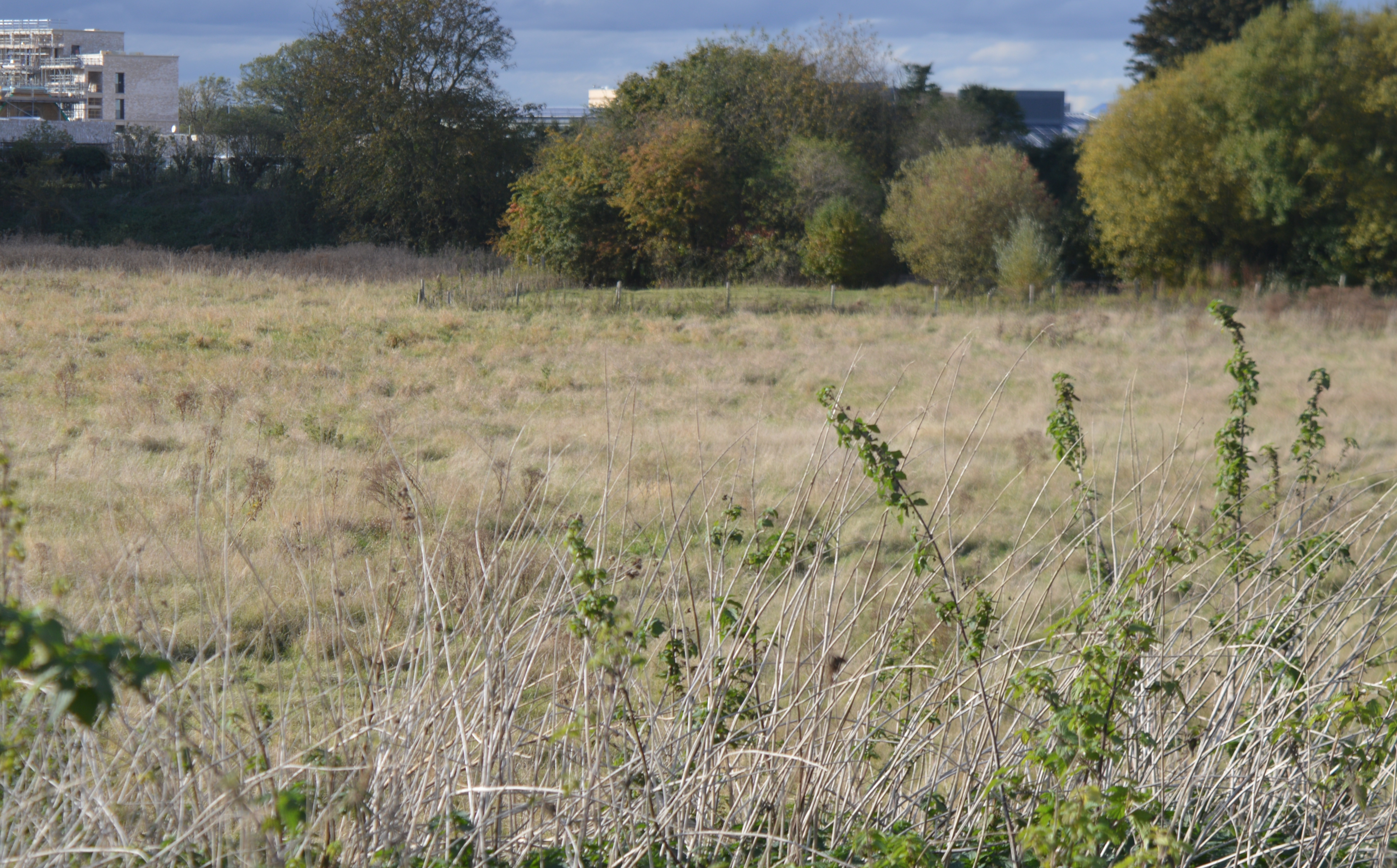
- Location of Traveller's Rest Pit.
- Area of search: Cambridgeshire
- Grid reference: TL 429 598
- Interest: Geological
- Area: 2.2 hectares
- Notification date: 1983
- Location map: Magic Map

Traveller's Rest Pit is a 2.2-hectare (5.4-acre) geological Site of Special Scientific Interest on the western outskirts of Cambridge. It is a Geological Conservation Review site.

This is described by Natural England as an important site dating to the Anglian ice age around 450,000 years ago. Ice wedges indicate a long period of permafrost. Non-marine molluscs and occasional large vertebrates indicate an open landscape. The site also has the most extensive collection of stone tools in Cambridgeshire. These are thought to date to the Cromerian Stage, which preceded the Anglian, and are of Chellean, Acheulian, Early Levalloisian and Clactonian types.

The site has been filled in. Part of the site lies under the playing fields at Eddington, the remainder is private land with no public access.
