= Jesuit Garden (Beirut) =

Public park in Beirut, Lebanon

Coordinates: 33.893422°N 35.525835°E

The Jesuit Garden, also known as Geitawi Garden and sometimes also as Jesuits' Garden, is a public park in the Remeil District of Beirut, Lebanon. It is located in the Moscow Street, covering around 44,000 square meters. it is one of the best and most popular gardens in Beirut.

The garden was given to the city in the 1960s by the Society of Jesus. The Jesuits opened schools in the area around an ancient Byzantine church in the 1600s. The garden houses the remains of an ancient temple and includes features such as Roman columns and mosaics. It also is the home to a small public library with 7,500 books donated by the Jesuits, which sits amongst one-hundred-year-old pine trees. Its proximity to the Greek Orthodox hospital and Getaoui hospital make it a popular destination for people visiting relatives and friends at the hospitals.

In 2013, the garden was selected for demolition by the Beirut Municipality in order to create a new underground car park as part of a motorway extension project. The parking lot project has caused uproar amongst local residents and heritage activists who staged a protest on Saturday 15 June 2013. Over three hundred people attended to voice their anger at the Municipality planners and the Ministry of Culture. Various different groups and non-governmental organisations attended and voiced concern, including Green Line, Biladi, Save Beirut Heritage and the Association for the Protection of Lebanese Heritage. Guided tours were given of the ruins and it was explained how the planned construction work would irreparably damage the trees, Byzantine church and one of the few green spaces left in Beirut.
