= ASSABIL Association =

Assabil Association is a non-governmental association founded in Lebanon in 1997 to establish and promote public libraries in the country in order to support democracy. The association has set up four objectives:

1. Establishing, promoting, and supporting a network of public libraries throughout Lebanon.
2. Sponsoring cultural and social activities that encourage people to come to the library.
3. Establishing a training program for librarians and others who work in libraries.
4. Encouraging the production of books and educational materials in Arabic – especially for children.

With three municipal public libraries and one original bus-library concept, Assabil Libraries continue to try to achieve their purpose of creating and providing public libraries for cultural exchange and access to information and books. It supports a network of 30 public libraries in rural areas of Lebanon and is one of the projects funded by AFAC.

== Libraries ==
In Beirut, Assabil Libraries created three public spaces suitable for adults and children, in Bachoura, Geitawi and Monnot.

=== Bachoura ===
This public library in Bachoura is a municipal public library in the capital, Beirut. The library has books and games in Arabic, French, English, Armenian, German, Tamil, and Ethiopian.

=== Geitawi ===
Geitawi public library opened its doors in 2004 inside the Jesuit public garden. The library has books and games in Arabic, French, English, Armenian, and Spanish.

=== Monnot ===
This municipal library is in the Achrafieh Monnot area. A selection of books, newspapers, magazines, and games is available for all ages in Arabic, French, and English.

=== Kotobus ===
Assabil and UNICEF joined forces to bring this idea to life and allow a simple bus to tour the country and introduce children to books, under the basic right of education in the declaration of human rights.

== Resources and Training Centers ==
The Resource and Training Center is a resource for librarians, teachers, writers, illustrators, publishers, animators and other practitioners who work to promote reading, books and children’s literature.

== See also ==
- List of libraries in Lebanon
