= Ministry of Culture (Lebanon) =

Government ministry of Lebanon

Coordinates: 33°53′32″N 35°29′5″E

Lebanese Republic Ministry of Culture وزارة الثقافة
- Coat of arms of Lebanon

Agency overview
- Formed: 1993; 33 years ago
- Jurisdiction: Government of Lebanon
- Headquarters: Beirut
- Agency executive: Ghassan Salame, Minister of Culture
- Website: www.culture.gov.lb

The Ministry of Culture (Arabic: وزارة الثقافة) is a government ministry of Lebanon.

== History ==
The Ministry was formed in 1993, originally as part of the Ministry of Culture and Higher Education from which it became a separate entity in August 2000. In 2008, Law 35 was passed, which restructured the Ministry. Since then, its responsibilities include matters of heritage, antiquities, arts, literature, cultural industries and management of cultural and historical property.

== Structure ==
The Ministry is divided into three units, The Directorate General of Cultural Affairs, The Directorate General of Antiquities and The Joint Administrative Service. It also runs The Baakleen National Library, the General Authority for Museums and the National Higher Institute of Music. It is also attached to the National Committee for Education, Knowledge and Culture.

== List of Culture ministers ==
Minister	Term of office	
Michel Edde	1993	1996
Fawzi Hobeiche	1996	24 Dec 1998
Muhammad Baydoun (Note: Served simultaneously as Minister of Education.)	24 Dec 1998	23 Oct 2000
Ghassan Salamé	23 Oct 2000	17 Apr 2003
Ghazi Aridi	17 Apr 2003	07 Sep 2004
Naji Al-Boustani	07 Sep 2004	26 Oct 2004
Karam Karam	26 Oct 2004	19 Apr 2005
Assad Rizk	19 Apr 2005	19 Jul 2005
Tarek Mitri (Note: Served simultaneously as Acting Minister of Foreign Affairs.)	19 Jul 2005	21 Jul 2008
Tammam Salam	22 Jul 2008	10 Nov 2009
Salim Wardeh	10 Nov 2009	13 Jun 2011
Gaby Layyoun	13 Jun 2011	15 Feb 2014
Rony Araygi	15 Feb 2014	18 Dec 2016
Ghattas Khoury	18 Dec 2016	31 Jan 2019
Mohammad Daoud	31 Jan 2019	21 Jan 2020
Abbas Mortada (Note: Resigned 10 August 2020, but remained in office as caretaker minister.)	21 Jan 2020	10 Sep 2021
Mohammad Wissam El-Mortada (Note: Resigned 30 October 2022, but remained in office as caretaker minister.)	10 Sep 2021	08 Feb 2025
Ghassan Salame	08 Feb 2025	Incumbent

== See also ==
- Archaeology in Lebanon
- Beirut Heritage Trail
