= Mayroubian =

The Mayroubian (from the type site Mayrouba) is a culture of the Lebanese Stone Age. Archaeological sites of this culture occur in the earliest, cretaceous, sandstone layer at altitudes of over 1,000 metres (3,300 ft) in the districts of Meten, Chouf and Kesrouan.

The Mayroubian type of site was first detected by Henri Fleisch, who collected surface finds of flint tools and defined a typological variation particular to "mountain sites". Lorraine Copeland and Peter Wescombe preferred use of the term "Meyroubian" after one site was found that was not in the mountains. The term is used to describe around twenty five known surface sites with assemblages of around eighty percent Middle Paleolithic to twenty percent Upper Paleolithic in form. O. Prufer and E. Baldwin noted a resemblance to those in levels seven and nine of Yabrud Shelter I. Henri Fleisch suggested successive occupations from the Middle Paleolithic to the Upper Paleolithic at all sites apart from Jebel Mazloum, which was classed as a transitional Upper Paleolithic site. Francis Hours suggested it was a transitional industry between the Middle Paleolithic and Upper Paleolithic periods and was placed by Copeland and Wescombe in the final Mousterian.
