= Chelleo-Acheulean =

Palaeolithic stone tool industry

The Chelleo-Acheulean is a Palaeolithic stone tool industry that marks a transitional stage between the Chellean (Abbevillian or Oldowan) and the Acheulean. Louis Leakey identified eleven stages of development in the Chelleo-Acheulean "hand axe culture" in Africa.
