= Mohammad Wissam El-Mortada =

Mohammad Wissam El-Mortada (born 1972) is the Lebanese Minister of Culture, chosen by the Amal Movement to lead the Ministry of Culture (Lebanon).

He has been a judge since 1996 and a member of the Supreme Judicial Council between 2009 and 2018.

He also held the position of professor ad Université La Sagesse between 2008 and 2019 in the Faculty of Economics and Business Administration.

He holds the following judicial positions:

- Presidency of the Chamber of First Instance in Mount Lebanon- Baabda.
- Presidency of the Criminal Court of Mount Lebanon, Investigating Judge of the Judicial Council.
- Member of the Law Development and Good Application Committee.
