= Jean-Marc Bonfils =

French-Lebanese architect (1963–2020)

- Born: 1963; Beirut, Lebanon
- Died: 4 August 2020 (aged 57); Beirut, Lebanon
- Occupation: Architect
- Buildings: East Village building

Jean-Marc Bonfils (1963 – 4 August 2020) was a Lebanese architect of French ethnicity, based in Beirut, known for his work in the city during the rebuilding after the Lebanese Civil War. He was killed by the 2020 Beirut explosion, which occurred near his home.

== Early life and education ==
Bonfils was born in Beirut into a family that settled there from France in the 19th century; his father, Maurice Bonfils, was also a prominent architect in the city. He earned degrees in architecture from the Paris-Villemin School of Architecture, a precursor of the École nationale supérieure d'architecture de Paris-Val de Seine, in 1987, and in history of art from the École du Louvre. He continued his training in London at the Architectural Association School of Architecture.

== Career ==
Bonfils began his career in Paris in 1987, working with Christian de Portzamparc, Alain Sarfati and Jean-Marie Charpentier.

In 1995, he and his father won an international competition for the reconstruction of central Beirut; he returned there and was based there for the remainder of his life, initially working in town planning, for example on pedestrianisation in Beirut and master planning for other cities including Byblos and Baalbeck. After his father's retirement in 2005, he started his own architecture firm, J.M. Bonfils & Associés. Among his projects was work on re-establishing the Lebanese National Library (currently housed at the Faculty of Law of the Lebanese University). He taught at the American University of Beirut and later at the Lebanese Academy of Fine Arts.

His East Village building, in central Beirut's Mar Mikhaël district, consisting of a slim apartment tower above an art gallery and clad partly in dark stone and wood as a reinterpretation of traditional Lebanese architecture, won the 2015 Asia Architecture Award in the housing division. The building also had a vertical garden, which Bonfils created with the intention of replacing a no-longer accessible public garden at the adjacent headquarters of Électricité du Liban. Bonfils himself lived there.

== Death ==
On 4 August 2020, Bonfils was fatally injured in his apartment in the East Village building he designed, by a massive ammonium nitrate explosion at the Port of Beirut. He had been live-streaming his view of the aftermath of a preceding, smaller explosion at the port on Facebook. He was evacuated to the American University of Beirut Medical Center, where he died a few hours later. He was 57.
