= Philippe de Tarrazi =

Lebanese writer and philanthropist

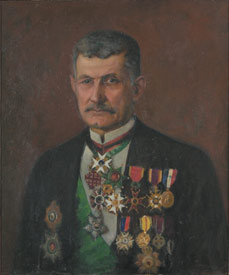
- Born: April 28, 1865; Beirut, Ottoman Empire
- Died: August 7, 1956 (aged 91); Beirut, Lebanon

Viscount Philippe de Tarrazi (Arabic: فِيْلِيْب دِيّ طَرَّازِيّ / ALA-LC: Fîlîb dî Tarrâzî; 28 April 1865 – 7 August 1956), was a polymath, philanthropist, founder of the National Library of Lebanon and a founding member of the Arab Academy of Damascus.

== Life ==
Philippe was born in Beirut to a renowned Assyrian Syriac Catholic merchant family originally from Mosul which had migrated to Aleppo before dispersing between the Levant and Egypt. His father was given the honorary title of viscount by Pope Leo XIII, which he later held. He studied at the patriarchal school and later the Jesuit College. Philippe showed interest in the Syriac, Arabic and French literatures, and authored at least 57 books on these, of which only 25 were published.

De Tarrazi helped victims of the First World War. He was active in Lebanese Phoenicianist cultural circles and was also close to the Assyrian nationalist Naum Faiq.

De Tarrazi was an avid collector of books and publications. His library included an extensive collection of publication from the Near East.

== Legacy ==
The Lebanese National Library was established in 1921, with a donation from Viscount de Tarrazi of twenty thousand books, many rare manuscripts, and the first issues of newspapers from the Near East. De Tarazi's instructions were that his donation should form "the core of what should become the Great Library of Beyrouth." It was placed under the supervision of the Ministry of National Education in 1922. It moved to the Lebanese Parliament building in 1937.
