= Mayrouba =

Mayrouba ميروبا
- Municipality
- Location in Lebanon
- Coordinates: 34°00′41″N 35°46′10″E
- Country: Lebanon
- Governorate: Keserwan-Jbeil
- District: Keserwan

Area
  - Total: 8.23 km^{2} (3.18 sq mi)
- Elevation: 1,300 m (4,300 ft)
- Time zone: UTC+2 (EET)
  - Summer (DST): UTC+3 (EEST)

Mayrouba (Arabic: ميروبا, romanized: Mayrūbā; also spelled Meyrouba or Mairouba) is a village and municipality in the Keserwan District of the Keserwan-Jbeil Governorate in Lebanon. Its average elevation is 1,300 metres (4,300 ft) above sea level and its total land area is 823 hectares. Mayrouba's inhabitants are almost predominantly Maronite Catholic. As of 2008, the village had a school with 50 pupils and seven businesses with over five employees.

There are several Stone Age archaeological sites in the vicinity that have defined the location as the type site of the Mayroubian culture.

== Archaeology ==
Mayrouba I, II, III, IV, V, VI
- Ain-bou-Grasse (Mayrouba III), Ain Berdet (Mayrouba V), "Site Tixier" (Mayrouba VI)
- Interactive map of Mayrouba I, II, III, IV, V, VI
- Periods: Upper Paleolithic
- Cultures: Mayroubian

Site notes
- Excavation dates: 1962
- Archaeologists: Paulist Fathers, Nasrallah, P. H. Gigues, Burkhalter, Fattal, Auguste Bergy, Maurice Tallon, Henri Fleisch, Francis Hours
- Condition: Ruins
- Public access: Yes

=== Mayrouba I ===
Mayrouba I is 14 kilometres (8.7 mi) east northeast of Junie by the way to Faraya. It is a large site on top of a plateau to the north of the village situated in sandstone at an altitude of approximately 1,400 metres (4,600 ft). It was discovered by Paulist Fathers from Harissa. Collections were made from the site by P.R. Gigues and various Jesuits including Maurice Tallon, Auguste Bergy, Francis Hours and Henri Fleisch. Fleisch admitted that it was not the best choice for a type site due to the possibility of mixed industries however he published it as a transitional site with successive occupations between peoples of the Middle Paleolithic and Upper Paleolithic.

Finds of predominantly blue-grey Upper Jurassic flints included an emphasized Upper Paleolithic element with finds of two Emireh points by Lorraine Copeland and R. Khawam in 1965. Artefacts included numerous burins, end scrapers, thick blades, steep scrapers, bladelet cores, tortoise cores, discoid cores, point cores and miniature flake cores. Collections from the site have been dispersed but a large number have been retained by Saint Joseph University.

=== Mayrouba II ===
Mayrouba II is 2 kilometres (1.2 mi) north of Mayrouba found by Francis Hours and determined as a Mayroubian site in a wooded, uncultivated area on sandstone at an altitude of approximately 1,460 metres (4,790 ft).

=== Mayrouba III ===
Mayrouba III (Ain-bou-Grasse) is on the other side of the crest of a hill from Mayrouba I in a wooded area at an altitude of approximately 1,460 metres (4,790 ft). It was found by Francis Hours in 1964 and determined as a Mayroubian site and lies undisturbed amongst pines.

=== Mayrouba IV ===
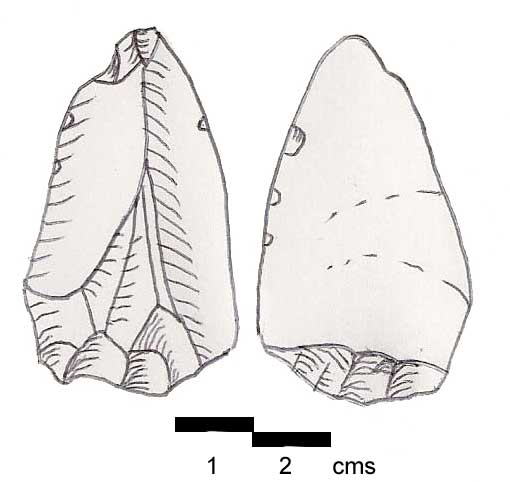
Emireh Point. From Meyrouba VI, Lebanon. Greyish-blue Jurassic flint, patinated to white. Upper Paleolithic.

Mayrouba IV is on a small plateau north of the road between Jebel Mazloum and Mayrouba, east of a track leading to Ain-bou-Grasse, 100 metres (330 ft) west of Mayrouba I. It was found by Francis Hours in 1964 and determined as a Mayroubian site. A collection was made by Hours, Jacques Tixier and Lorraine Copeland in 1965 of mostly cores and burins but including an Emireh point. It lies undisturbed amongst screes.

=== Mayrouba V ===
Mayrouba V (Ain Berdet) is about 2 kilometres (1.2 mi) northwest of Mayrouba at an altitude of approximately 1,293 metres (4,242 ft) on the slopes of a wooded hill. It was found by Francis Hours in 1964, determined as a Mayroubian site and lies undisturbed.

=== Mayrouba VI ===
Mayrouba VI ("Site Tixier") is 100 metres (330 ft) south of Mayrouba I in a wood sloping towards the road to Mayrouba. It was found undisturbed in 1965 by Francis Hours, Jacques Tixier and Lorraine Copeland. The tools found indicated it to be a Mayroubian site and included an Emireh point, they are held by the Museum of Lebanese Prehistory.
