= Tabunian =

Palaeolithic stone tool industry

The Tabunian is a Palaeolithic stone tool industry that is a Near Eastern variant of the Tayacian and Clactonian of Europe. It was excavated in Israel from layer G at the site of Tabun Cave by Dorothy Garrod and layers E, F and G at Umm Qatafa by R. Neuville and later identified as distinct by Francis Clark Howell. The tools of this culture are characterized by a lack of bifaces and use of Levallois technique is absent.
