= Gaby Layoun =

Lebanese politician

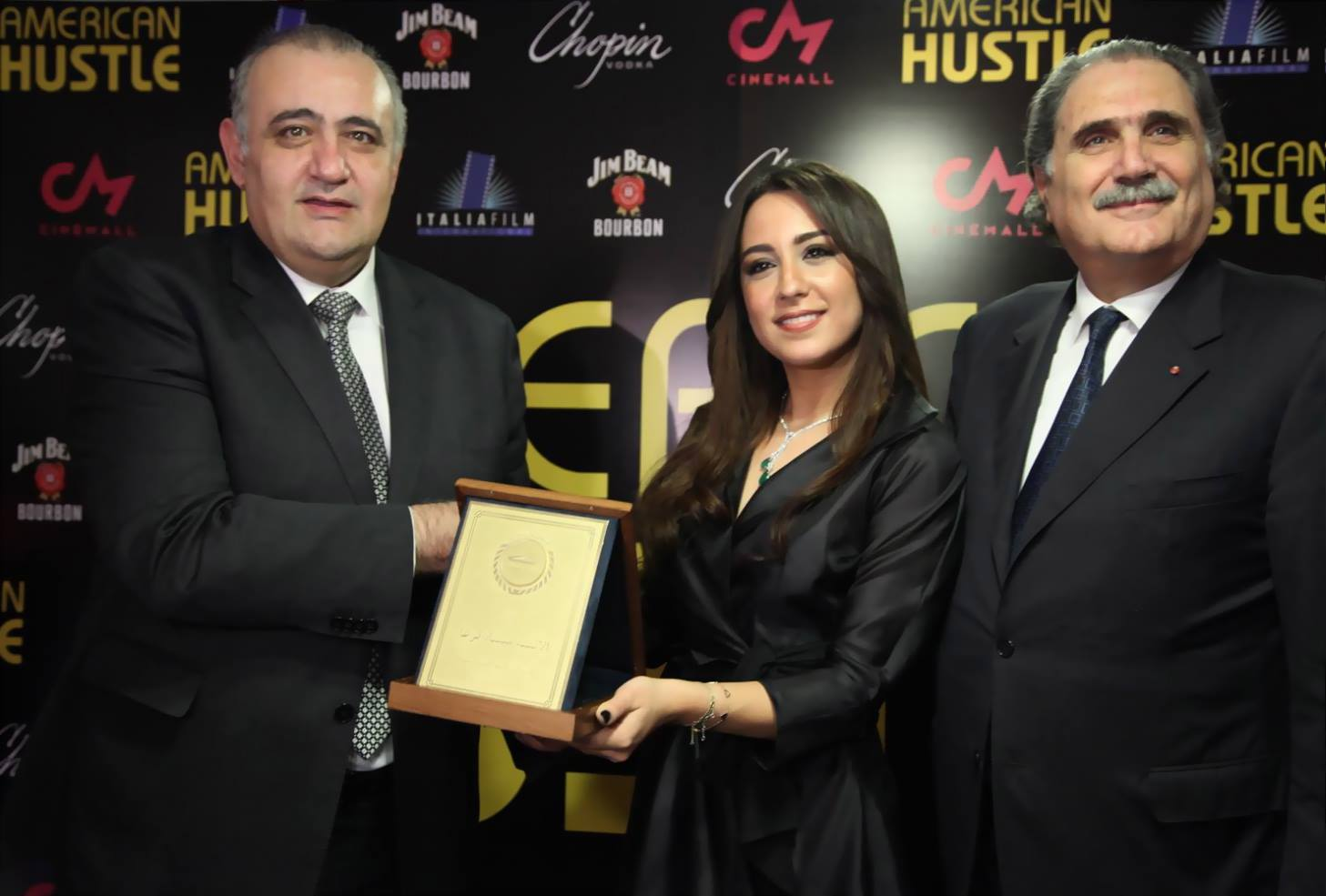
Gaby Layoun presenting the Lebanon Cultural Award to Mayssa Karaa

Gaby Emile Layoun (Arabic: غابي اميل ليون; born 1 November 1964, Zahle) was the Lebanese Minister of Culture, announced as part of the cabinet led by Najib Mikati. He represents the Free Patriotic Movement. Layoun is married and has two children. He holds a diploma in engineering, a Lebanese Baccalaureate in mathematics (1982) and a Sacred Heart of the city of Zahle.

== Phoenician port in Beirut ==
In June 2012, Gaby Layoun came under harsh criticism in the press and from activists concerning the demolition of an alleged Phoenician port of Beirut. Controversy arose on June 27, 2012 when authorization was given to a private company called Venus Towers Real Estate Development Company to destroy the ruins in the construction of three skyscrapers and a garden at site BEY194 in Mina al-Hosn, behind Hotel Monroe in downtown Beirut. The suggested port had been classified as "cultural heritage" by previous minister Salim Wardeh after a report by Hisham Sayegh, a B.A. graduate from the Lebanese University. An international committee of archaeologists was appointed by Layoun, including Hanz Curver. Ralph Pederson a member of the Institute of Nautical Archaeology, now teaching at the University of Marburg in Germany also prepared an expert report for Venus. Both international and expert reports disputed Sayegh's findings and concluded that the site was not a port or dry dock. The data from Sayegh was afterwards dismissed by the head of the excavation department at the ministry of culture Assaad Seif as being not at all reliable with many inconsistencies in the stratigraphy and the dating.

The destruction of archaeological site BEY194 took place two days prior to the publication of Minister Layoun's decision in the official Gazette, leading to claims that he acted in violation of Lebanese law and setting a concerning precedent for similar actions in the future. The ministry maintains that the declassification of the site was done through the legal procedures adopted by the governmental institutions. Hisham Sayegh's contract with the Ministry was not renewed and Sayegh was fired based on a decision of the council of public service disciplinary board. On 27 June he claimed to have resigned in a letter that accused Venus Towers of attempted bribery to falsify scientific information. "I refused with previous culture ministers bribes that have been generously offered by the Venus company, the owner of the land so that we would agree to falsify scientific truth and divert the origin and significance of this discovery at the heart of the capital Beirut".

The Phoenician port or harbor of Beirut has been reliably located under Rue Foch and Rue Allenby. It was excavated and findings were published by Josette Elayi and Hussein Sayegh in 2000, it is now buried under the city.

== Amin Maalouf's House in Badaro ==
Another controversial decision was the one that led to the demolition on Jan 3, 2013 of the house of the celebrated Lebanese writer Amin Maalouf in Beirut's Badaro neighborhood. Although Layoun's initial decision was not to approve the decision to replace the 80-year-old building with a skyscraper, Layoun decided otherwise on Oct. 23, 2012: “The Culture Ministry approves the destruction of the building on plot 3696 in Mazraa since the building belongs to the transitional period of the French mandate and its architecture does not have any unique traditional techniques.” According to the Daily Star newspaper, the building which embodies the "art deco style" characteristic of Italian and French architecture was en vogue in the 1930s and 1940s in Lebanon. The land was purchased in 2011 by the Kettaneh Group which has now demolished the building.

== Roman Gate of Ancient Beirut ==
The most recent unfolding controversy has to do with the decision to continue with the so-called "Landmark project", a project in Riad al-Solh Square (by the French architect Jean Nouvel) that would feature, among others, a 42-storey tower (with hotels and apartments) on a site where archeologists believed to have discovered the Roman gate of ancient Berytus (the Roman name of Beirut) dating back to the 1st century A.D. Based on expert opinion, Mr. Layoun included the site on the historical monuments list which halted the giant mall and hotel project.
