= Lebanese National Library =

Library in Beirut, Lebanon

- المكتبة الوطنية
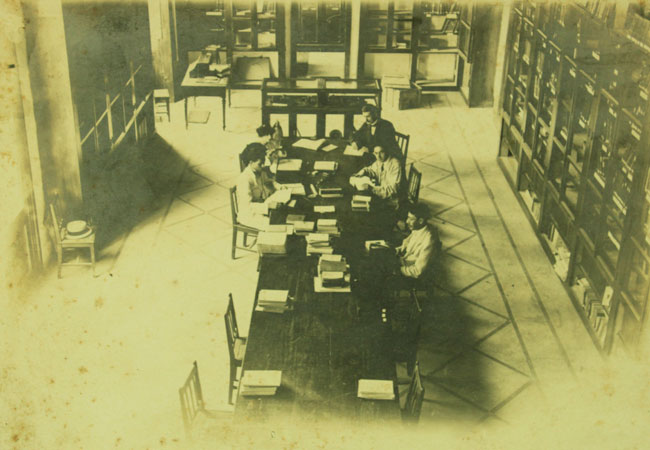
- The Library building
- 33.89471514250132°N 35.4903406379325°E
- Location: Beirut, Lebanon
- Type: Public, National library.
- Established: 1921 (105 years ago)

Collection
- Size: 7,000,000 books, 10,000 drawings, 20,000 maps, 25,000 16th century editions, 8,000 manuscripts, 2,000 Incunabula.
- Legal deposit: yes

Access and use
- Access requirements: Open to anyone of 18 years or older

Other information
- Website: bnl.gov.lb

The Lebanese National Library (Arabic: المكتبة الوطنية), located in Beirut, is the national library of Lebanon. It closed to the public in 1979 due to the Lebanese Civil War, and its surviving collections were placed in storage. Restoration of its volumes and planning for a new site began in 1999.

== History ==
The library was established in 1921, with a donation from Viscount Philippe de Tarrazi of twenty thousand books, many rare manuscripts, and the first issues of national newspapers. De Tarazi's instructions were that his donation should form "the core of what should become the Great Library of Beyrouth." It was placed under the supervision of the Ministry of National Education in 1922. It moved to the Lebanese Parliament building in 1937.

The Lebanese government decreed in 1924 that a copy of every book printed in Lebanon must be submitted, and also provided the library with a staff of eight clerks. A formal copyright deposit law was enacted in 1949 and amended in 1959, but it was never enforced. The government also failed to provide the library with a qualified librarian, or to clearly define its objectives.

The library was repeatedly bombed and looted throughout the Lebanese Civil War. At one time, it had a collection of 100,000 volumes and 2,000 rare manuscripts; an unknown number of these were burned or stolen. In 1979, the building was closed and the surviving manuscripts and documents were stored in the National Archives, and modern printed books were stored in a separate building between 1982 and 1983. The Lebanese National Library only existed in name during the 1990s.

An impassioned plea for a National Library of Lebanon was published in 1998 by the Lebanese Association of Antique Dealers, under the signature of Jean-Pierre Fattal.

The following year, the European Commission decides to send a study mission to Beirut in order to assist the Lebanese government. This mission is immediately followed by an exhibition titled "collective memory" which was presented at the Sursock Museum in the Lebanese Capital. Its objective was to focus on the importance of the library rehabilitation project. The Lebanese government decides then to install the National Library in the Faculty of Law of the Lebanese University, in the district of Sayaneh, according to plans set by the architect Jean-Marc Bonfils (1963 -2020).

Planning for a new site for the National Library began in 1999. The goal was for the library to contain everything published in Lebanon (around 2,000 books annually) and all publications about Lebanon and the Arab world. The project, which also involved the restoration of the collection, was estimated at $7 million, of which $1.5 million was donated by the European Union and the rest pledged by other governments and private donors. By 2006, more than 3,000 volumes had been restored. The collection was again threatened during the 2006 Lebanon War by Israeli bombing near its storage facilities at the Port of Beirut.

== See also ==
- List of national libraries
- List of libraries in Lebanon
