= Traveler's Library =

Traveling library in Tripoli, Lebanon

The Traveler's Library is a traveling library which, as of January 2014 was located in Tripoli, Lebanon.

It was founded in 1972 by Ibrahim Sarouj and was moved to an Ottoman period building in the centre of Tripoli in 1982. The building is listed as a heritage site, with reports that it was once the city's saray, built on top of an old American school. Sarouj claimed to house over eighty thousand titles including rare works in Aramaic, Greek, and Armenian amongst other languages.

In 2012, the building was reportedly subjected to vandalism in connection with plans to demolish and redevelop the property. In January 2014, unknown assailants torched the library, destroying “two thirds of some 80,000 books and manuscripts housed there,” AFP reported.

== See also ==
- List of libraries in Lebanon
