= Zouk Mosbeh =

Zouk Mosbeh زوق مصبح
- Municipality
- Location within Lebanon
- Coordinates: 33°57′18″N 35°36′53″E
- Country: Lebanon
- Governorate: Keserwan-Jbeil
- District: Keserwan

Area
  - Total: 4.53 km^{2} (1.75 sq mi)
- Elevation: 170 m (560 ft)
- Time zone: UTC+2 (EET)
  - Summer (DST): UTC+3 (EEST)
- Dialing code: +961

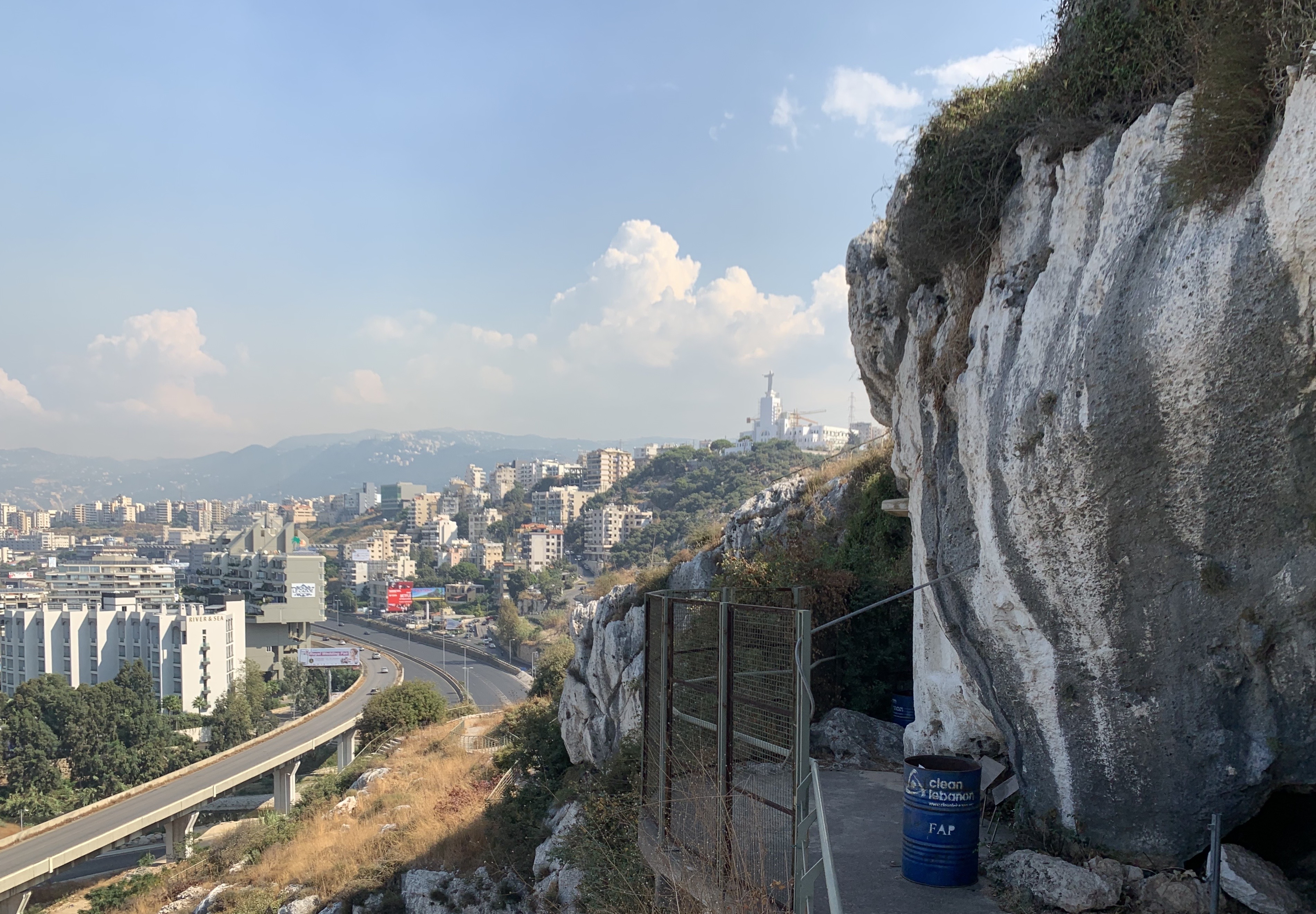
Commemorative stelae of Nahr el-Kalb and view towards Zouk Mosbeh and Zouk Mikael

Zouk Mosbeh (Lebanese Arabic: زوق مصبح, romanized: Zūq Moṣbeḥ) is a town and municipality in the Keserwan District of the Keserwan-Jbeil Governorate in Lebanon. It is located 12 kilometers north of Beirut. Zouk Mosbeh's average elevation is 170 meters above sea level and its total land area is 453 hectares. Its inhabitants are predominantly Maronite Catholics and Christians from other denominations. There are three schools in the town, one public and two private, which together enrolled a total of 4,633 students in 2005–2006. There were 167 businesses with over five employees operating in Zouk Mosbeh as of 2006.

Zouk Mosbeh is well known for a cave called ''the King's Cave'' and is home to the Notre Dame University – Louaize. The town is home to the Hall of Fame Museum which contains fifty silicone models of famous celebrities, several of them animated. It is also home to the Christ the King Convent and the headquarters of the Association for the Protection of the Lebanese Heritage.

== History ==
In the 17th century, the Al-Luwayza or Louaize Monastery (دير سيدة اللويزة, Dayr Sayyidat al-Luwayza) was founded near the town. The Awlad Abi Nawfal supervised it, though it was administered by the Lebanese Order. The Lebanese Council of the Maronite Church took place at this monastery in 1736. Another synod took place in 1808 to discuss and formally ratify the reform proposals by Gandolfini.

In 1838, Eli Smith noted Zuk Musbah as a village located in "Aklim el-Kesrawan, Northeast of Beirut; the chief seat of the Maronites."

== Industrial zone ==
The city is known for its industrial zone which contains numerous shops. It was hit with an explosion in 2007, causing one death and 3 injuries, but was rebuilt and started operating properly since then.

== Bibliography ==
- Robinson, E.; Smith, E. (1841). Biblical Researches in Palestine, Mount Sinai and Arabia Petraea: A Journal of Travels in the year 1838. Vol. 3. Boston: Crocker & Brewster.
