= Assaad Seif =

Lebanese archaeologist (born 1967)

- Born: September 23, 1967 (age 58); Beirut, Lebanon
- Known for: Coordinator of archaeological research and excavations in Lebanon, at the Directorate General of Antiquities
- Scientific career
- Fields: Archaeology
- Workplaces: Ministry of Culture

Assaad Seif (born 23 September 1967) is a Lebanese archaeologist and associate professor in archaeology at the Lebanese University. Former Head of the Scientific Departments and coordinator of archaeological research and excavations in Lebanon, at the Directorate General of Antiquities in Beirut.

== Life ==
Educated at the College Mont La Salle in Ain Saadeh, Seif drove a red cross ambulance during the Lebanese Civil War and took shelter in the National Museum of Beirut when under attack in 1990. In that year he studied for a Bachelor of Arts in Arts and Archaeology at the Lebanese University, Faculty of Human Sciences Section II - Fanar, where in 1995 he was awarded a Master of Arts in Archaeology with a thesis entitled "Catalogue and analysis of the collection of Pre-classic pottery belonging to Walid Jumblatt in the Museum of Beit ed-dîne". He was awarded his PhD in Archaeology from the University of Paris 1 Pantheon-Sorbonne in 2010 for a work entitled "The Spatial Dynamics and the Pottery of the Syro-Palestinian Corridor from the Neolithic to the Middle Bronze Age : The Case of the ʿAkkār". The thesis intended to propose a new approach to the study of the settlement patterns of the ʿAkkār. It aimed to explain the cultural relations of this territory with its regional entourage as well as the interaction between Man and environment in the southern part of the plain from the Neolithic to the Middle Bronze II. The research was structured around three major research axis. The first dealt with the analysis of the ceramic material surveyed in the southern part of the plain in 1997 and 1999 in order to learn the technological, cultural and chronological aspects of this material. Through the parallels, it also aimed to sketch a model of the cultural contacts throughout the region. The second focused on the palaeo-environmental data in order to understand the paleoclimate of the region in general, and the plain in particular with its geomorphology during the mentioned periods. The third axis, based on the use of Geographic Information Systems (GIS), focused on the archaeology of the landscape taking into account the spatial dimension of the plain to better understand the interactions between the sites and their territory.

Upon a special request from the head of the Landscape Archaeology Department (Dr. Sander Van Der Leeuw) at the Sorbonne, he taught MA students in GIS applications in archaeology in 1999. It involved instructing the theories and methods of landscape archaeology applications through the use of GIS and individually instructing participants in the use of the software and how to apply GIS analysis algorithms to data sets prepared during the courses. He has worked on numerous excavations and was scientific director of more than twenty urban excavations mainly around Beirut. He has coordinated and assisted many scientific research projects in specialist fields such as Archaeo-seismology and Geoarchaeology in North Lebanon, along with collaborations with the UNESCO office in Beirut and the DGA.

During his work at the DGA, Seif has coordinated many scientific research projects in collaboration with the Lebanese National Center for Scientific Research (CNRSL) and also directed other research projects dealing with geophysical surveys and heritage management. Lately he has coordinated a project focused on the preventive conservation of Baalbek site and monuments through the use of new technologies, mainly laser scanning, in the aim to develop an integrated risk preparedness strategy for the site. He has two assistant professor positions in two universities, teaching a "History of Architecture" course at NDU (College Notre Dame De Louaize - Zouk Mosbeh) Architecture Department. He also teaches "pottery technology" and "history of the archaeological research in Lebanon" courses at the Lebanese University Archaeology Department.

== Work ==
Since May 1996, Seif has been an archaeologist at the Directorate General of Antiquities (DGA) within the Lebanese Ministry of Culture. Between August 1999 and February 2000, he was acting General Director of the DGA. In January 2007, he was appointed Director and coordinator of the archaeological excavations and research projects in Lebanon (Ministry of Culture, DGA). During 2004, he was Director of the Geophysical Surveying Unit at the Ministry of Culture, DGA and since 2003 was Heritage Management Director and coordinator of the archaeological excavations of the Beirut city center. In 2003, he became Coordinator of the IT training of the DGA personnel and between 2002 and 2008 was put in charge of the automation project of the DGA (in collaboration with Office of the Minister of State for Administrative Reform (Lebanon)). Since 2001, he has been responsible for the GIS Archaeological Map of Lebanon and Coordinator of the Archaeological Map of Tyre. Between 2001 and 2003, he was Coordinator of the CEDRE project on behalf of the Directorate General of Antiquities. In 2000 he became a member of the committee designated by the prime minister for restructuring the Directorate General of Antiquities. Between April 1999 and February 2000, he was also in charge of the international archaeological missions in the DGA. In 1999, he was Cultural Heritage specialist representing Lebanon during the Twenty-third session of the UNESCO World Heritage Bureau (10 July 1999) and the 3rd extraordinary session of the UNESCO World Heritage Committee in Paris UNESCO headquarters (12 July 1999). In 1999, he became a member of the committee designated by the minister of culture for the preparation of 14 September UNESCO Day in Byblos. In 1999, he was a member of the committee designated by the minister of culture for the evaluation of the historic buildings in Beirut. Also in 1999, he was delegated by the minister of culture to represent the DGA in the Delft University of Technology workshop on a Byblos Heritage Management plan with the Collaboration of UNESCO World Heritage Center. Between 1997 and 1998 he was appointed regional co-director of the Heritage Management section in South Lebanon and between 1996 and 1997 as regional co-director of the Heritage Management section in North Lebanon at the Ministry of Culture, DGA.
