= List of libraries in Lebanon =

This is a list of libraries in Lebanon.

== Libraries ==
- Al Sa’eh Library
- Assabil Libraries
- Lebanese National Library
- Traveler's Library
- Baakleen National Library

== See also ==
- List of libraries by country
- Library associations in Lebanon
- Mass media in Lebanon
