= Beirut Rose =

Flowering plant cultivar

- Genus: Rose

The Beirut Rose ('Meideauri'), also known by its French name Rose de Beyrouth, was developed by the French rose producer, Meilland International SA, and unveiled at the ninth Garden Show & Spring Festival, which is held annually at the Beirut Hippodrome in Lebanon.

According to Meilland, the Beirut Rose, a "romantic-looking" bloom, was developed "in tribute to the resilience" of the city of Beirut, and its six-month blooming season symbolizes the "tenacious nature" of Lebanon's capital, which "has resurged from conflict and tragedy time and again".

The pink rose will be planted in the garden of Martyr's Square in Beirut and throughout Lebanon.

The rose is available worldwide in Meilland's catalogue and at the nursery of its agent in Lebanon, Robinson Agri.

== Characteristics ==
- Stems bear five to 25 flowers each
- Blooms have some 75 to 80 petals
- 100% disease resistant
- Blooms continuously from June through December
