= Directorate General of Antiquities =

The Directorate General of Antiquities (DGA; Arabic: المديرية العامة للآثار, romanized: al-Mudīrīyah al-ʻĀmmah lil-Āthār) is a Lebanese government directorate, technical unit of the Ministry of Culture and is responsible for the protection, promotion and excavation activities in all sites of national heritage in Lebanon. Sarkis Khoury is the Director General with other staff including Joumana Nakhle and Laure Salloum.

== Organization ==
The Directorate General is split into several different direct directorates including:

- Directorate of Archaeological Monuments and Built Heritage is responsible for surveys of sites, landmarks, monuments and buildings of archaeological, scientific, geometrical or artistic value, either above or below ground, standing, vanished, scattered or in territorial waters. The directorate is also responsible for listings in the general antiquities inventory, recognized or categorized cultural property lists. It is responsible for proposing draft laws and regulations to protect cultural property along with its appropriation and appropriation of adjacent property guarding and maintaining it. The directorate is involved in publicising and documenting Archaeological properties for further study and making provisions to welcome visitors. It is also responsible for detecting violations of archaeological sites, traditional and historical monuments as well as ordering prosecutions where necessary. They participate in the planning of studies and projects with public and private institutions, universities, scientific institutes and individuals worldwide in contributing to the preservation of heritage and assist in these tasks.
- Directorate of Archaeological Excavations is responsible for searching for archaeological sites and artefacts, excavating, organizing and referencing them. They authorize and monitor requests by local and foreign parties to undertake such operations and are concerned with managing, guarding and preserving sites as well as ensuring research and studies are published appropriately. This directorate also oversees the preservation of archaeological structures and remains during the execution of major construction projects, agricultural works, quarries, public facilities and infrastructure, taking appropriate administrative and legal measures to undertake and control excavation where archaeological remains are uncovered.
- Directorate of Movable Archaeological Property handles the tasks of documenting and inventorying movable objects and antiques found or made within Lebanese territory and territorial waters whether above or below ground, in Directorate controlled repositories, public or private institutions or individuals such as amateurs and antiques traders. It is also responsible for listing moveable property in the general antiquities inventory, recognized or categorized cultural property lists. It is responsible for proposing draft laws and regulations to protect cultural property along with its appropriation and appropriation of adjacent property guarding and maintaining it. The directorate is involved in publicising and documenting movable antiques and objects similar to antiques as well as proposing their categorization, purchase and possession. It is responsible for storing, maintaining properties as well as proposing methods to use, lend and display them and monitoring their trade and transport. It is involved in requests to build new museums for antiques and heritage and coordinate cooperation and exchange between institutions and scientific organizations worldwide in order to provide the fullest benefits from the Directorate's collection in accredited archaeological displays and museums.

== See also ==
- Archaeology in Lebanon
