= Abbevillian =

Early stone age tool culture

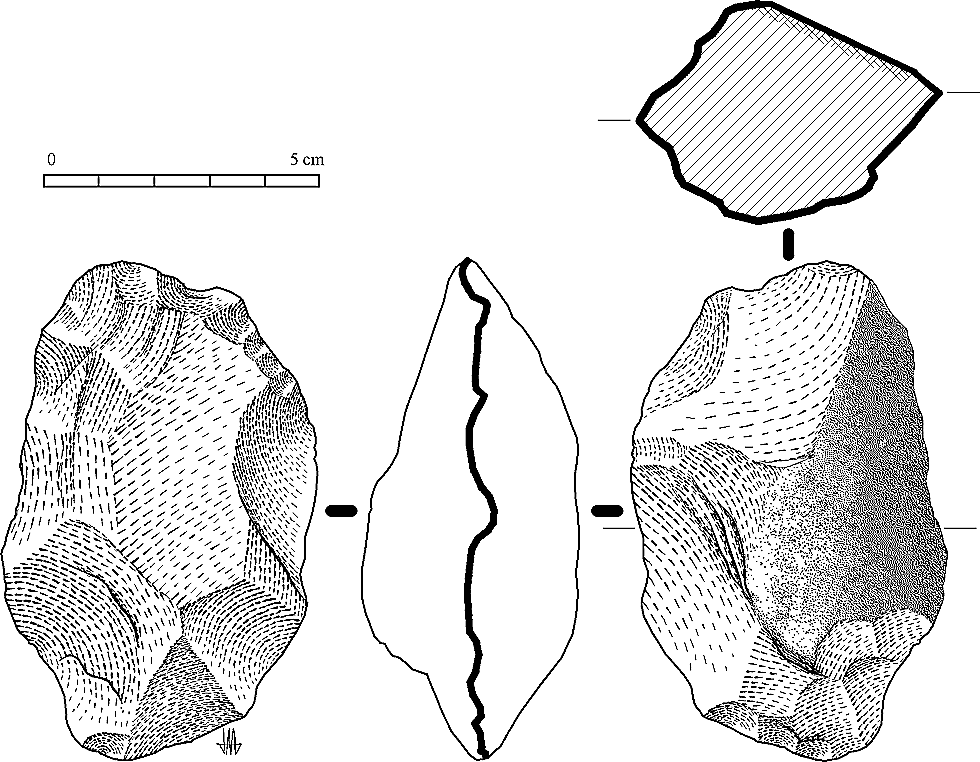
Abbevillian biface flake from the Douro river region near Valladolid, Spain. It is unretouched and is not distinguishable from Olduwan. The one small spot of smaller flaking on one edge may indicate that it is borderline between Olduwan and Acheulean. Both are found in Europe.

Abbevillian (formerly also Chellean) is a term for the oldest lithic industry found in Europe, dated to between roughly 600,000 and 400,000 years ago.

The original artifacts were collected from road construction sites on the Somme river near Abbeville by a French customs officer, Boucher de Perthes. He published his findings in 1836. Subsequently, Louis Laurent Gabriel de Mortillet (1821–1898), professor of prehistoric anthropology at the School of Anthropology in Paris, published (1882) "Le Prehistorique, antiquité de l'homme", in which he was the first to characterize periods by the name of a site.

Chellean included artifacts discovered at the town of Chelles, a suburb of Paris. They are similar to those found at Abbeville. Later anthropologists substituted Abbevillian for Chellean, the latter of which is no longer in use.

Abbevillian tool users were the first archaic humans in Europe, classified as either late Homo erectus as Homo antecessor or as Homo heidelbergensis.

== History ==
The label Abbevillian prevailed until the Leakey family discovered older (yet similar) artifacts at Olduvai Gorge (a.k.a. Oldupai Gorge), starting in 1959, and promoted the African origin of man. Olduwan (or Oldowan) soon replaced Abbevillian in describing African and Asian paleoliths. The term Abbevillian is still used, but it is now restricted to Europe. The label, however, continues to lose popularity as a scientific designation.

Mortillet had portrayed his traditions as chronologically sequential. In the Abbevillian, early Palaeolithic hominins used cores; in the Acheulian, flakes. Olduwan tools, however, indicate that in the earliest Palaeolithic, the distinction between flake and core is less clear. Consequently, there also is a tendency to view Abbevillian as an early phase of Acheulian.

== Provenience of the type ==
The Abbevillian type site is on the 150-foot terrace of the River Somme. Tools found there are rough chipped bifacial handaxes made during the Elsterian Stage of the Pleistocene Ice Age, which covered central Europe between 478,000 and 424,000 years ago.

The Abbevillian is a phase of Olduwan that occurred in Europe near, but not at, the end of the Lower Palaeolithic (2.5 mya. – 2,500,000 years ago). Those who adopt the Abbevillian scheme refer to it as the middle Acheulian, about 600,000-500,000 years ago. Geologically it occurred in the Middle Pleistocene, younger than about 700,000 years ago. It spanned the Günz-Mindel interglacial period between the Günz and the Mindel, but more recent finds of the East Anglian Palaeolithic push the date back into the Günz, closer to the 700,000 ya mark. (Note: An important point to remember is that tool-makers advanced at different rates throughout the globe. For example, the style of tool-making that is called Abbevillian was practiced at a different time period in Africa than in Europe.)

The Abbevillian culture bearers are not believed to have evolved in Europe, but to have entered it from further east. It was thus preceded by the earlier Olduwan of Homo erectus, and the Upper Acheulian, of which Clactonian and Tayacian are considered phases, supplanted it. The Acheulian there went on into the Levalloisian and Mousterian are associated with Neanderthal man.

== Abbevillian sites in Europe ==
To avoid the question of what culture name should be used to describe European artifacts, some, such as Schick and Toth, refer to "non-handaxe" and "handaxe" sites. Handaxes came into use at about the 500,000 ya mark. (Note: Acheulean or later Acheulean, dated to 500,000-100,000 ya.) Non-handaxe sites are often the same sites as handaxe sites, the difference being one of time, or, if geographically different, have no discernible spatial pattern. The physical evidence is summarized in the table below Note that the dates assigned vary widely after 700,000 ya and, except where substantiated by scientific methods, should be viewed as tentative and on the speculative side.

Site	Notes
Arago Cave near the village of Tautavel in the Languedoc-Roussillon region of France.	A community of about 100 individuals discovered over the years in the ongoing excavations of the cave by a team of the Centre Européen de Recherches Préhistoriques de Tautavel under the direction of Henry de Lumley. Excavations began in 1964, the first mandible came to light in 1969, and the first "Tautavel Man" in 1971, though in fact many subsequent Tautavel men and women appeared. The date range is a fairly secure 690,000-300,000 years ago by many methods. The prevailing view is that the fossils are intermediary to the Neanderthals. Tools were found as well.
Barnfield Pit near Swanscombe in Kent, England	Portions of a skull excavated from a gravel pit by Alvin T. Marston in 1935-36 along with handaxes and animal bones. Two more pieces and some charcoal were found in 1955 by John Wymer. Estimated date 250,000 ya.
Boxgrove, outside Chichester, Great Britain.	Shin bone & two teeth found in 1994 and 1996 in a quarry, with butchered animal bones and handaxes, ca. 500,000 ya.
Mauer near Heidelberg, Germany	Mauer 1 (lower jaw & tooth) discovered 1907 in a gravel pit. Dated to 600,000-250,000 ya.
Petralona cave in Chalcidice, Greece.	Skull found in a cave with animal bones, stone tools and evidence of fire in 1960. Studied by Aris Poulianos, given various dates. ESR date range is 240,000-160,000, but all other fossils associated indicate a much older date circa 800,000.
Sima de los huesos, "pit of bones", a chimney site in a cave, one of many fossil hominin sites in the hills of Atapuerca, Castile-Leon, Spain	About 4,000 Hominin bones from which about 30 individuals have been reconstructed since the mid-1970s. Bones of carnivores are mixed in and a handaxe was found in 1998. Date is 500,000-350,000 ya.
Steinheim an der Murr, north of Stuttgart, Germany.	Skull found in 1933 by Karl Sigrist, currently dated to about 250,000 ya.
Vértesszőlős, Vértesszőlős, near Budapest	Occipital bone and a few teeth excavated 1964-65 in a quarry site that was in the open and used for butchery by László Vértes. Human fossils were with a hearth, dwelling, tools, footprints, plant and animal fossils.

== See also ==
- Timeline of glaciation
- List of human fossils
