= Ivan Franko Park (Lviv) =

Park in Lviv, Ukraine

Coordinates: 49°50′18″N 24°01′11″E

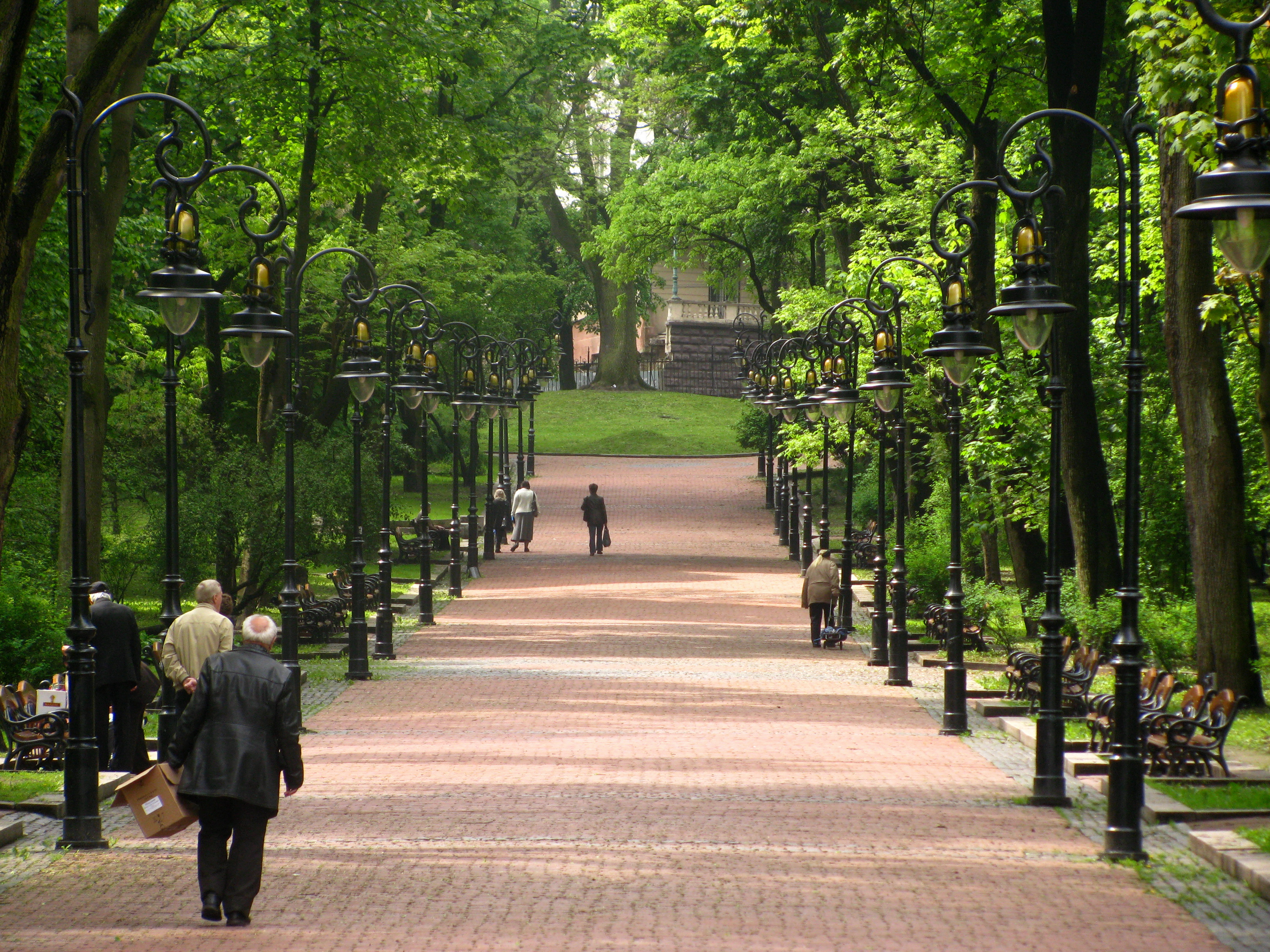
Ivan Franko Park

Ivan Franko Park (Парк імені Івана Франка), formerly known as Kościuszko Park and the Jesuit Gardens, is a park in Lviv, Ukraine. It is the oldest park in the country.

== History ==
In the 16th century, the land of the park was the property of the Szolc-Wolfowicz family and Antonio Massari, a Venetian consul. They passed the property to a Jesuit order. The park's former name Jesuit Gardens derived from that history. The monastic residents built a brewery and an inn with the elegance of Italian refinery. During a siege by Moscow's army in 1655, a rampart wall was built around the property. By the end of the 18th century, Joseph II, Holy Roman Emperor, following his policy of confiscating monastic holdings, ordered the establishment of a municipal park in Lviv. In 1799, restaurateur Johann Höcht leased the park and opened a French resort on the site. It was redesigned by horticulturist Karl Bauer as a landscaped park in 1855.

== Location ==
The Ivan Franko Park (Lviv, Ukraine) is located on a hillside of the Lviv Heights between Lystopadovoho Chynu and Krushelnytskoi Streets. It is near Lviv University, which is also named after Ivan Franko. The park fills a parallelogram between Marshalkovska, Mitskevych, Mateyko and Krashevsky Streets (presently, Universitetska, Lystopadovoho Chynu, Mateyko, and Krushelnytskoi). A large statue of Ivan Franko towers over the park.

== Ecosystem ==
The park contains maples, oaks, linden, chestnut, and other trees of varying ages.
