= Beirut Hippodrome =

Ancient Roman circus in Beirut, Lebanon

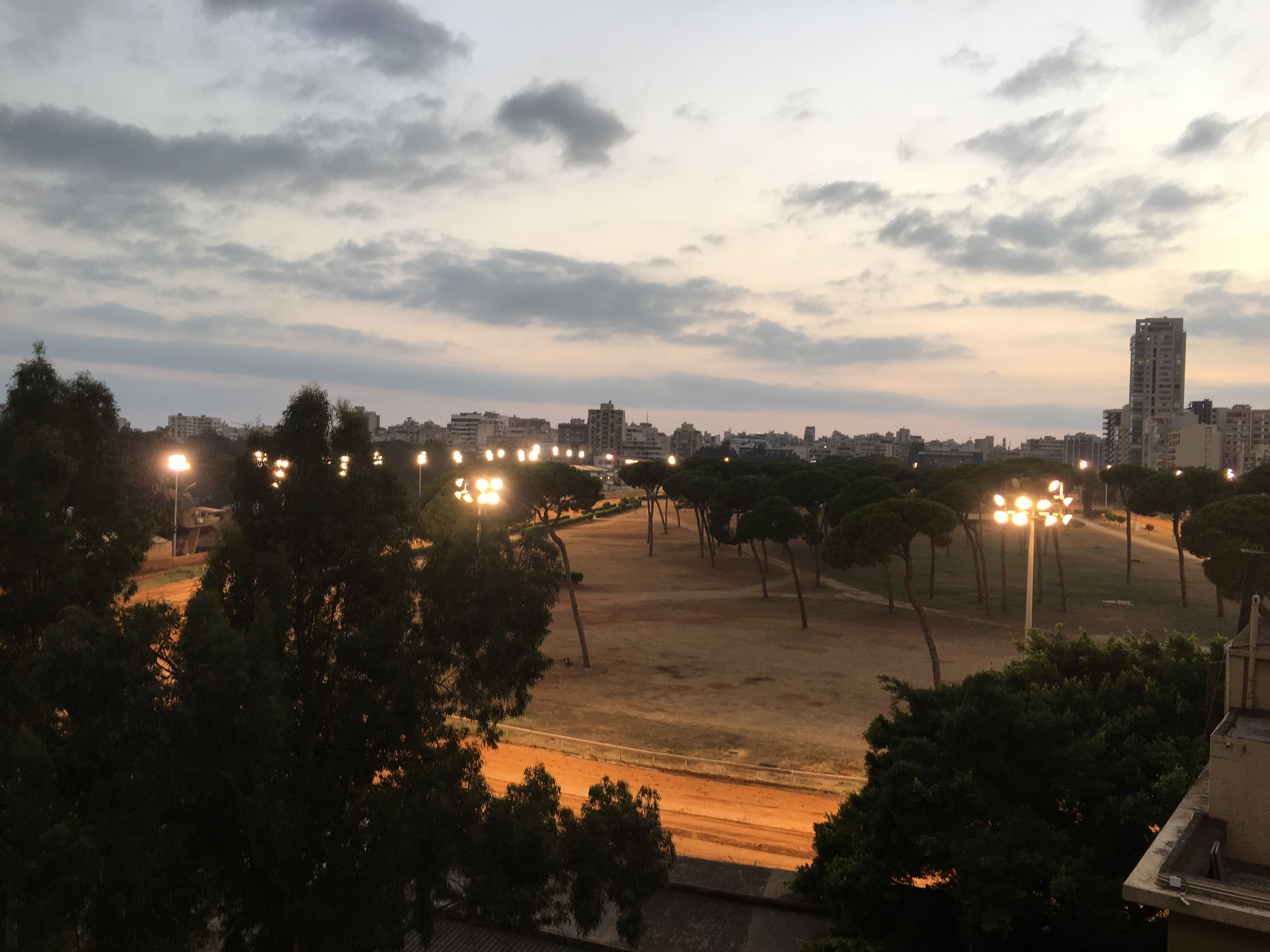
Beirut Hippodrome in 2016

Beirut, the capital of Lebanon, is home to two hippodromes, a historic one from the Roman era and a modern one that was built in the late 19th century.

== Roman Hippodrome of Beirut ==
The Roman Hippodrome, which occupies 3500 m^{2} in the Beirut Central District, was discovered in 1988. The Roman Hippodrome of Beirut was the second to be discovered in Lebanon after the Tyre Hippodrome, making Lebanon home to two of the five known Roman hippodromes in the Levant, the other three being in Caesarea in Israel, Jerash in Jordan, and Bosra in Syria. The Roman Hippodrome of Beirut is considered to have been the grandest of the five, having amphitheaters that are several meters high and a race track, which is more than 90 meters long.

=== Preservation ===
In 2009, Culture Minister Tamam Salam, had the site listed officially in the general inventory of historic buildings, ruling that it should be preserved in situ and turned into a tourist landmark.

According to an article appearing in the French daily, L'Orient-Le Jour, Gaby Layoun, the Culture Minister at the time, approved in March 2012 plans for a luxury residential complex to be built over the ruins of Beirut's Roman Hippodrome, bypassing the recommendations of three of his predecessors: Tarek Mitri, Salim Wardé, and Tammam Salam. The three previous Culture Ministers, Mitri, Wardé, and Salam criticized Layoun's move and reiterated the importance of protecting and preserving the archeological site. A march to protest the destruction of the hippodrome took place on March 24, 2012. The Association for the Protection of the Lebanese Heritage (APLH) organized the protest as an attempt to reverse the Culture Ministry's decision to allow the building over the hippodrome. Following the litigation brought by the Association for the Protection of Lebanese Heritage (APLH), the court suspended on May 31, 2012, the Culture Ministry's decision, N˚ 849, to dismantle the Roman Hippodrome that would have allowed for the construction of a building project on the site. The site is protected for now.

== Hippodrome du parc de Beyrouth ==
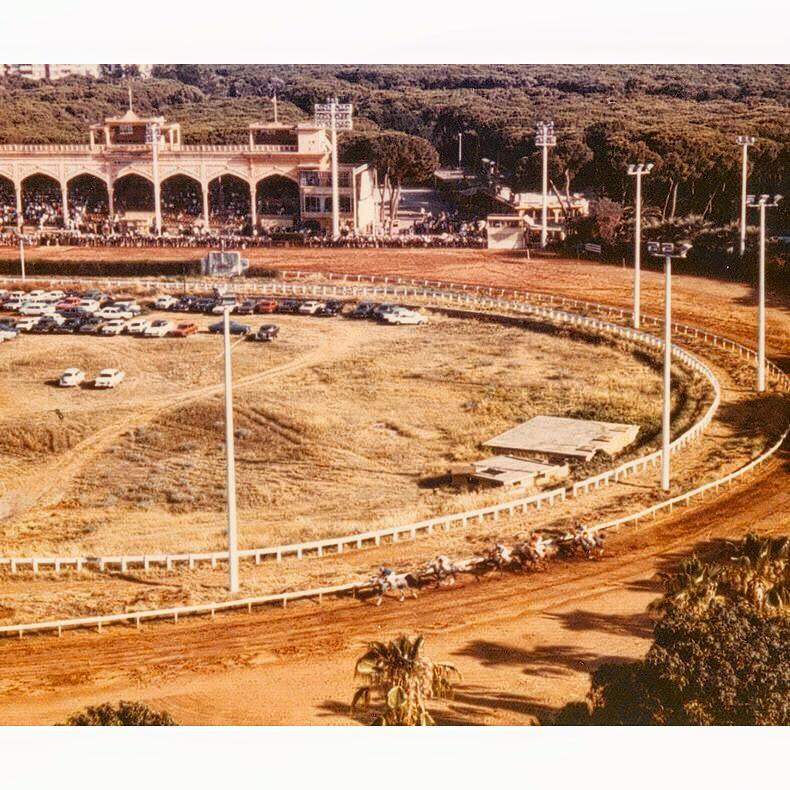
Beirut Hippodrome in 1973

Location of the Beirut Hippodrome

The current Hippodrome du parc de Beyrouth is a horse-racing facility in Beirut's Horsh district adjacent to Badaro. In 1893, the “al-Marmah” hippodrome was founded, in the town of Bir Hassan. Wealthy Beirutis wished to create a club-complex that included a western style hippodrome and casino. In 1916, the wali of Beirut Azmi Bey, who supported the club project, entrusted its creation to Alfred Sursock, who financed the project. Sursock signed an agreement with the municipality of Beirut for the redevelopment of 600,000 square meters of Beirut pine forest. The project was to include a public causeway, a cinema, a casino, and the hippodrome. The hippodrome was completed in 1921 by Amine and Bahjat Abdelnour while the casino structure became the seat of the French mandate authorities in Lebanon.

In the 1960s, the Beirut Hippodrome became one of the busiest race tracks in the world, holding races twice a week, 52 weeks a year.

The Israeli army occupied the hippodrome during the Invasion of Lebanon in 1982. The Israeli army entered the hippodrome on August 4.

The hippodrome also hosts annual The Garden Show & Spring Festival, which attracts more than 160 exhibitors and over 24,000 international visitors. At the 2012 Garden Show & Spring Festival, the French rose producer, Meilland International, presented to the public the Beirut Rose, which was cultivated in tribute to Lebanon's capital.
