= Salim Wardeh =

Salim Wardeh سليم وردة
- Born: Salim Aziz Wardeh; October 1, 1968 (age 58); Zahle, Lebanon
- Predecessor: Tammam Salam
- Political party: Lebanese Forces
- Spouse: Nidal Hakim
- Children: Daughter: Macy Wardeh(1996) Son: Aziz Wardeh(1998)
- Parent(s): Aziz Wardeh; Yolande Estephan
- Website: www.salimwardy.com

Salim Wardeh (Arabic: سليم وردة) (born October 1, 1968, in Zahle, Lebanon) was the Minister of Culture in Lebanon until June 2011, when he was replaced by Gaby Layoun. Wardeh is Greek-Catholic and is a member of the Lebanese Forces which in turn is a member of the March 14 Alliance. Wardeh is a member of the board of directors of Tell Shiha Hospital. He also holds Australian citizenship.

== Business career ==
He is the General Manager of Solifed, a family business specializing in making wine that was founded in 1971 but dates back to 1893.

== Personal life ==
He is married to Nidal Hakim and has two children Macy(1996) and Aziz(1998)

== Miscellaneous ==
He underwent a failed kidnapping attempt in 1977. The kidnappers wanted to ask for ransom from Wardeh's wealthy business family.

== See also ==
- Lebanese government of November 2009
- Lebanese Forces
- March 14 Alliance
- Lebanese Christians
- Lebanese Australians
- List of Lebanese people
- Lebanese wine

== Notes ==
Alternative transliterations used in the media: Warde, Wardy.

Political offices
Preceded by Tammam Salam	Minister of Culture; 09 November 2009 - June 2011 –	Succeeded by Gabi Lyon
