= Tayacian =

Paleolithic stone tool

The Tayacian is a Palaeolithic stone tool industry that is a variant of the Mousterian. It was first identified as distinct by Abbé Breuil from the site of La Micoque in Les-Eyzies-de-Tayac although since then the cave at Fontéchevade has become the "reference site for this industry".

Tools from this culture have been excavated in a stratigraphic column in the Syria area.
