= Francis Hours =

Reverend Father Francis Hours, born 1921 in France and died 1987, was a French Jesuit archaeologist known for his work on prehistory in the Levant.

He gave the Lebanese a real scientific framework for prehistoric research and worked excavating various sites including J'ita II. He was also an author of many publications, some in collaboration with international archaeologists such as Jacques Cauvin and Lorraine Copeland. One of his most notable works was the Atlas des sites du proche orient (14000-5700 BP) (Atlas of Near East sites) which he started in 1974. This work has been completed and added to by various scholars including Oliver Aurenche and is now an online application of the Maison de l'Orient et de la Méditerranée.

== Selected bibliography ==
- Francis Hours., Le paléolithique et l'épipaléolithique de la Syrie et du Liban, Dar El-Machreq, 154 pages, 1992.
- Lorraine Copeland, Francis Hours., The Hammer on the rock: studies in the early palaeolithic of Azraq, Jordan, Volume 1, B.A.R., 482 pages, 1989.
- Francis Hours, Olivier Aurenche, Marie-Claire Cauvin, Paul Sanlaville., Préhistoire du levant: processus des changements culturels : hommage à Francis Hours : colloque international CNRS (30 mai-4 juin 1988), Maison de l'Orient Méditerranéen (Lyon), Éditions du Centre National de la Recherche Scientifique, 501 pages, 1990.
- Francis Hours., Les civilisations du Paléolithique, Presses universitaires de France, 127 pages, 1982.
- Francis Hours., Du néolithique à la bible: mémoire de l'humanité, Associations des Facultés catholiques de Lyon, 110 pages, 1986.
- Francis Hours., Atlas des sites du proche orient: (14000-5700 BP), Maison de l'Orient, 522 pages, 1994.
