= Save Beirut Heritage =

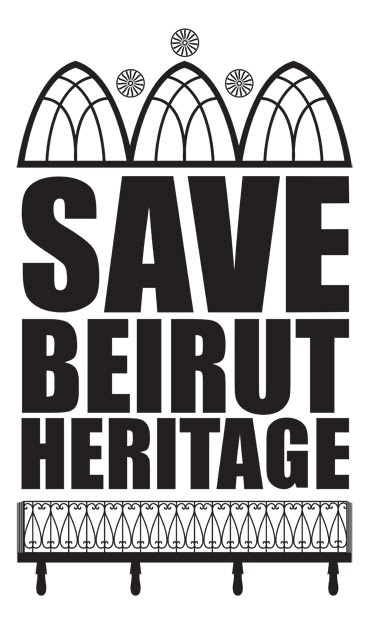
Save Beirut Heritage Logo

Save Beirut Heritage (also known as Save Beirut's Heritage) is a cultural heritage organization based in Beirut, Lebanon.

The organization was founded in 2010 with the aims to preserve architectural heritage within Beirut, which has come under increased threat of destruction through rampant urbanization. The organization started as a group on Facebook, highlighting and vocalising the dangers facing Beirut's ancient sites and traditional buildings. The group now has over fourteen thousand members and operates a twenty-four-hour hotline for the city's residents to call if they fear a building may be in danger from demolition or construction activities.

The organization has organized several petitions and assisted with public demonstrations to protest and protect historic buildings. Their efforts have resulted in the Ministry of Culture issuing a halt order on their demolition. The organization encourages people in the city to monitor properties for illegal demolition and highlights the different ploys used by developers to try and tear down these buildings.

Interviewed by The New York Times, the organization's co-founder and spokesman, Giorgio Tarraf said “These old buildings are not only pretty, they are financially viable, tourists want to come and see our old city, they don’t want to see towers. They can see towers anywhere.” He also spoke of a survey conducted by the government in the 1990s that cataloged more than one thousand historic buildings in Beirut. “Today we estimate the number of remaining traditional buildings to be less than 300, so you can see how dramatic the demolition is, how fast our old city is being transformed.”

Speaking to the Associated Press, activist and spokesman Naji Raji said: “Modernization should not be at the expense of history.”
