= Sarcophagus of Eshmunazar II =

6th-century BC Phoenician royal coffin

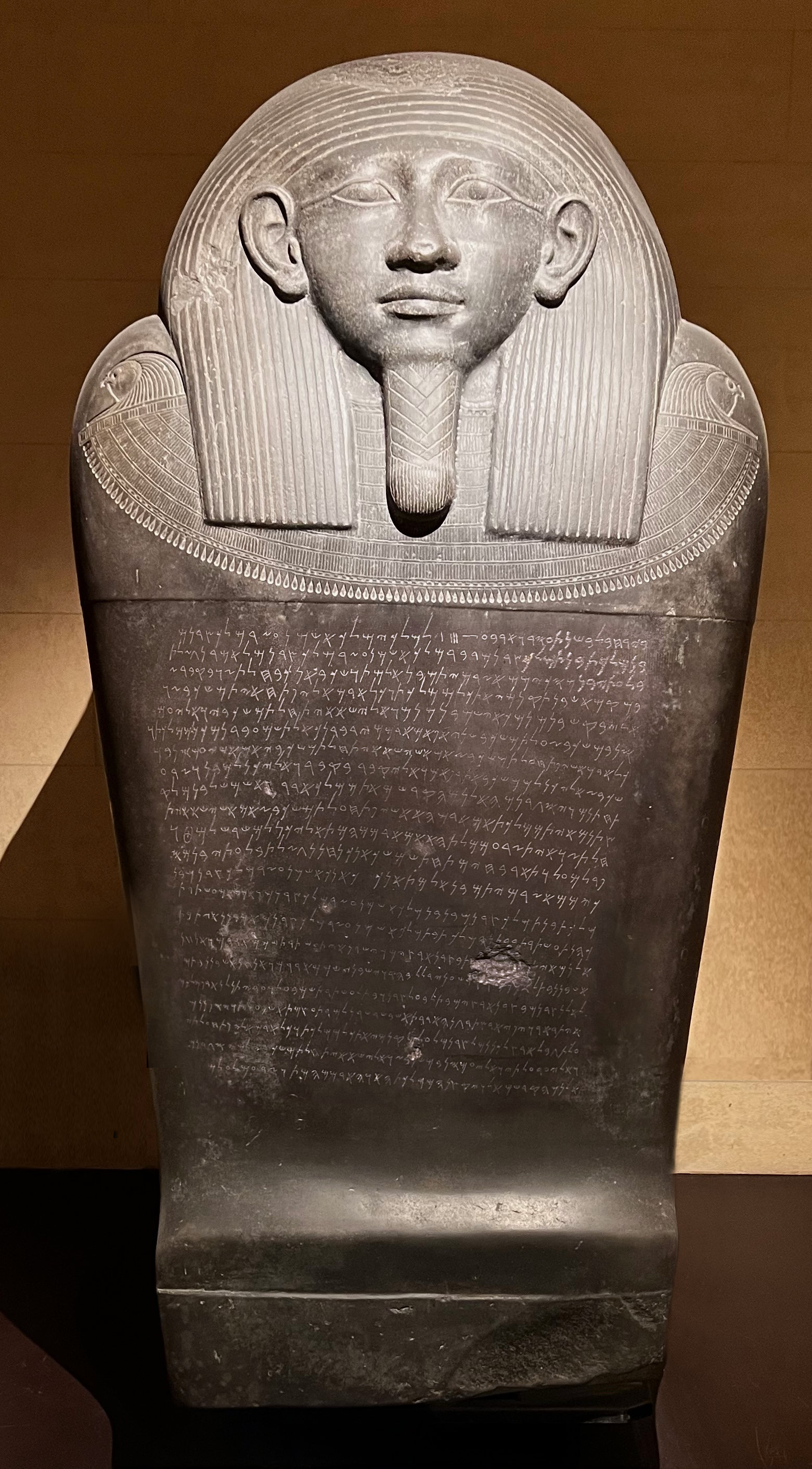
- The sarcophagus at the Louvre, 2022
- Material: Amphibolite
- Length: 2.56 m (8.4 ft)
- Height: 1.19 m (3.9 ft)
- Width: 1.25 m (4.1 ft)
- Writing: Phoenician language
- Created: 6th-century BC
- Period/culture: Achaemenid Phoenicia
- Discovered: 19 January 1855; Magahret Abloun [Cavern of Apollo], Sidon, modern-day Lebanon; 33°33′07″N 35°22′25″E
- Discovered by: Alphonse Durighello
- Present location: The Louvre, Paris
- Identification: AO 4806
- Language: Phoenician
- Culture: Ancient Egyptian, Phoenician

The sarcophagus of Eshmunazar II is a 6th-century BC sarcophagus unearthed in 1855 in the grounds of an ancient necropolis southeast of the city of Sidon, in modern-day Lebanon, that contained the body of Eshmunazar II (Phoenician: 𐤀𐤔𐤌𐤍𐤏𐤆𐤓 ʾšmnʿzr, r. c. 539 – c. 525 BC), Phoenician King of Sidon. One of only three Ancient Egyptian sarcophagi found outside Egypt – the other two belonged to Eshmunazar's father King Tabnit and to a woman, possibly Eshmunazar's mother Queen Amoashtart – it was likely carved in Egypt from local amphibolite, and captured as booty by the Sidonians during their participation in Cambyses II's conquest of Egypt in 525 BC. The sarcophagus has two sets of Phoenician inscriptions, one on its lid and a partial copy of it on the sarcophagus trough, around the curvature of the head. The lid inscription was of great significance upon its discovery, as it was the first Phoenician language inscription to be discovered in Phoenicia proper and the most detailed Phoenician text ever found anywhere up to that point, and is today the second longest extant Phoenician inscription, after the Karatepe bilingual.

The sarcophagus was discovered by Alphonse Durighello, a diplomatic agent in Sidon engaged by Aimé Péretié, the chancellor of the French consulate in Beirut. The sarcophagus was sold to Honoré de Luynes, a wealthy French nobleman and scholar, and was subsequently removed to the Louvre after the resolution of a legal dispute over its ownership.

More than a dozen scholars across Europe and the United States rushed to translate the sarcophagus inscriptions after its discovery, many noting the similarities between the Phoenician language and Hebrew. The translation allowed scholars to identify the king buried inside, his lineage, and his construction feats. The inscription warns against disturbing Eshmunazar II's place of repose. It also recounts that the "Lord of Kings", the Achaemenid king, granted Eshmunazar II the territories of Dor, Joppa, and Dagon in recognition for his services.

The discovery led to great enthusiasm for archaeological research in the region and was the primary reason for Renan's 1860–1861 Mission de Phénicie, the first major archaeological mission to Lebanon and Syria. Today it remains one of the highlights of the Louvre's Phoenician collection.

== Eshmunazar II ==
Eshmunazar II (Phoenician: 𐤀𐤔𐤌𐤍𐤏𐤆𐤓 ʾšmnʿzr, a theophoric name meaning 'Eshmun helps') was the Phoenician King of Sidon, reigning c. 539 BC to c. 525 BC. He was the grandson of King Eshmunazar I and a vassal king of the Achaemenid Empire. Eshmunazar II succeeded his father, Tabnit I, on the throne of Sidon. Tabnit I ruled briefly before his death, and his sister-wife, Amoashtart, acted as an interregnum regent until the birth of Eshmunazar II. Amoashtart then ruled as Eshmunazar II's regent until he reached adulthood. Eshmunazar II, however, died prematurely at age 14 during the reign of Cambyses II of Achaemenid Persia, and was succeeded by his cousin Bodashtart. Eshmunazar II, like his mother, father and grandfather, was a priest of Astarte. Temple building and religious activities were important for the Sidonian kings to demonstrate their piety and political power. Eshmunazar II and his mother, Queen Amoashtart, constructed new temples and religious buildings dedicated to Phoenician gods such as Baal, Astarte, and Eshmun.

== History ==
=== Phoenician funerary practices ===
The Phoenicians emerged as a distinct culture on the Levantine coast in the Late Bronze Age (c. 1550 – c. 1200 BC) as one of the successor cultures to the Canaanites. They were organized into independent city-states that shared a common language, culture, and religious practices. They had, however, diverse mortuary practices, including inhumation and cremation.

Archaeological evidence of elite Achaemenid period burials abounds in the hinterland of Sidon. These include inhumations in underground vaults, rock-cut niches, and shaft and chamber tombs in Sarepta, Ain al-Hilweh, Ayaa, Magharet Abloun, and the Temple of Eshmun in Bustan el-Sheikh. Elite Phoenician burials were characterized by the use of sarcophagi, and a consistent emphasis on the integrity of the tomb. Surviving mortuary inscriptions from that period invoke deities to assist with the procurement of blessings, and to conjure curses and calamities on whoever desecrated the tomb.

The first record of the discovery of an ancient necropolis in Sidon was made in 1816 by English explorer and Egyptologist William John Bankes. (Note: Bankes, who was the guest of British adventurer and archaeologist Hester Stanhope, visited the vast necropolis that was accidentally discovered in 1814, in Wadi Abu Ghiyas at the foot of the towns of Bramieh and Hlaliye, northeast of Sidon. He sketched the layout of one of the sepulchral caves, made faithful watercolor copies of its frescoes, and removed two fresco panels, which he sent to England. The panels are now in the National Trust and County Record Office in Dorchester)

=== Modern discovery ===
The sarcophagus of Eshmunazar II was discovered on 19 January 1855 (Note: The date of the discovery figures at the top of the copy of the sarcophagus inscription made by Van Dyke (p. 380). Other sources provide a later date (see Jidéjian).) by the workmen of Alphonse Durighello, an agent of the French consulate in Sidon hired by Aimé Péretié, an amateur archaeologist and the chancellor of the French consulate in Beirut. Durighello's men were digging on the plains southeast of the city of Sidon in the grounds of an ancient necropolis (dubbed Nécropole Phénicienne by French Semitic philologist and biblical scholar Ernest Renan). The sarcophagus was found outside a hollowed-out rocky mound that was known to locals as Magharet Abloun ('the Cavern of Apollo'). It had originally been protected by a vault, of which some stones remained in place. One tooth, a piece of bone, and a human jaw were found in the rubble during the sarcophagus extraction, showing that the remains of Eshmunazar II had been robbed in antiquity.

Cornelius Van Alen Van Dyck, an American missionary physician, made it to the scene and made a transcript of the inscription which was first published on 11 February 1855 in The United States Magazine.

On 20 February 1855, Durighello informed Péretié of the find. Durighello had taken advantage of the absence of laws governing archaeological excavation and the disposition of the finds under the Ottoman rule, and had been involved in the lucrative business of trafficking archaeological artifacts. Under the Ottomans, it sufficed to either own the land or to have the owner's permission to excavate. Any finds resulting from digs became the property of the finder. To excavate, Durighello had bought the exclusive right from the land owner, the Mufti of Sidon, Mustapha Effendi.

=== Ownership dispute ===
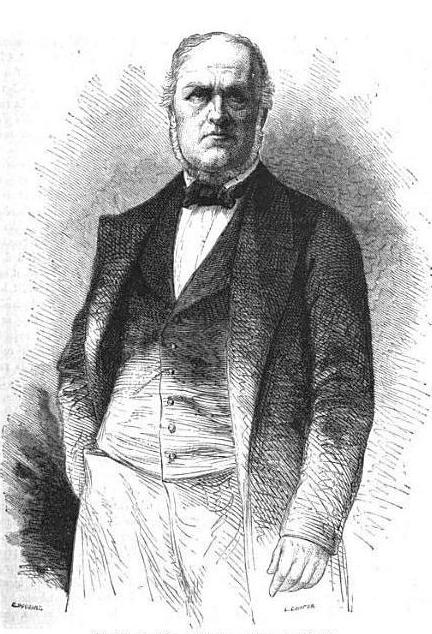
Honoré de Luynes bought the sarcophagus and donated it to the Louvre. Today, the sarcophagus is one of the highlights of the Louvre's Phoenician collection. (Note: A 2019 publication by the Louvre writes: French: "Référence constante, repère immuable, le sarcophage d'Eshmunazor est l'une des œuvres phares de la collection phénicienne du Louvre, autour duquel la collection s'est développée et organisée. Certes sa taille et sa corpulence massive suffisent à attirer l'attention, mais son intérêt est surtout d'ordre épigraphique: exceptionnelle par sa longueur comme par l'ampleur des informations historiques qu'elle contient, la graphie de l'inscription gravée sur ce sarcophage a été considérée comme la forme classique de l'écriture phénicienne.", lit. 'A constant reference, an immutable landmark, the sarcophagus of Eshmunazor is one of the highlights of the Phoenician collection at the Louvre, around which the collection has been developed and organized. Admittedly, its length and breadth are enough to attract attention, but its importance is above all epigraphical: exceptional for its length as well as for the extent of the historical information it contains, the script of the inscription engraved on this sarcophagus has been considered the classic form of Phoenician writing.')

Durighello's ownership of the sarcophagus was contested by the British vice-consul general in Syria, Habib Abela, who claimed he had entered into agreements with the workers and the landowner to assign and sell him the rights to any discoveries. (Note: From the minutes of the dispute resolution meeting of 24 April 1855: French: "Le vingt-trois du même mois, jour de Mardi, Monsieur Habib Abella met appostion à l'enlèvement par Mr. Peretié dudit Sarophage se prévalant en qualité de cessionnaire, de titres et droits qui lui avaient eté conférés en vertu: (1) D'une convention verbale passée entre lui et les ouvriers qui auraient trouvé le Sarcophage; (2) D'une cession qui lui aurait été faite par Aly Efendi, des droits qui pourraient lui revenir sur le Sarcophage, comme l'ayant découvert; (3) D'une vente, qui lui aurait été faite dudit Sarcophage par Moustafa Effendi proprietaire du terrain dans lequel le sarcophage a été trouvé.", lit. 'On Tuesday 23rd of the same month, Habib Abella opposed the removal by Peretié of the said Sarophagus, claiming himself as assignee, with the titles and rights that had been conferred on him by virtue of: (1) a verbal agreement made between him and the workers who found the Sarcophagus; (2) an assignment of rights made to him by Aly Effendi over the Sarcophagus as if he had discovered it; (3) a sale, made to him of the said Sarcophagus by Moustafa Effendi, owner of the land on which the sarcophagus was found.') The matter quickly took a political turn; in a letter dated 21 April 1855 the director of the French national museums, Count Émilien de Nieuwerkerke, requested the intervention of Édouard Thouvenel, the French ambassador to the Ottomans, stating that "It is in the best interest of the museum to possess the sarcophagus as it adds a new value at a time in which we start studying with great zeal Oriental antiquities, until now unknown in most of Europe." A commission was appointed by the governor of the Sidon Eyalet, Wamik Pasha, to look into the case, and, according to the minutes of the meeting dated 24 April 1855, the dispute resolution was transferred to a commission of European residents that unanimously voted in favor of Durighello.

The United States Magazine reported on the issue of the legal dispute:

In the meantime, a controversy has arisen in regard to the ownership of the discovered monument, between the English and French Consuls in this place, one having made a contract with the owner of the land, by which he was entitled to whatever he should discover in it; and the other having engaged an Arab to dig for him, who came upon the sarcophagus in the other consul's limits, or, as the Californians would say, within his "claim".

— United States Magazine correspondent, 1855, p. 379

Péretié purchased the sarcophagus from Durighello and sold it to wealthy French nobleman and scholar Honoré de Luynes for £400. De Luynes donated the sarcophagus to the French government to be exhibited in the Louvre.

=== Removal to the Louvre ===
Péretié rushed the sarcophagus' laborious transportation to France. The bureaucratic task of removing the sarcophagus to France was facilitated with the intervention of Ferdinand de Lesseps, then the French consul general in Alexandria, and the French minister of education and religious affairs, Hippolyte Fortoul. During the transportation to the Sidon port, the citizens and the governor of Sidon gathered, escorted, and applauded the convoy; they adorned the sarcophagus with flowers and palm branches while 20 oxen, assisted by French sailors, dragged the carriage to the port. At the wharf, the crew of the French navy corvette Sérieuse loaded the sarcophagus' trough, and then its lid, onto a barge, before lifting it to the ship. The commander of Sérieuse, Delmas De La Perugia, read an early translation of the inscriptions, explaining the scientific importance and historical significance of the cargo to his crew.

The sarcophagus of King Eshmunazar II is housed in the Louvre's Near Eastern antiquities section in room 311 of the Sully wing. It was given the museum identification number of AO 4806.

Maps from Renan's 1864 Mission de Phénicie

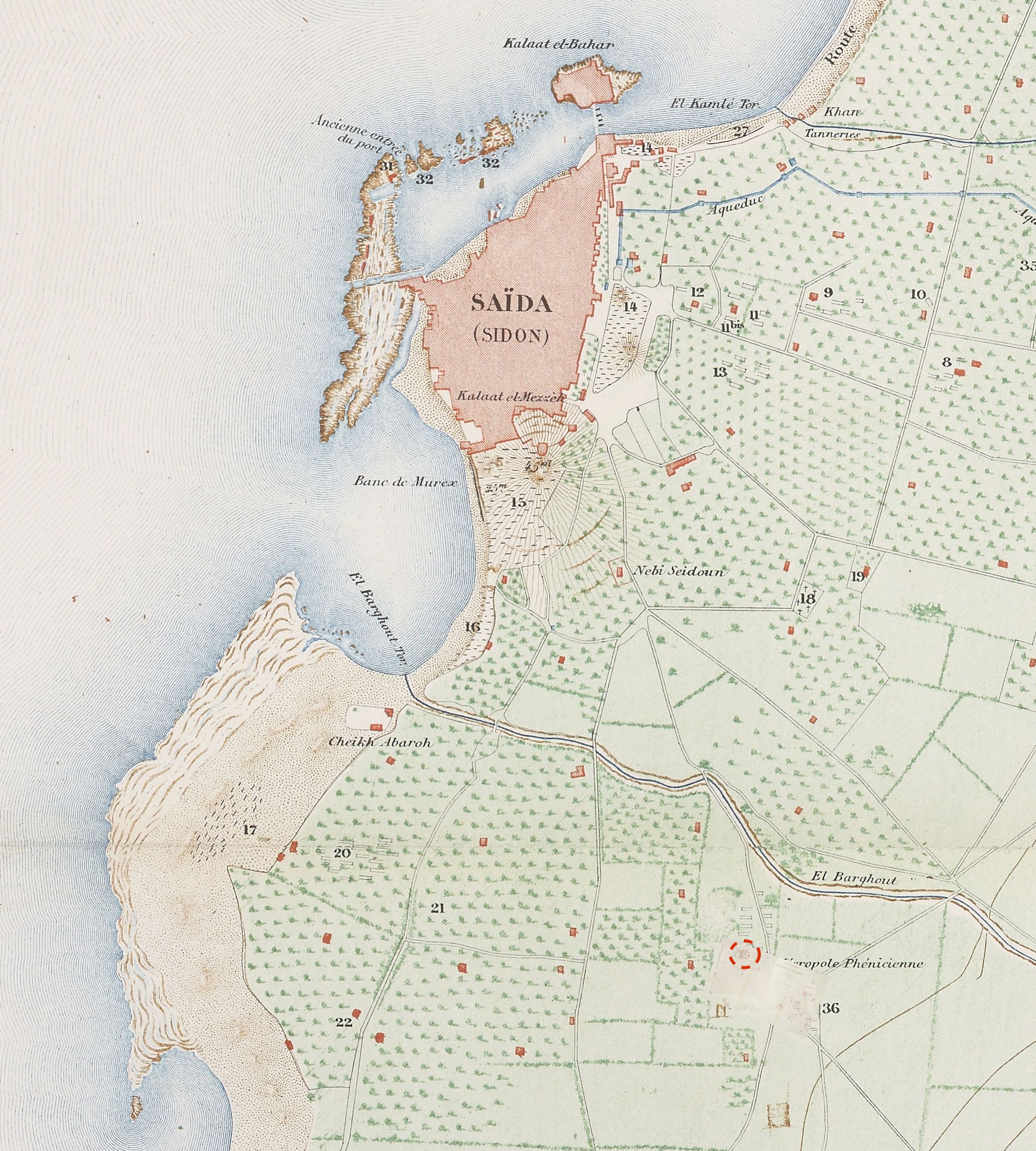
The location where Eshmunazar II's sarcophagus was found is highlighted with a red circle.

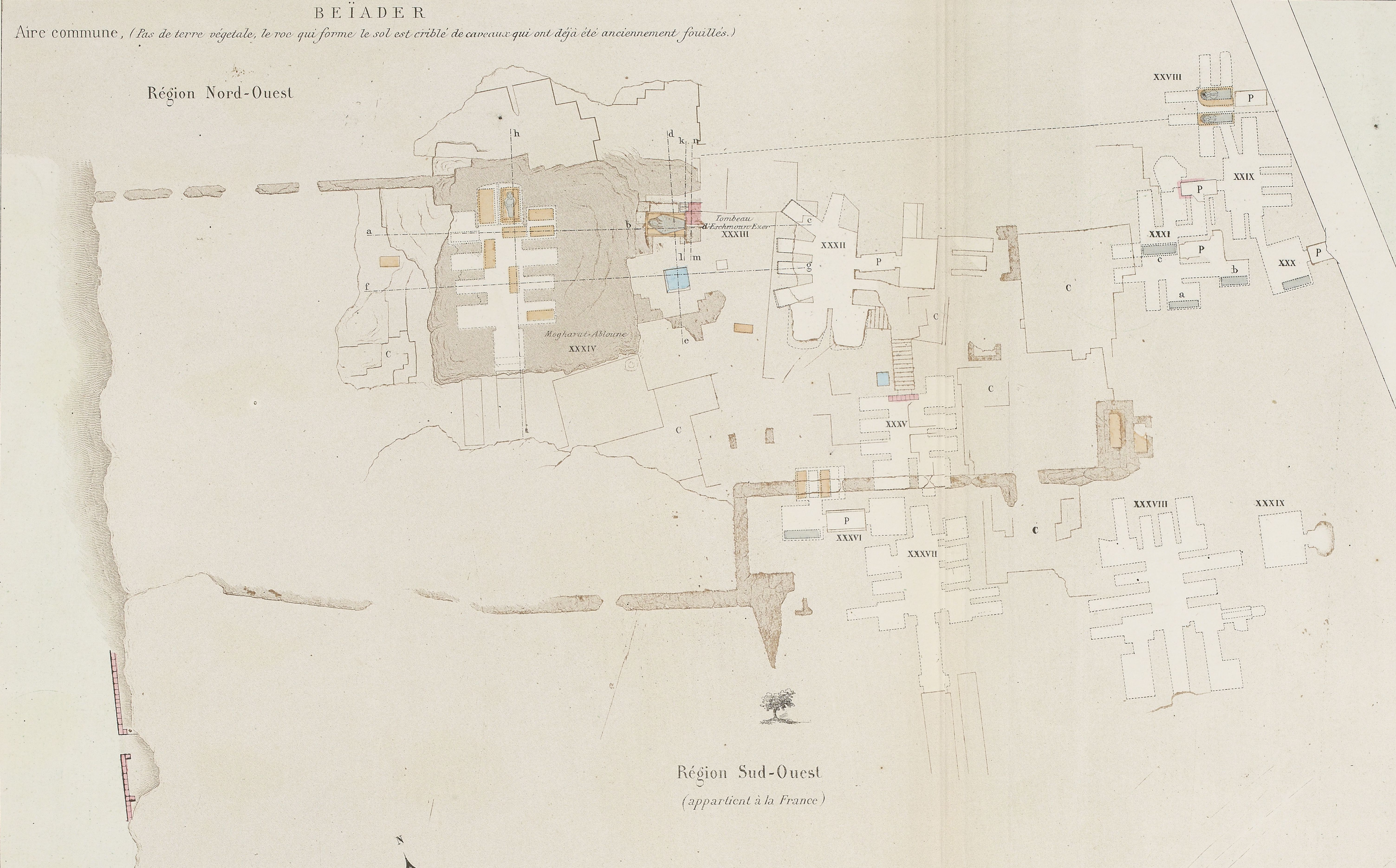
The northwest area of the Nécropole Phénicienne, showing Magharet Abloun and the tomb of Eshmunazar II

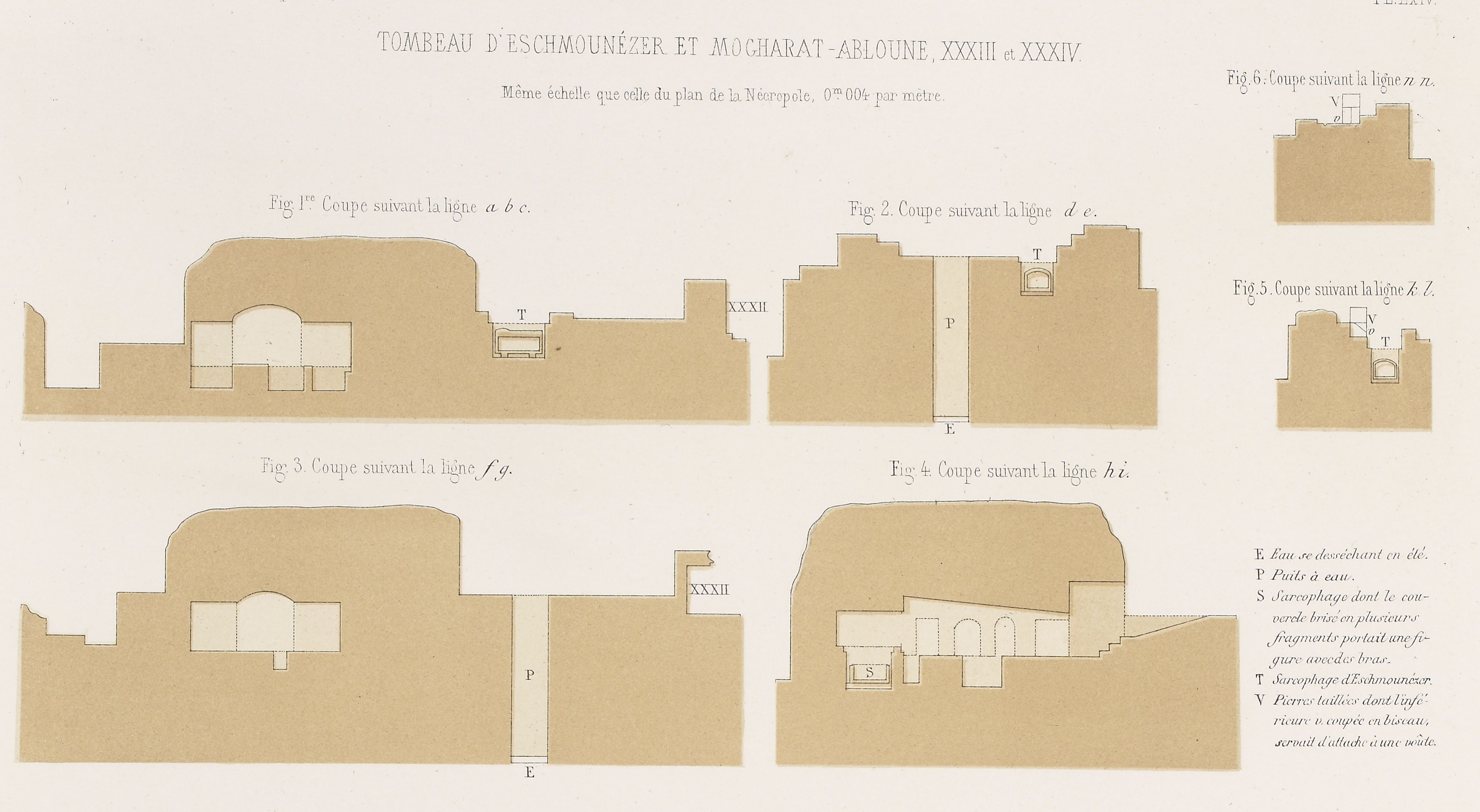
Six cross-sections of Magharet Abloun; the Eshmunazar II sarcophagus is marked 'T'

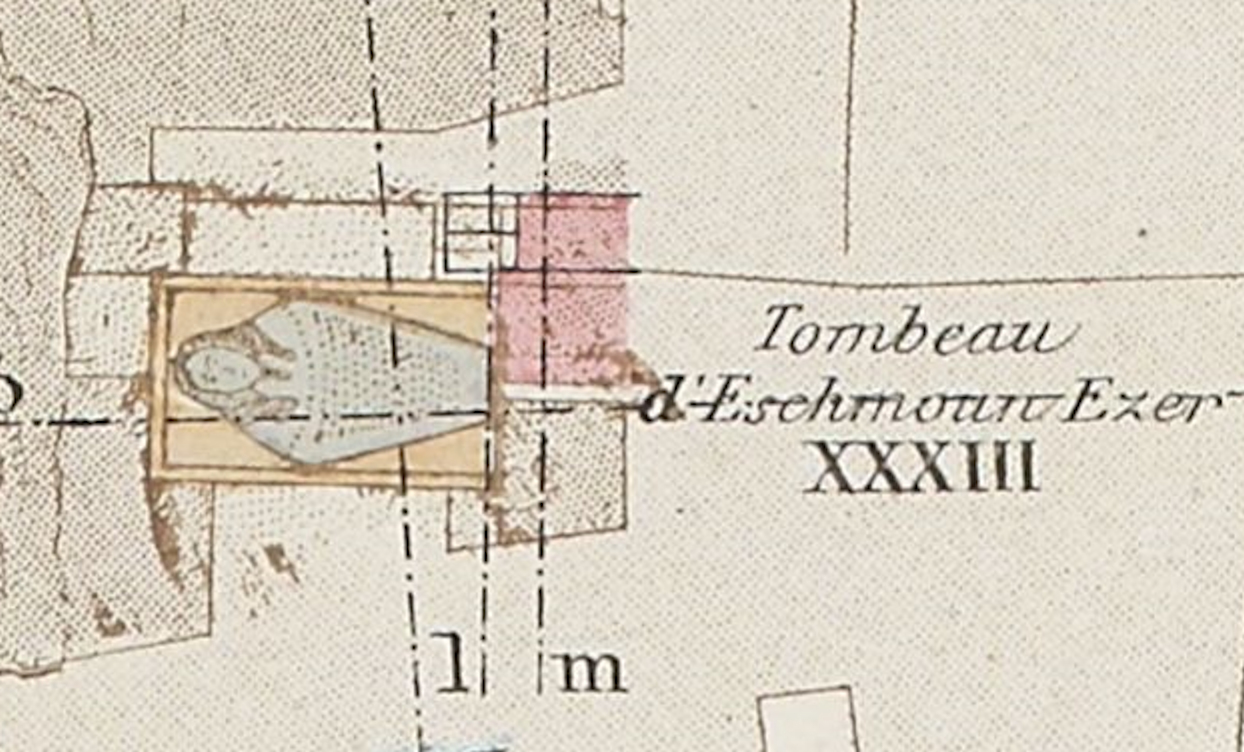
Closeup of Charles Gaillardot's map of the Royal necropolis of Sidon showing Tomb of Eshmunazar II

== Description ==
Sarcophagus of Eshmunazar II

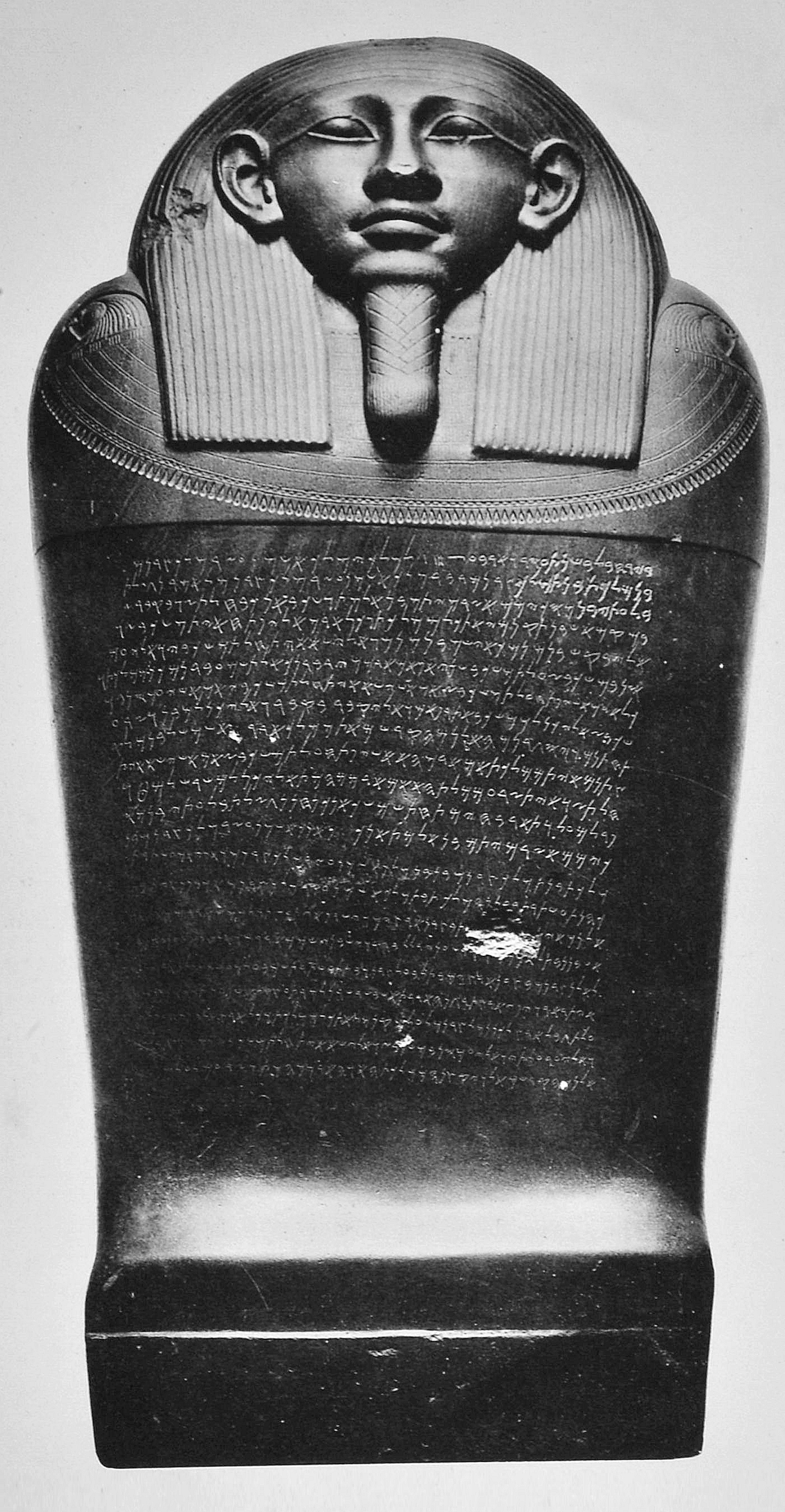
Picture of the sarcophagus lid

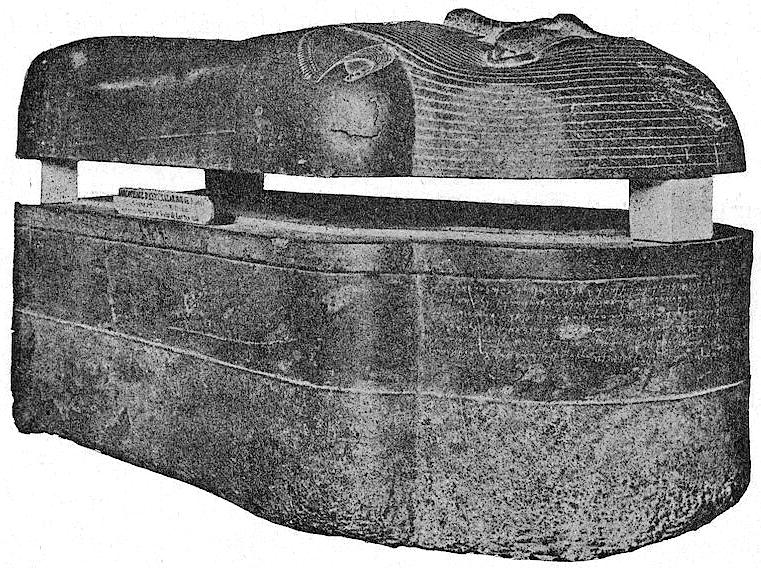
1892 picture of the sarcophagus with the trough inscription visible under the lid

The Egyptian anthropoid-style sarcophagus dates to the 6th century BC and is made of a solid, well polished block of bluish-black amphibolite. It measures 256 cm (8.40 ft) long, 125 cm (4.10 ft) wide, and 119 cm (3.90 ft) high. (Note: Dimensions given in de Luynes report are 2.45 metres (8.0 ft) tall by 1.4 metres (4.6 ft) wide.)

The lid displays a relief carving of the figure of a deceased person in the style of Egyptian mummy sarcophagi. The effigy of the deceased is portrayed smiling, wrapped up to the neck in a thick shroud, leaving the head uncovered. The effigy is dressed with a large Nubian wig, a false braided beard, and a usekh collar ending with falcon heads at each of its extremities, as is often seen at the neck of Egyptian mummies.

Two other sarcophagi of the same style were also unearthed in the necropolis.

=== Inscriptions ===
The Egyptian-style sarcophagus has no hieroglyphs; however, there are Phoenician inscriptions on its lid and trough. De Luynes and American philologist William Wadden Turner believed that the inscriptions were traced directly on the stone free-hand without the use of typographic guides for letter-spacing, and that these tracings were followed by the carving artisan.

The inscriptions of the sarcophagus of Eshmunazar are known to scholars as CIS I 3 and KAI 14; they are written in the Phoenician language and alphabet. They identify the king buried inside, tell of his lineage and temple construction feats, and warn against disturbing his repose. The inscriptions also state that the "Lord of Kings" (the Achaemenid King of Kings) granted the Sidonian king "Dor and Joppa, the mighty lands of Dagon, which are in the plain of Sharon" in recognition of his deeds. According to Scottish biblical scholar John Gibson the text "offers an unusually high proportion of literary parallels with the Hebrew Bible, especially its poetic sections". French orientalist Jean-Joseph-Léandre Bargès wrote that the language is "identical with Hebrew, except for the final inflections of a few words and certain expressions." (Note: Bargès wrote as follows: French: "Sous le rapport de la linguistique, il nous fournit de précieux renseignements sur la nature de la langue parlée en Phénicie quatre siècles environ avant l'ère chrétienne; cette langue s'y montre identique avec l'hébreu, sauf les inflexions finales de quelques mots et certaines expressions, en très-petit nombre, qui ne se retrouvent pas dans les textes bibliques parvenus jusqu'à nous; le fait de l'hébreu écrit et parlé à Sidon, à une époque où les Juifs de retour de la captivité n'entendaient déjà plus cette langue, est une preuve qu'elle s'est conservée chez les Phéniciens plus longtemps que chez les Hébreux eux-mêmes", lit. 'With regard to linguistics, it provides us with valuable information on the nature of the language spoken in Phoenicia about four centuries before the Christian era; this language is shown to be identical with Hebrew, except for the final inflections of a few words and certain expressions, in very small numbers, which are not found in the biblical texts which have come down to us; the fact that Hebrew was written and spoken in Sidon, at a time when the Jews returning from captivity no longer heard this language, is proof that it was preserved among the Phoenicians longer than among the Hebrews themselves.')

As in other Phoenician inscriptions, the text seems to use no, or hardly any, matres lectionis, the letters that indicate vowels in Semitic languages. As in Aramaic, the preposition אית (ʾyt) is used as an accusative marker, while את (ʾt) is used for 'with'.

==== Lid inscription ====
The lid inscription consists of 22 lines of 40 to 55 letters each; it occupies a square situated under the sarcophagus' usekh collar and measures 84 cm (2.76 ft) in length and width. As is customary for Phoenician writing, all the characters are written without spaces separating each word, except for a space in the 13th line, which divides the text into two equal parts. The lid letters are not evenly spaced, ranging from no distance to a spacing of 6.35 mm (0.250 in). The lines of the text are neither straight nor evenly spaced. The letters in the lower part of the text (after the lacuna on line 13) are neater and smaller than the letters in the first part of the inscription. The letters of the first three lines of the lid inscription are cut deeper and rougher than the rest of the text which indicates that the engraver was either replaced or made to work more neatly.

==== Trough inscriptions ====
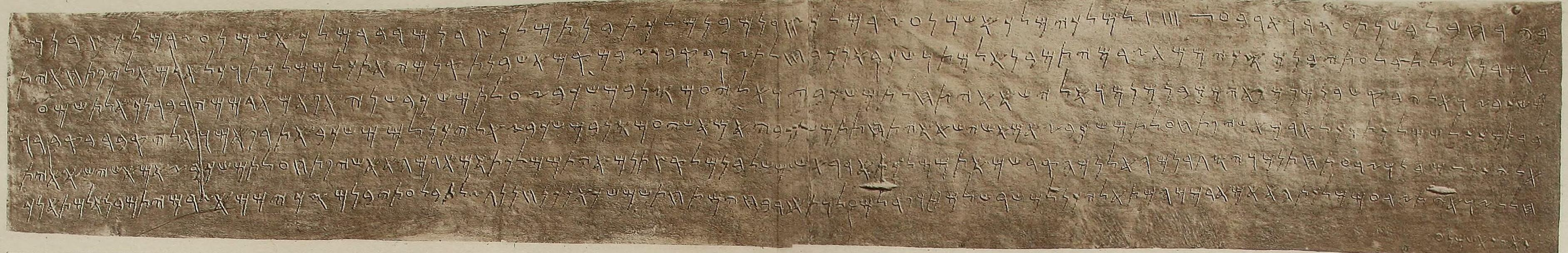
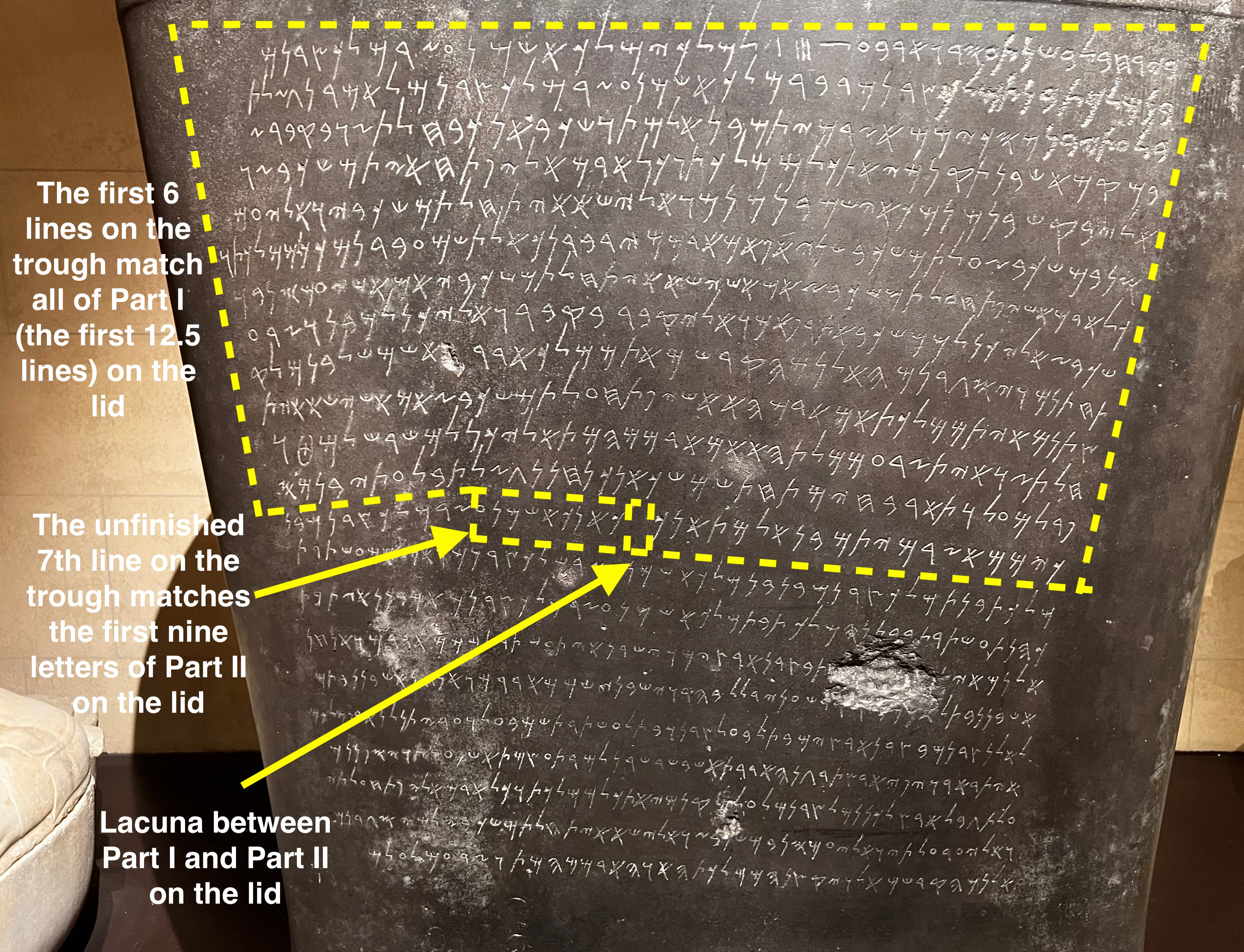
Comparison of the trough inscription (squeeze copy, top) and lid inscription (annotated photo, bottom)

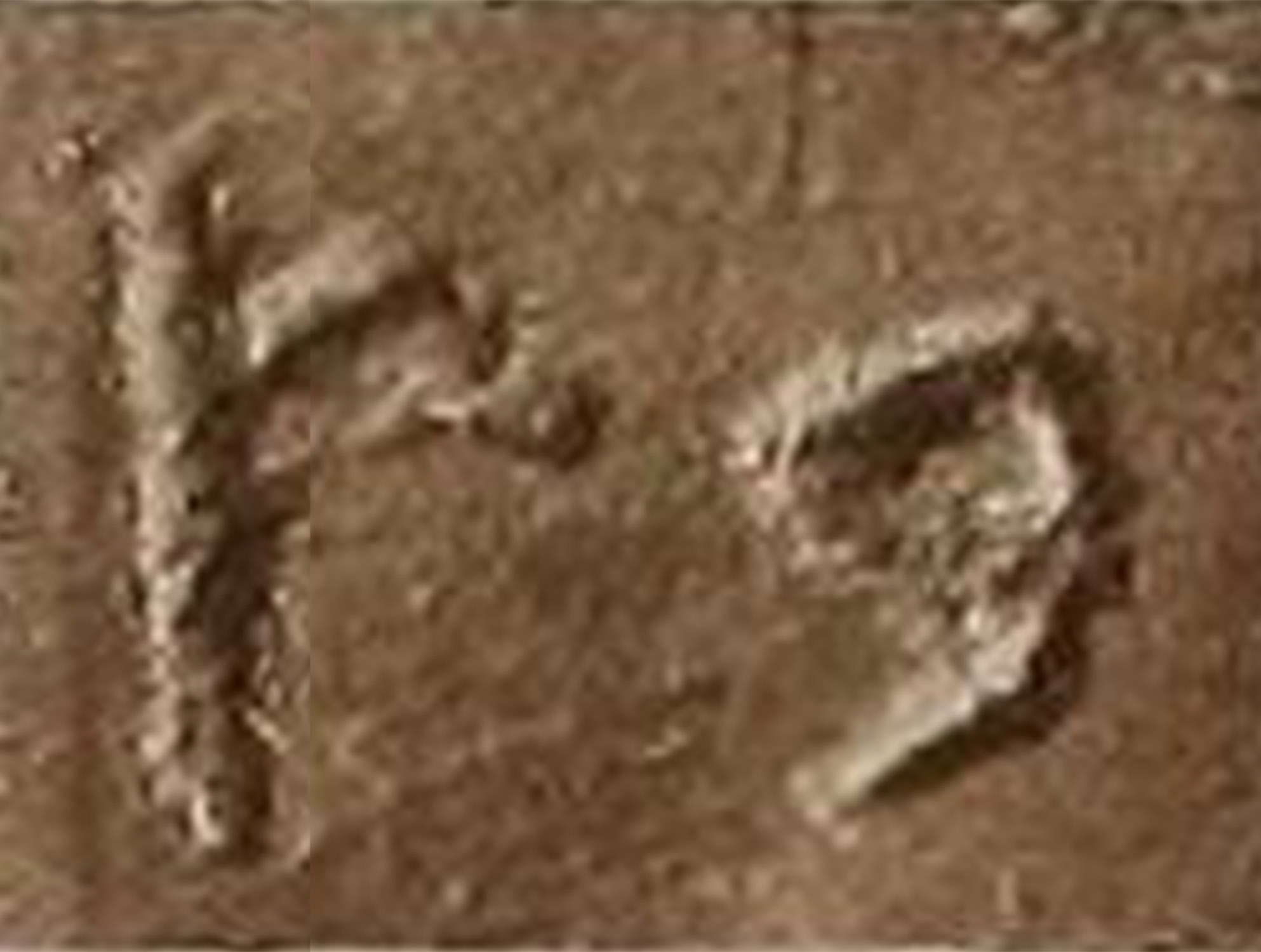
The two characters of the sarcophagus trough

A copy of the first part (twelve and a half lines) of the lid inscription is carved delicately and uniformly on six lines around the head curvature on the trough of the sarcophagus, with the letters corresponding in size and style to the second part of the lid inscription. An unfinished seventh line matches the first nine characters that form the beginning of the text that begins after the lacuna on the 13th line of the lid inscription. It measures 140 cm (4.6 ft) in width, significantly wider than the lid inscription.

The relationship between the trough and the lid inscription has been discussed amongst scholars. Turner believed that the similarity of the trough's characters to those of Part II of the lid inscription suggested that the trough was inscribed immediately after the completion of the lid. Turner speculated that this may have been to claim both parts of the sarcophagus as Eshmunazar's property, and suggested that the original intention was to copy the whole of the lid inscription, but after the copy of Part II had started, it was concluded that the ornamental line which runs round the outside of the sarcophagus would have divided the inscription in an unattractive manner. Turner's theory was in contrast to German theologian Heinrich Ewald's earlier proposal that originally the entire inscription had been intended to be engraved around the trough, to represent it as proceeding from his mouth, but error(s) made in the writing caused it to be abandoned, and the inscription started again on the lid.

The external surface of the trough bears also an isolated group of two Phoenician characters. De Luynes believes that they may have been trial carving marks made by the engraver.

==== Translations ====
Copies of the sarcophagus inscriptions were sent to scholars across the world, and translations were published by well-known scholars (see below table). Several other scholars worked on the translation, including the polymath Josiah Willard Gibbs, Hebrew language scholar William Henry Green, Biblical scholars James Murdock and Williams Jenks, and Syriac language expert Christian Frederic Crusé. American missionaries William McClure Thomson and Eli Smith who were living in Ottoman Syria at the time of the discovery of the sarcophagus successfully translated most of the text by early 1855, but did not produce any publications.

Belgian semitist Jean-Claude Haelewyck provided a hypothetical vocalization of the Phoenician text. A definitive vocalization is not possible because Phoenician is written without matres lectionis. Haelewyck based the premise of his vocalization on the affinity of the Phoenician and Hebrew languages, historical grammar, and ancient transcriptions.

A list of early published translations follows below:

Author	Memoir	Previous interpretations consulted	Published work
Edward E. Salisbury	1855		Phoenician Inscription of Sidon
William Wadden Turner	3 July 1855		The Sidon Inscription
Emil Rödiger	15 June 1855		Bemerkungen über die phönikische Inschrift eines am 19. Januar 1855 nahe bei Sidon gefundenen Königs-Sarkophag's
Franz Dietrich and Johann Gildemeister	1 July 1855		Zwei Sidonische Inschriften, eine griechische aus christlicher Zeit und eine altphönicische Königsinschrift
Ferdinand Hitzig	30 September 1855	Rödiger, Dietrich.	Die Grabschrift des Eschmunazar
Konstantin Schlottmann	December 1855	Rödiger, Dietrich, Hitzig, De Luynes and Ewald.	Die Inschrift Eschmunazar's, Königs der Sidonier
Honoré Théodoric d'Albert de Luynes	15 December 1855		Mémoire sur le Sarcophage et inscription funéraire d'Esmunazar, roi de Sidon
Heinrich Ewald	19 January 1856	Salisbury, Turner, Roidiger, Dietrich, Hitzig.	Erklärung der grossen phönikischen inschrift von Sidon und einer ägyptisch-aramäischen : mit den zuverlässigen abbildern beider
Jean-Joseph-Léandre Bargès	1856	Salisbury, Turner, Rödiger, Dietrich, Hitzig, De Luynes, Ewald (?).	Mémoire sur le sarcophage et l'inscription funéraire d'Eschmounazar, roi de Sidon
Salomon Munk	6 April 1856	Salisbury, Turner, Rödiger, Dietrich, Hitzig, DeLuynes, Bargès.	Essais sur l'inscription phénicienne du sarcophage d'Eschmoun-'Ezer, roi de Sidon
Moritz Abraham Levy	August 1856	Salisbury, Turner, Rödiger, Dietrich, Hitzig, Ewald, De Luynes, Munk	Phönizisches Wörterbuch

==== English translation of the lid inscription ====
Line number	Original Phoenician inscription	Transliteration	Transcription	English translation
1	𐤁𐤉𐤓𐤇 𐤁𐤋 𐤁𐤔𐤍𐤕 𐤏𐤎𐤓 𐤅𐤀𐤓𐤁𐤏 𐤗𐤖𐤖𐤖𐤖 𐤋𐤌𐤋𐤊𐤉 𐤌𐤋𐤊 𐤀𐤔𐤌𐤍𐤏𐤆𐤓 𐤌𐤋𐤊 𐤑𐤃𐤍𐤌	byrḥ bl bšnt ʿsr wʾrbʿ 14 lmlky mlk ʾšmnʿzr mlk ṣdnm	biyarḥ būl bišanōt ʿasr we-ʾarbaʿ lemulkiyū milk ʾèšmūnʿazar milk ṣīdōnīm	In the month of Bul, in the fourteenth year of the reign of king Eshmunazar, king of the Sidonians
2	𐤁𐤍 𐤌𐤋𐤊 𐤕𐤁𐤍𐤕 𐤌𐤋𐤊 𐤑𐤃𐤍𐤌 𐤃𐤁𐤓 𐤌𐤋𐤊 𐤀𐤔𐤌𐤍𐤏𐤆𐤓 𐤌𐤋𐤊 𐤑𐤃𐤍𐤌 𐤋𐤀𐤌𐤓 𐤍𐤂𐤆𐤋𐤕	bn mlk tbnt mlk ṣdnm dbr mlk ʾšmnʿzr mlk ṣdnm lʾmr ngzlt	bin milk tabnīt milk ṣīdōnīm dabar milk ʾèšmūnʿazar milk ṣīdōnīm līʾmōr nagzaltī	son of king Tabnit, king of the Sidonians, king Eshmunazar, king of the Sidonians, said as follows: I was carried away
3	𐤁𐤋 𐤏𐤕𐤉 𐤁𐤍 𐤌𐤎𐤊 𐤉𐤌𐤌 𐤀𐤆𐤓𐤌 𐤉𐤕𐤌 𐤁𐤍 𐤀𐤋𐤌𐤕 𐤅𐤔𐤊𐤁 𐤀𐤍𐤊 𐤁𐤇𐤋𐤕 𐤆 𐤅𐤁𐤒𐤁𐤓 𐤆	bl ʿty bn msk ymm ʾzrm ytm bn ʾlmt wškb ʾnk bḥlt z wbqbr z	bal ʿittiya bin masok yōmīm ʾazzīrīm yatum bin ʾalmatt wešōkéb ʾanōkī biḥallot zō webiqabr zè	before my time, son of a limited number of short days (or: son of a limited number of days I was cut off), an orphan, the son of a widow, and I am lying in this coffin and in this tomb,
4	𐤁𐤌𐤒𐤌 𐤀𐤔 𐤁𐤍𐤕 𐤒𐤍𐤌𐤉 𐤀𐤕 𐤊𐤋 𐤌𐤌𐤋𐤊𐤕 𐤅𐤊𐤋 𐤀𐤃𐤌 𐤀𐤋 𐤉𐤐𐤕𐤇 𐤀𐤉𐤕 𐤌𐤔𐤊𐤁 𐤆 𐤅	bmqm ʾš bnt qnmy ʾt kl mmlkt wkl ʾdm ʾl yptḥ ʾyt mškb z w	bammaqōm ʾéš banītī qenummiya ʾatta kull mamlokūt wekull ʾadōm ʾal yiptaḥ ʾiyat miškob zè we-	in a place which I have built. Whoever you are, king or (ordinary) man, may he [sic] not open this resting-place and
5	𐤀𐤋 𐤉𐤁𐤒𐤔 𐤁𐤍 𐤌𐤍𐤌 𐤊 𐤀𐤉 𐤔𐤌 𐤁𐤍 𐤌𐤍𐤌 𐤅𐤀𐤋 𐤉𐤔𐤀 𐤀𐤉𐤕 𐤇𐤋𐤕 𐤌𐤔𐤊𐤁𐤉 𐤅𐤀𐤋 𐤉𐤏𐤌	ʾl ybqš bn mnm k ʾy šm bn mnm wʾl yšʾ ʾyt ḥlt mškby wʾl yʿm	-ʾal yebaqqéš bin(n)ū mīnumma kī ʾayy śōmū bin(n)ū mīnumma weʾal yiššōʾ ʾiyyōt ḥallot miškobiya weʾal yaʿm-	may he not search in it after anything because nothing whatsoever has been placed into it. And may he not move the coffin of my resting-place, nor carry me
6	𐤎𐤍 𐤁𐤌𐤔𐤊𐤁 𐤆 𐤏𐤋𐤕 𐤌𐤔𐤊𐤁 𐤔𐤍𐤉 𐤀𐤐 𐤀𐤌 𐤀𐤃𐤌𐤌 𐤉𐤃𐤁𐤓𐤍𐤊 𐤀𐤋 𐤕𐤔𐤌𐤏 𐤁𐤃𐤍𐤌 𐤊 𐤊𐤋 𐤌𐤌𐤋𐤊𐤕 𐤅	sn bmškb z ʿlt mškb šny ʾp ʾm ʾdmm ydbrnk ʾl tšmʿ bdnm k kl mmlkt w	-sénī bimiškob zè ʿalōt miškob šénīy ʾap ʾimʾiyyōt ʾadōmīm yedabberūnakā ʾal tišmaʿ baddanōm kakull mamlokūt we-	away from this resting-place to another resting-place. Also if men talk to you do not listen to their chatter. For every king and
7	𐤊𐤋 𐤀𐤃𐤌 𐤀𐤔 𐤉𐤐𐤕𐤇 𐤏𐤋𐤕 𐤌𐤔𐤊𐤁 𐤆 𐤀𐤌 𐤀𐤔 𐤉𐤔𐤀 𐤀𐤉𐤕 𐤇𐤋𐤕 𐤌𐤔𐤊𐤁𐤉 𐤀𐤌 𐤀𐤔 𐤉𐤏𐤌𐤎𐤍 𐤁𐤌	kl ʾdm ʾš yptḥ ʿlt mškb z ʾm ʾš yšʾ ʾyt ḥlt mškby ʾm ʾš yʿmsn bm	-kull ʾadōm ʾéš yiptaḥ ʿalōt miškob zè ʾīm ʾéš yiššōʾ ʾiyyōt ḥallot miškobiya ʾīm ʾéš yaʿmusénī bimi-	every (ordinary) man, who will open what is above this resting-place, or will lift up the coffin of my resting-place, or will carry me away from
8	𐤔𐤊𐤁 𐤆 𐤀𐤋 𐤉𐤊𐤍 𐤋𐤌 𐤌𐤔𐤊𐤁 𐤀𐤕 𐤓𐤐𐤀𐤌 𐤅𐤀𐤋 𐤉𐤒𐤁𐤓 𐤁𐤒𐤁𐤓 𐤅𐤀𐤋 𐤉𐤊𐤍 𐤋𐤌 𐤁𐤍 𐤅𐤆𐤓𐤏	škb z ʾl ykn lm mškb ʾt rpʾm wʾl yqbr bqbr wʾl ykn lm bn wzrʿ	-škob zè ʾal yakūn lōm miškob ʾōt rapaʾīm weʾal yiqqabirū nagzaltī biqabr weʾal yakūnū lōm bin wezarʿ	this resting-place, may they not have a resting-place with the Rephaïm, may they not be buried in a tomb, and may they not have a son or offspring
9	𐤕𐤇𐤕𐤍𐤌 𐤅𐤉𐤎𐤂𐤓𐤍𐤌 𐤄𐤀𐤋𐤍𐤌 𐤄𐤒𐤃𐤔𐤌 𐤀𐤕 𐤌𐤌𐤋𐤊(𐤕) 𐤀𐤃𐤓 𐤀𐤔 𐤌𐤔𐤋 𐤁𐤍𐤌 𐤋𐤒	tḥtnm wysgrnm hʾlnm hqdšm ʾt mmlk(t) ʾdr ʾš mšl bnm lq	taḥténōm weyasgirūnōm hāʾalōnīm haqqadošīm ʾét mamlokū[t] ʾaddīr ʾéš mōšél bin(n)ōm laq-	after them. And may the sacred gods deliver them to a mighty king who will rule them in order
10	𐤑𐤕𐤍𐤌 𐤀𐤉𐤕 𐤌𐤌𐤋𐤊𐤕 𐤀𐤌 𐤀𐤃𐤌 𐤄𐤀 𐤀𐤔 𐤉𐤐𐤕𐤇 𐤏𐤋𐤕 𐤌𐤔𐤊𐤁 𐤆 𐤀𐤌 𐤀𐤔 𐤉𐤔𐤀 𐤀𐤉𐤕	ṣtnm ʾyt mmlkt ʾm ʾdm hʾ ʾš yptḥ ʿlt mškb z ʾm ʾš yšʾ ʾyt	-ṣṣotinōm/laqaṣṣōtinōm ʾiyyōt mamlokūt ʾim ʾadōm hūʾa ʾéš yiptaḥ ʿalōt miškob zè ʾīm ʾéš yiššōʾ ʾiyyōt	to exterminate them, the king or this (ordinary) man who will open what is over this resting-place or will lift up
11	𐤇𐤋𐤕 𐤆 𐤅𐤀𐤉𐤕 𐤆𐤓𐤏 𐤌𐤌𐤋𐤕 𐤄𐤀 𐤀𐤌 𐤀𐤃𐤌𐤌 𐤄𐤌𐤕 𐤀𐤋 𐤉𐤊𐤍 𐤋𐤌 𐤔𐤓𐤔 𐤋𐤌𐤈 𐤅	ḥlt z wʾyt zrʿ mmlt hʾ ʾm ʾdmm hmt ʾl ykn lm šrš lmṭ w	ḥallot zè weʾiyat zarʿ mamlo[kū]t hūʾa ʾim ʾadōmīm humatu ʾal yakūnū lōm šurš lamaṭṭō we-	this coffin, and (also) the offspring of this king or of those (ordinary) men. They shall not have root below or
12	𐤐𐤓 𐤋𐤌𐤏𐤋 𐤅𐤕𐤀𐤓 𐤁𐤇𐤉𐤌 𐤕𐤇𐤕 𐤔𐤌𐤔 𐤊 𐤀𐤍𐤊 𐤍𐤇𐤍 𐤍𐤂𐤆𐤋𐤕 𐤁𐤋 𐤏𐤕𐤉 𐤁𐤍 𐤌𐤎	pr lmʿl wtʾr bḥym tḥt šmš k ʾnk nḥn ngzlt bl ʿty bn ms	-parī lamaʿlō wetuʾr baḥayyīm taḥt šamš ka ʾanōkī nāḥān nagzaltī bal ʿittiya bin maso-	fruit above or appearance in the life under the sun. For I who deserve mercy, I was carried away before my time, son of a limited
13	𐤊 𐤉𐤌𐤌 𐤀𐤆𐤓𐤌 𐤉𐤕𐤌 𐤁𐤍 𐤀𐤋𐤌𐤕 𐤀𐤍𐤊 𐤊 𐤀𐤍𐤊 𐤀𐤔𐤌𐤍𐤏𐤆𐤓 𐤌𐤋𐤊 𐤑𐤃𐤍𐤌 𐤁𐤍	k ymm ʾzrm ytm bn ʾlmt ʾnk k ʾnk ʾšmnʿzr mlk ṣdnm bn	-k yōmīm ʾazzīrīm yatum bin ʾalmatt ʾanōkī ka ʾanōkī ʾèšmūnʿazar milk ṣīdōnīm bin	number of short days (or: son of a limited number of days I was cut off), I an orphan, the son of a widow. For I, Eshmunazar, king of the Sidonians, son of
14	𐤌𐤋𐤊 𐤕𐤁𐤍𐤕 𐤌𐤋𐤊 𐤑𐤃𐤍𐤌 𐤁𐤍 𐤁𐤍 𐤌𐤋𐤊 𐤀𐤔𐤌𐤍𐤏𐤆𐤓 𐤌𐤋𐤊 𐤑𐤃𐤍𐤌 𐤅𐤀𐤌𐤉 𐤀𐤌𐤏𐤔𐤕𐤓𐤕	mlk tbnt mlk ṣdnm bn bn mlk ʾšmnʿzr mlk ṣdnm wʾmy ʾm ʿštrt	milk tabnīt milk ṣīdōnīm bin bin milk ʾèšmūnʿazar milk ṣīdōnīm weʾummī ʾamotʿaštart	king Tabnit, king of the Sidonians, grandson of king Eshmunazar, king of the Sidonians, and my mother Amo[t]astart,
15	𐤊𐤄𐤍𐤕 𐤏𐤔𐤕𐤓𐤕 𐤓𐤁𐤕𐤍 𐤄𐤌𐤋𐤊𐤕 𐤁𐤕 𐤌𐤋𐤊 𐤀𐤔𐤌𐤍𐤏𐤆𐤓 𐤌𐤋𐤊 𐤑𐤃𐤍𐤌 𐤀𐤌 𐤁𐤍𐤍 𐤀𐤉𐤕 𐤁𐤕	khnt ʿštrt rbtn hmlkt bt mlk ʾšmnʿzr mlk ṣdnm ʾm bnn ʾyt bt	kōhant ʿaštart rabbotanū hammilkōt bat milk ʾèšmūnʿazar milk ṣīdōnīm ʾ[š] banīnū ʾiyyōt bīté	priestess of Ashtart, our lady, the queen, daughter of king Eshmunazar, king of the Sidonians, (it is we) who have built the temples
16	𐤀𐤋𐤍𐤌 𐤀𐤉𐤕 (𐤁𐤕 𐤏𐤔𐤕𐤓)𐤕 𐤁𐤑𐤃𐤍 𐤀𐤓𐤑 𐤉𐤌 𐤅𐤉𐤔𐤓𐤍 𐤀𐤉𐤕 𐤏𐤔𐤕𐤓𐤕 𐤔𐤌𐤌 𐤀𐤃𐤓𐤌 𐤅𐤀𐤍𐤇𐤍	ʾlnm ʾyt [bt ʿštr]t bṣdn ʾrṣ ym wyšrn ʾyt ʿštrt šmm ʾdrm wʾnḥn	ʾalōnīm ʾiyyōt [bīt ʿaštar]t biṣīdōn ʾarṣ yim weyōšibnū ʾiyyōt ʿaštart šamém ʾaddīrim weʾanaḥnū	of the gods, [the temple of Ashtar]t in Sidon, the land of the sea. And we have placed Ashtart (in) the mighty heavens (or: in Shamem-Addirim?). And it is we
17	𐤀𐤔 𐤁𐤍𐤍 𐤁𐤕 𐤋𐤀𐤔𐤌𐤍 (𐤔)𐤓 𐤒𐤃𐤔 𐤏𐤍 𐤉𐤃𐤋𐤋 𐤁𐤄𐤓 𐤅𐤉𐤔𐤁𐤍𐤉 𐤔𐤌𐤌 𐤀𐤃𐤓𐤌 𐤅𐤀𐤍𐤇𐤍 𐤀𐤔 𐤁𐤍𐤍 𐤁𐤕𐤌	ʾš bnn bt lʾšmn [š]r qdš ʿn ydll bhr wyšbny šmm ʾdrm wʾnḥn ʾš bnn btm	éš banīnū bīt laʾèšmūn [śa]r qudš ʿīn ydll bihar weyōšibnūyū šamém ʾaddīrim weʾanaḥnū ʾéš banīnū bītīm	who have built a temple for Eshmun, the prince of the sanctuary of the source of YDLL in the mountains, and we have placed him (in) the mighty heavens (or: in Shamem-Addirim?). And it is we who have built temples
18	𐤋𐤀𐤋𐤍 𐤑𐤃𐤍𐤌 𐤁𐤑𐤃𐤍 𐤀𐤓𐤑 𐤉𐤌 𐤁𐤕 𐤋𐤁𐤏𐤋 𐤑𐤃𐤍 𐤅𐤁𐤕 𐤋𐤏𐤔𐤕𐤓𐤕 𐤔𐤌 𐤁𐤏𐤋 𐤅𐤏𐤃 𐤉𐤕𐤍 𐤋𐤍 𐤀𐤃𐤍 𐤌𐤋𐤊𐤌	lʾln ṣdnm bṣdn ʾrṣ ym bt lbʿl ṣdn wbt lʿštrt šm bʿl wʿd ytn ln ʾdn mlkm	aʾalōné ṣīdōnīm biṣīdōn ʾarṣyim bīt labaʿl ṣīdōn webīt laʿaštart šim baʿl weʿōd yatan lanū ʾadōn milakīm	for the gods of the Sidonians in Sidon, the land of the sea, a temple for Baal of Sidon, and a temple for Ashtart, the Name of Baal. Moreover, the lord of kings gave us
19	𐤀𐤉𐤕 𐤃𐤀𐤓 𐤅𐤉𐤐𐤉 𐤀𐤓𐤑𐤕 𐤃𐤂𐤍 𐤄𐤀𐤃𐤓𐤕 𐤀𐤔 𐤁𐤔𐤃 𐤔𐤓𐤍 𐤋𐤌𐤃𐤕 𐤏𐤑𐤌𐤕 𐤀𐤔 𐤐𐤏𐤋𐤕 𐤅𐤉𐤎𐤐𐤍𐤍𐤌	ʾyt dʾr wypy ʾrṣt dgn hʾdrt ʾš bšd šrn lmdt ʿṣmt ʾš pʿlt wyspnnm	iyat duʾr weyapay ʾarṣōt dagōn hāʾaddīrōt ʾéš biśadé šarōn lamiddot ʿaṣūmot ʾéš paʿaltī weyasapnūném	Dor and Joppa, the mighty lands of Dagon, which are in the Plain of Sharon, as a reward for the brilliant action I did. And we have annexed them
20	𐤏𐤋𐤕 𐤂𐤁𐤋 𐤀𐤓𐤑 𐤋𐤊𐤍𐤍𐤌 𐤋𐤑𐤃𐤍𐤌 𐤋𐤏𐤋(𐤌) 𐤒𐤍𐤌𐤉 𐤀𐤕 𐤊𐤋 𐤌𐤌𐤋𐤊𐤕 𐤅𐤊𐤋 𐤀𐤃𐤌 𐤀𐤋 𐤉𐤐𐤕𐤇 𐤏𐤋𐤕𐤉	ʿlt gbl ʾrṣ lknnm lṣdnm lʿl[m] qnmy ʾt kl mmlkt wkl ʾdm ʾl yptḥ ʿlty	alōt gubūl(é) ʾarṣlakūniném laṣṣīdōnīm laʿōlo[m] qenummiya ʾatta kull mamlokūt wekull ʾadōm ʾal yiptaḥ ʿalōtiya	to the boundary of the land, so that they would belong to the Sidonians for ever. Whoever you are, king or (ordinary) man, do not open what is above me
21	𐤅𐤀𐤋 𐤉𐤏𐤓 𐤏𐤋𐤕𐤉 𐤅𐤀𐤋 𐤉𐤏𐤌𐤎𐤍 𐤁𐤌𐤔𐤊𐤁 𐤆 𐤅𐤀𐤋 𐤉𐤔𐤀 𐤀𐤉𐤕 𐤇𐤋𐤕 𐤌𐤔𐤊𐤁𐤉 𐤋𐤌 𐤉𐤎𐤂𐤓𐤍𐤌	wʾl yʿr ʿlty wʾl yʿmsn bmškb z wʾl yšʾ ʾyt ḥlt mškby lm ysgrnm	weʾal yaʿar ʿalōtiya weʾal yaʿmusénī bimiškob zè weʾal yiššōʾ ʾiyyōt ḥallot miškobiya lamā yasgirūnōm	and do not uncover what is above me and do not carry me away from this resting-place and do not lift up the coffin of my resting-place. Otherwise,
22	𐤀𐤋𐤍𐤌 𐤄𐤒𐤃𐤔𐤌 𐤀𐤋 𐤅𐤉𐤒𐤑𐤍 𐤄𐤌𐤌𐤋𐤊𐤕 𐤄𐤀 𐤅𐤄𐤀𐤃𐤌𐤌 𐤄𐤌𐤕 𐤅𐤆𐤓𐤏𐤌 𐤋𐤏𐤋𐤌	ʾlnm hqdšm ʾl wyqṣn hmmlkt hʾ whʾdmm hmt wzrʿm lʿlm	alōnīm haqqadošīm ʾillè weyeqaṣṣūna hammamlokūt hūʾa wehāʾadōmīm humatu wezarʿōm laʿōlom	the sacred gods will deliver them and cut off this king and those (ordinary) men and their offspring for ever.

== Dating and attribution ==
The sarcophagus, along with two others found at the nearby Royal Necropolis of Ayaʿa, are considered the only Egyptian sarcophagi that have ever been found outside of Egypt. (Note: According to Thomas Kelly, Professor Emeritus of History at the University of Minnesota: "Of prime importance [for the dating of 'Es-mun'azor II] is the sarcophagus in which Esmun'azor was buried; it is clearly of Egyptian manufacture and must have been transported to Sidon from Egypt. Moreover, 'Esmun'azor's father Tabnit and a woman frequently assumed to be his wife Am'astart, mother of 'Esmun'azor Il, were also buried in Egyptian sarcophagi that must have been brought to Sidon. (The woman's identity, however, is not certain.) All three sarcophagi have been assigned to the 26th dynasty, which came to an end with the Persian conquest of Egypt. While the sarcophagus of Tabnit was the only one that was completely worked in Egypt before being transported to Sidon, all three are stylistically similar and Buhl has suggested that they were products of the same workshop. It is universally assumed that they must have come to Sidon as booty from a military campaign in Egypt. That assumption seems reasonable enough, for they are, so far as I am aware, the only Egyptian sarcophagi that have ever been found outside Egypt proper. Moreover, these Egyptian sarcophagi seem to have been models for the manufacture of anthropoid sarcophagi at Sidon. Numerous examples, worked in marble and dating mostly from the latter half of the fifth and early half of the fourth centuries B.C., have been found in the city. Though inspired by Egyptian models, these locally manufactured sarcophagi are also under heavy Greek influence. This is important, for their stylistic similarity to products of Greek sculpture allows them to be dated within reasonable limits, though not with absolute certainty. Kukahn dates the earliest of these Sidon sarcophagi to the second quarter of the fifth century B.C.; Kleemann would date them about 475 B.C., while Buhl assigns them to the decade 470-460 B.C. The three Egyptian sarcophagi of Esmun'azor II, Tabnit, and the unidentified woman must, accordingly, have been brought to Sidon earlier.") Marie-Louise Buhl's monograph The late Egyptian anthropoid stone sarcophagi confirmed the sarcophagus as belonging to the 26th dynasty, which began in 664 BC and ended with Cambyses II's conquest of Egypt in 525 BC – many centuries after the last of the known Egyptian Stelae in the Levant. These three Egyptian sarcophagi are considered to have contained the bodies of the same family – i.e. Eshmunazar II and his parents Tabnit and Amoashtart. Whereas Tabnit's sarcophagus reemployed a sarcophagus already dedicated on its front with a long Egyptian inscription in the name of an Egyptian general, and Amoashtart's was uninscribed, the sarcophagus used for Eshmunazar II was new and was inscribed with a full-length dedication in Phoenician on a clean surface. According to French archaeologist and epigrapher René Dussaud, the sarcophagi and their inscriptions may have been ordered by Amoashtart.

Scholars believe these sarcophagi were originally made in Egypt for members of the Ancient Egyptian elite, but were then transported to Sidon and repurposed for the burial of Sidonian royalty. Gibson and later scholars believe that the sarcophagi were captured as booty by the Sidonians during their participation in Cambyses II's conquest. Herodotus recounts an event in which Cambyses II "ransacked a burial ground at Memphis, where coffins were opened up and the dead bodies they contained were examined", possibly providing the occasion on which the sarcophagi were removed and reappropriated by his Sidonian subjects.

== Significance ==
The discovery of the Magharet Abloun hypogeum and of Eshmunazar II's sarcophagus caused a sensation in France, which led Napoleon III, Emperor of the French, to dispatch a scientific mission to Lebanon headed by Ernest Renan.

=== Significance of the inscription ===
Origins and style influence

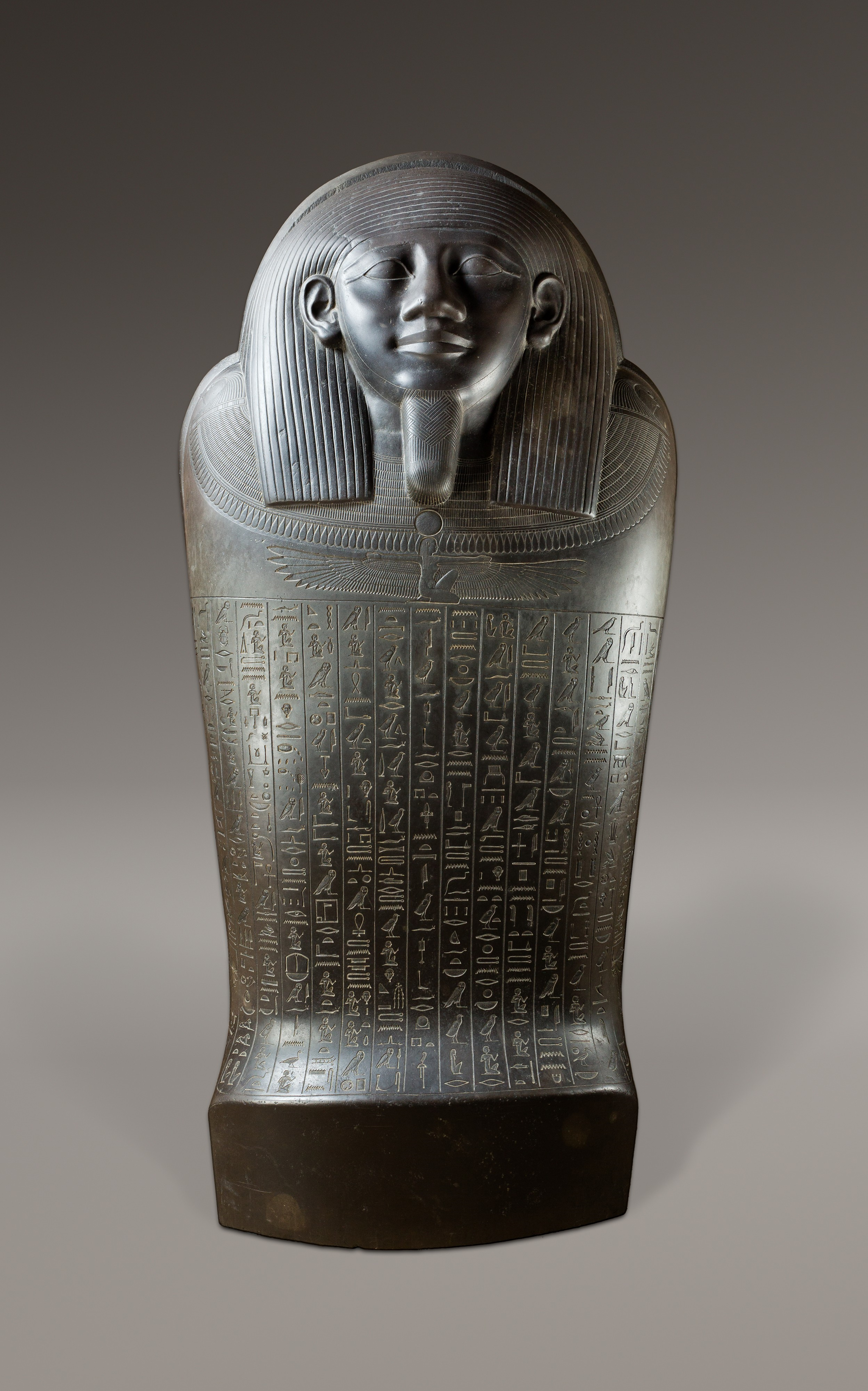
Sarcophagus of Harkhebit, also of the 26th dynasty, Saqqara

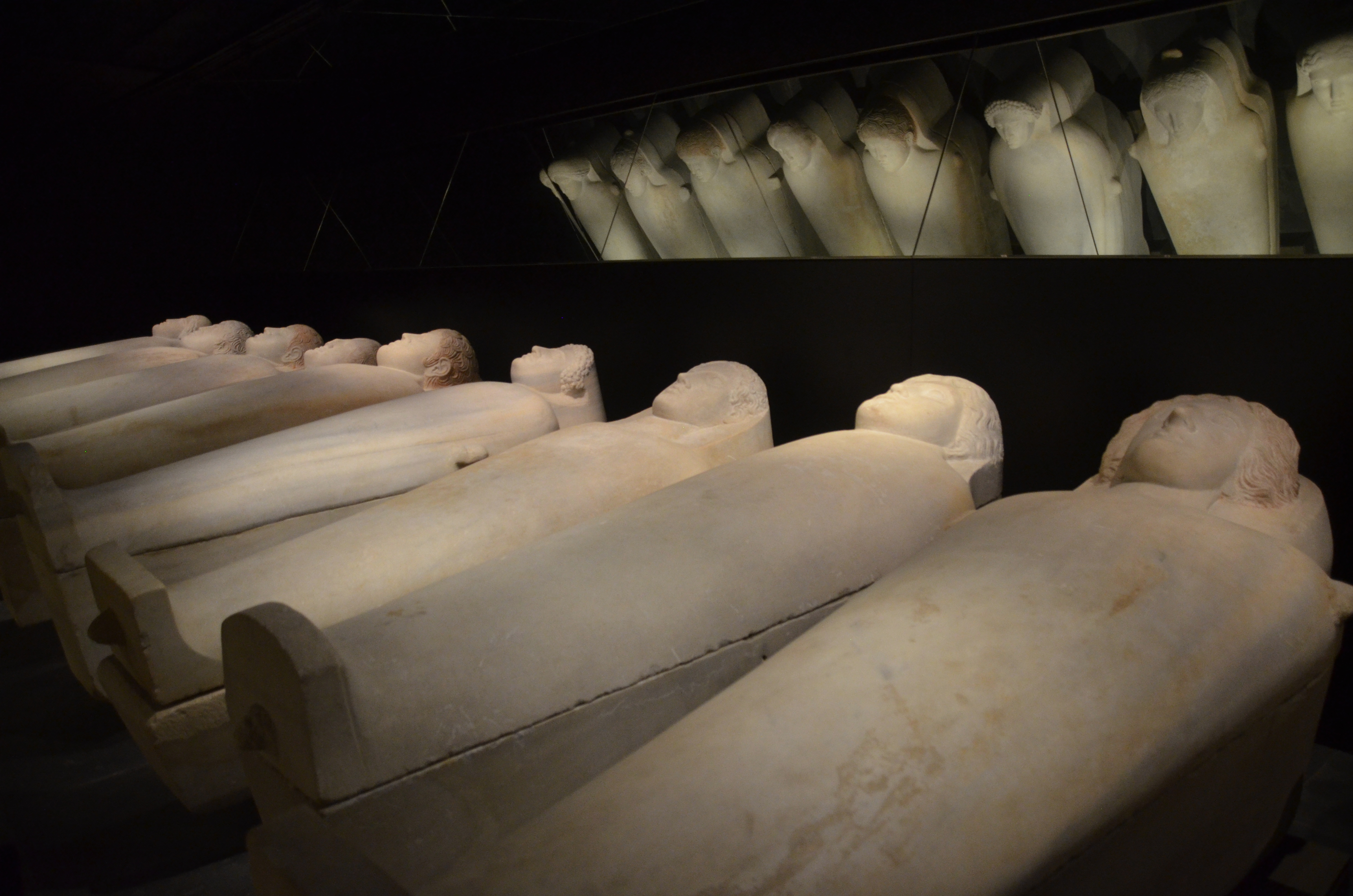
Later anthropoid sarcophagi from Sidon, 5th century BC. Known as the Ford Collection sarcophagi, now in the National Museum of Beirut.

Comparison between the original Egyptian type to which the Eshmunazar II and Tabnit I sarcophagi belong, and the later derivative anthropoid sarcophagi styles

The lid inscription was of great significance upon its discovery; it was the first Phoenician-language inscription to be discovered in Phoenicia proper. (Note: Lehmann wrote in 2013: "Alas, all these were either late or Punic, and came from Cyprus, from the ruins of Kition, from Malta, Sardinia, Athens, and Carthage, but not yet from the Phoenician homeland. The first Phoenician text as such was found as late as 1855, the Eshmunazor sarcophagus inscription from Sidon;" Turner wrote in 1855: "Its interest is greater both on this account and as being the first inscription properly so-called that has yet been found in Phoenicia proper, which had previously furnished only some coins and an inscribed gem. It is also the longest inscription hitherto discovered, that of Marseilles – which approaches it the nearest in the form of its characters, the purity of its language, and its extent – consisting of but 21 lines and fragments of lines.) Furthermore, this engraving forms the longest and most detailed Phoenician inscription ever found anywhere up to that point, and is now the second longest extant Phoenician inscription after the Karatepe bilingual.

Due to its length and level of preservation, the inscription offers valuable knowledge about the characteristics of the Phoenician language and, more specifically, of the Tyro-Sidonian dialect. Additionally, the inscription displays notable similarities to texts in other Semitic languages, evident in its idiomatic expressions, word combinations, and the use of repetition.

=== Stylistic impact on later Phoenician sarcophagi ===
The sarcophagi of Tabnit and Eshmunazar may have served as a model for the later sarcophagi of Sidon. After Tabnit and Eshmunazar II, sarcophagi continued to be used by Phoenician dignitaries, but with marked stylistic evolutions. These local anthropoid sarcophagi, built from the 5th century BC to the first half of the 4th century BC, continued to be carved in the form of a smooth, shapeless body, but used white marble, and the faces were progressively sculpted in more realistic Hellenic styles. It is uncertain whether they were imported from Greece or produced locally. This type of Phoenician sarcophagi has been found in the ruins of Phoenician colonies throughout the Mediterranean.

== See also ==
- Royal necropolis of Ayaa – Phoenician necropolis in Lebanon
  - Alexander Sarcophagus – 4th-century BC Phoenician royal coffin
  - Lycian sarcophagus of Sidon – 5th-century BC Phoenician royal coffin
- Ford Collection sarcophagi – Group of Phoenician marble sarcophagi found in Lebanon
- Royal necropolis of Byblos – Phoenician necropolis in Lebanon
- Temple of Eshmun – Ancient temple to the Phoenician god of healing in Lebanon
- Egyptian Stelae in the Levant
