= Habib Abela =

Consul in the town of Sidon, Lebanon

Habib Abela, sometimes Habib Abila, was a consul in the town of Sidon, Lebanon, and a member of the notable Abela family of merchants in 19th century.

He was involved in the archaeological discovery of the Sarcophagus of Eshmunazar II in 1855. In diplomatic affairs he was involved in the 1860 intercommunal crisis and in similar events during 1877 crisis.

Abela was descended from a Maltese medical doctor who was part of Napoleon's 1799 campaign to Acre. Initially serving as a dragoman for the British Consul in Sidon, he became an unpaid Vice Consul of Sidon. He ran a trading business with his brothers.

The family intermarried with other wealthy families in the region, for example the Durighello family, as described in an 1877 letter from the British Consul General in Beirut to the British Ambassador in Istanbul:

They [the Abela brothers] all hold Consular appointments under various Foreign Governments, and are connected by marriage with all, or almost all, their colleagues as well as with many wealthy and important families of the native Christians of Sidon, and likewise of Beyrout, Damascus and other places in Syria. They thus form a compact family body which certainly gives them a great advantage in addition to the privileges which they enjoy in virtue of their consular functions.
