= Aimé Péretié =

French diplomat and archaeologist (1808–1882)

Napoléon Antoine Aimé Péretié, commonly Aimé Péretié, (5 March 1808, Marseille – 8 April 1882, Beirut), was a French diplomat in the Levant and as a collector of oriental antiquities.

== Diplomatic career ==
From 1829 to 1834, he worked for the French consulate in Larnaca as a dragoman and chancellor.

In 1839, he was nominated “drogman sans residence fixe”, and by December 1850 he was chancellor of the French consulate general in Beirut. For a short period around 1853 he was French vice consul in Tripoli (Lebanon), and by 1855 was again chancellor of the French consulate general in Beirut.

In 1864, he was promoted vice consul of France in Beirut.

== Antiquities ==
In 1855, he donated a collection of medieval coins to the Bibliothèque nationale de France. In the same year he was involved in the discovery of the Sarcophagus of Eshmunazar II. In 1869, he was involved in the discovery of the Yehawmilk Stele.

He travelled to Cyprus for similar purposes. In 1850, he bought and sold several important objects including the Idalion Tablet.

== Family ==
His son Alfred became the French consul in Baghdad.
