= Sidon Mithraeum =

Former mithraeum discovered in Sidon, kept in the Louvre

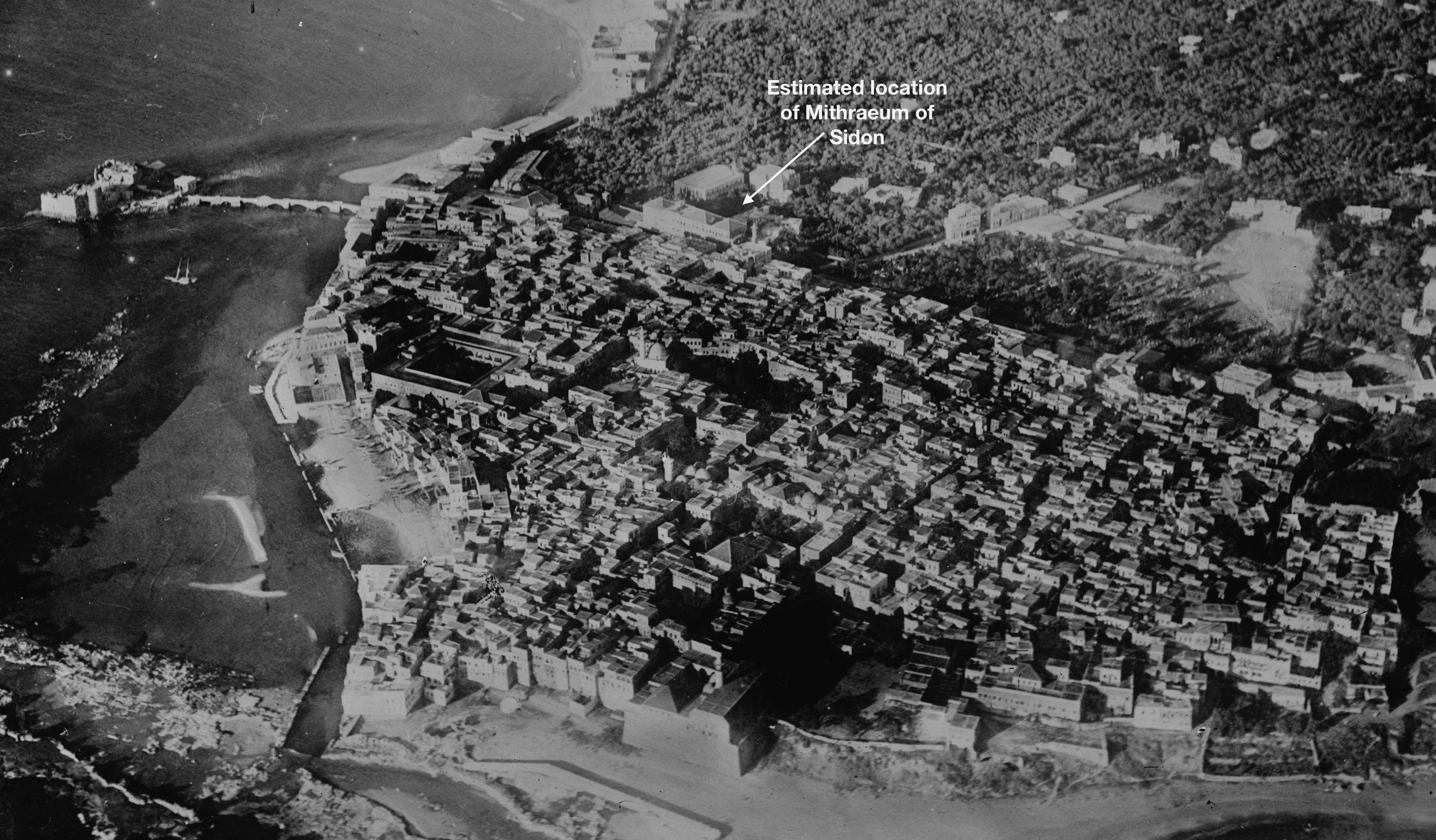
Estimated location of the Mithraeum at Sidon, in 1900-1920 aerial photo, pointing to 33°33′51″N 35°22′20″E

The Sidon Mithraeum was a Mithraeum in Sidon, Lebanon, discovered in the late 19th century by antiquarian Edmond Durighello and now lost. A number of statues and a marble bas-relief were found on site; these were part of the décor of a Mithraeum, an underground sanctuary dedicated to Mithras, an Iranian deity whose cult, reserved for initiates was especially popular among Roman soldiers. A brief note by the Durighello, who sold the sculptures to Louis De Clercq, offers a doubtful and fanciful description of the Mithreum. It is believed that the structure is located under the car park of the St. Nicholas Greek church in Sidon, but has not been excavated in modern times.

== Statues ==
A set of eight statues and a marble bas-relief from the Mithraeum were donated by Edmond Durighello to the Louvre, where they remain on display today. They have been catalogued in the Corpus Inscriptionum et Monumentorum Religionis Mithriacae as numbers 74–87.

The bas-relief represents one of the key scenes of Mithraism: the sacrifice of the bull by Mithras. This central cultic piece was surrounded in Sidon, as on other reliefs, by the signs of the zodiac and busts of the Four Seasons. The same image is featured on one of the statues, where Mithras, in Persian attire, tight-fitting trousers, and a Phrygian cap, slays the animal. The other statues depict the god carrying the bull, two of his attendants, Cautes and Cautopates, each holding a torch, two other characters that are more difficult to identify, each characterized by a double axe which may link them to the cult of Jupiter Dolichenus, another Near Eastern deity popular among Roman soldiers. Hecate, a Greek deity of magic is depicted on a marble statue surrounded by dancers, possible the Hours. Finally a figure with a lion's head, probably a personification of Aion (or Chronos), a deity of eternal time. The statues are of varying sizes but of meticulous craftsmanship.

=== Gallery of statues at the Louvre ===
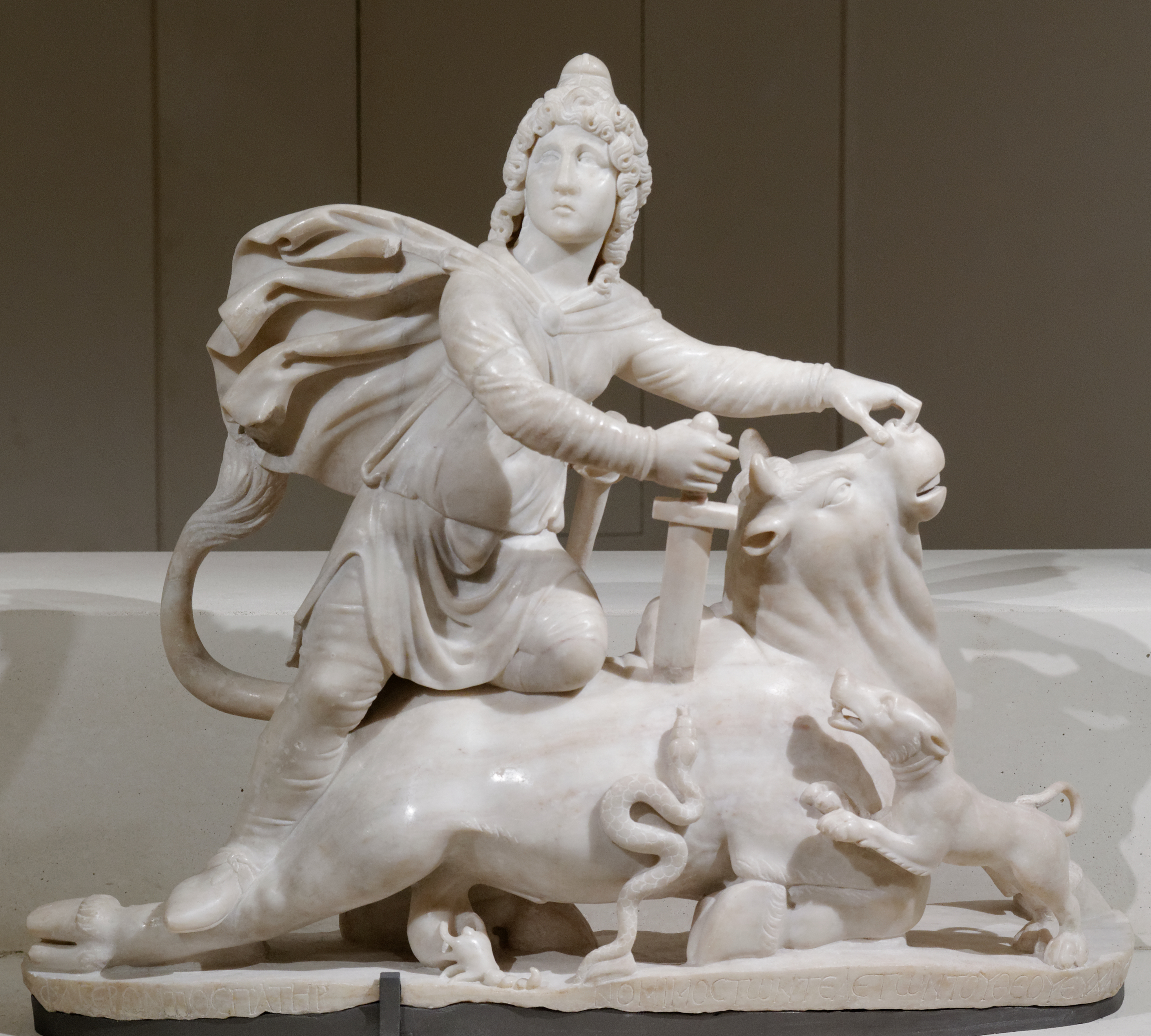
Mithraic tauroctony

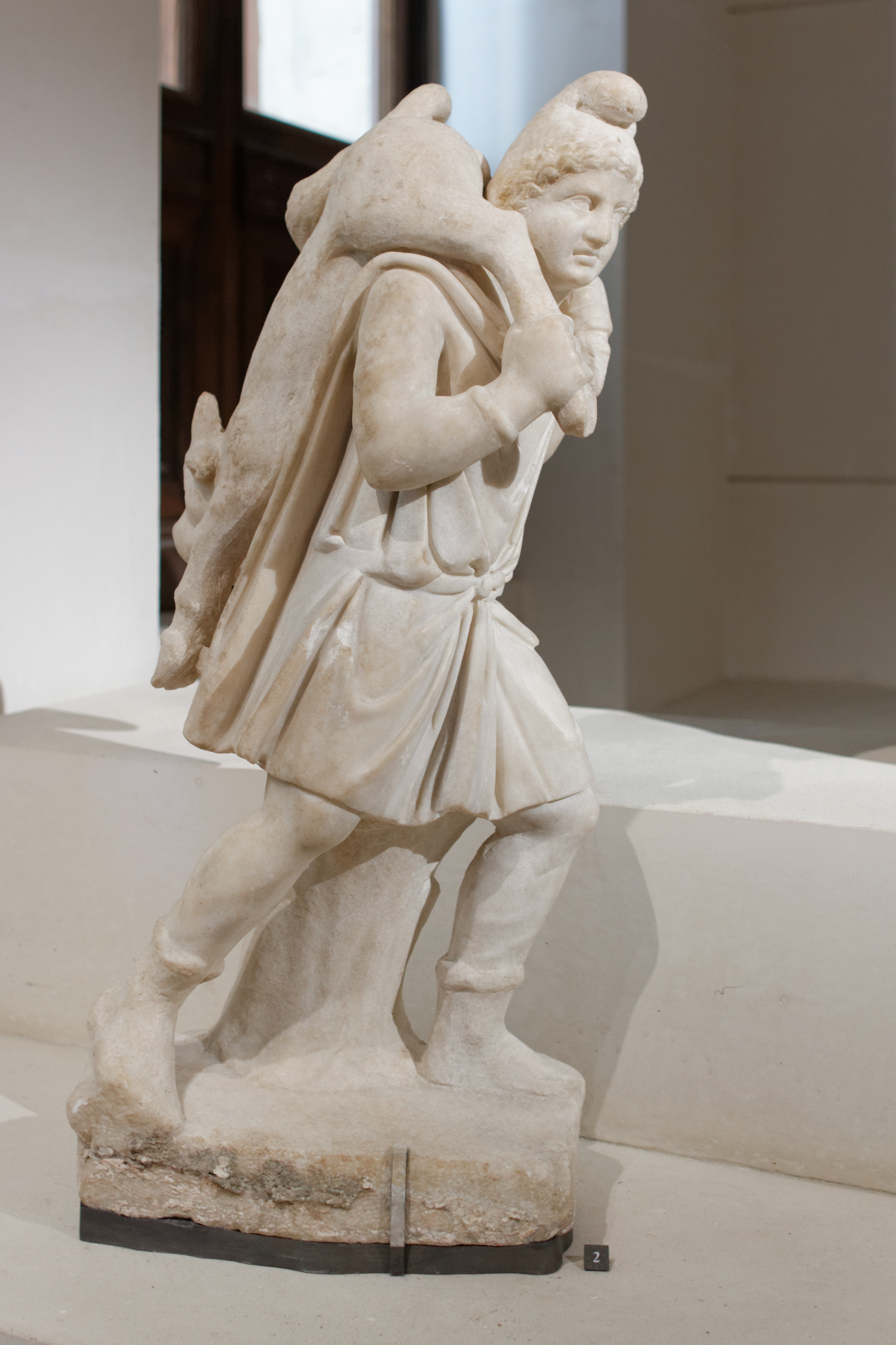
Mithras carrying the bull

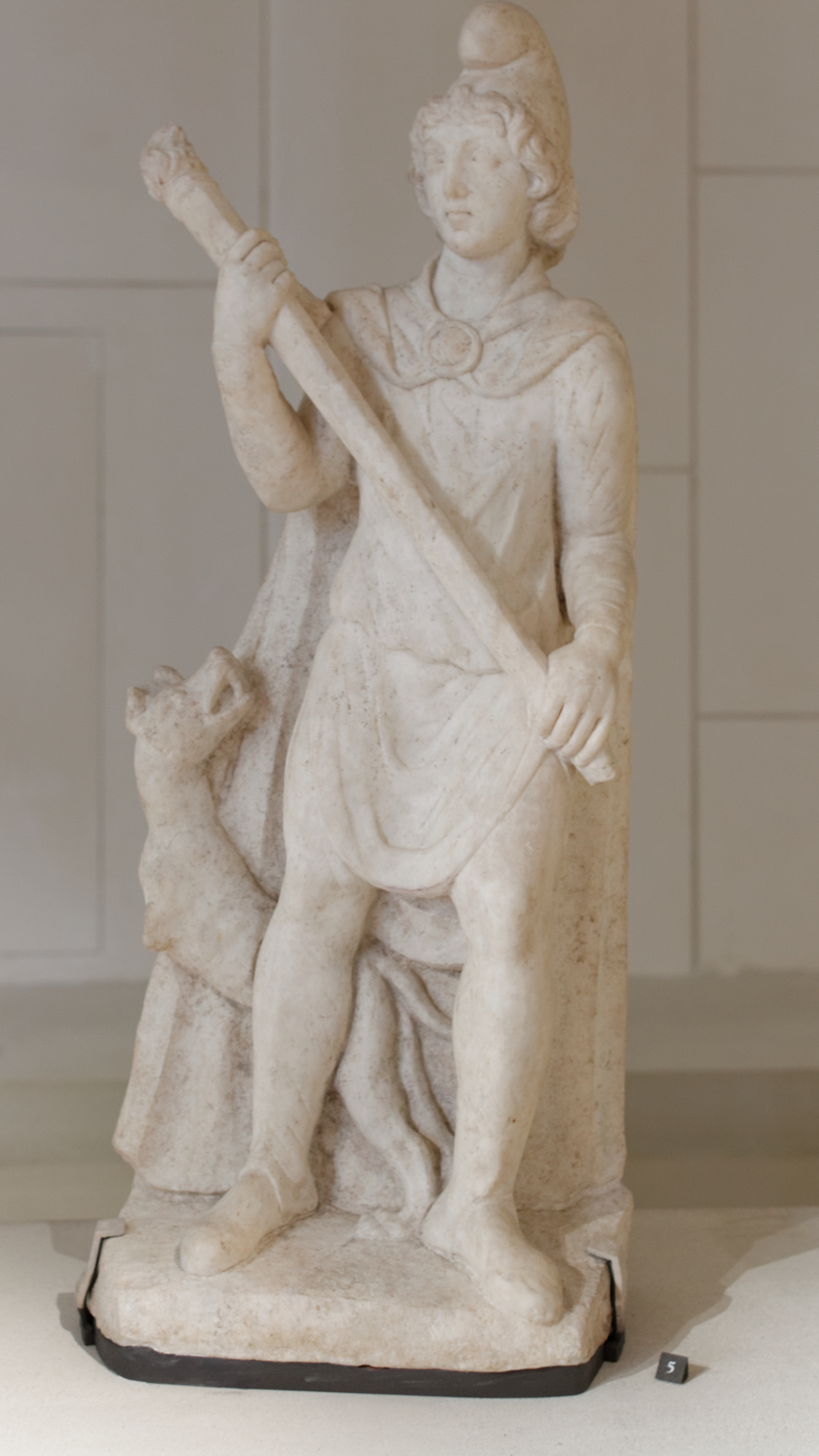
Cautes

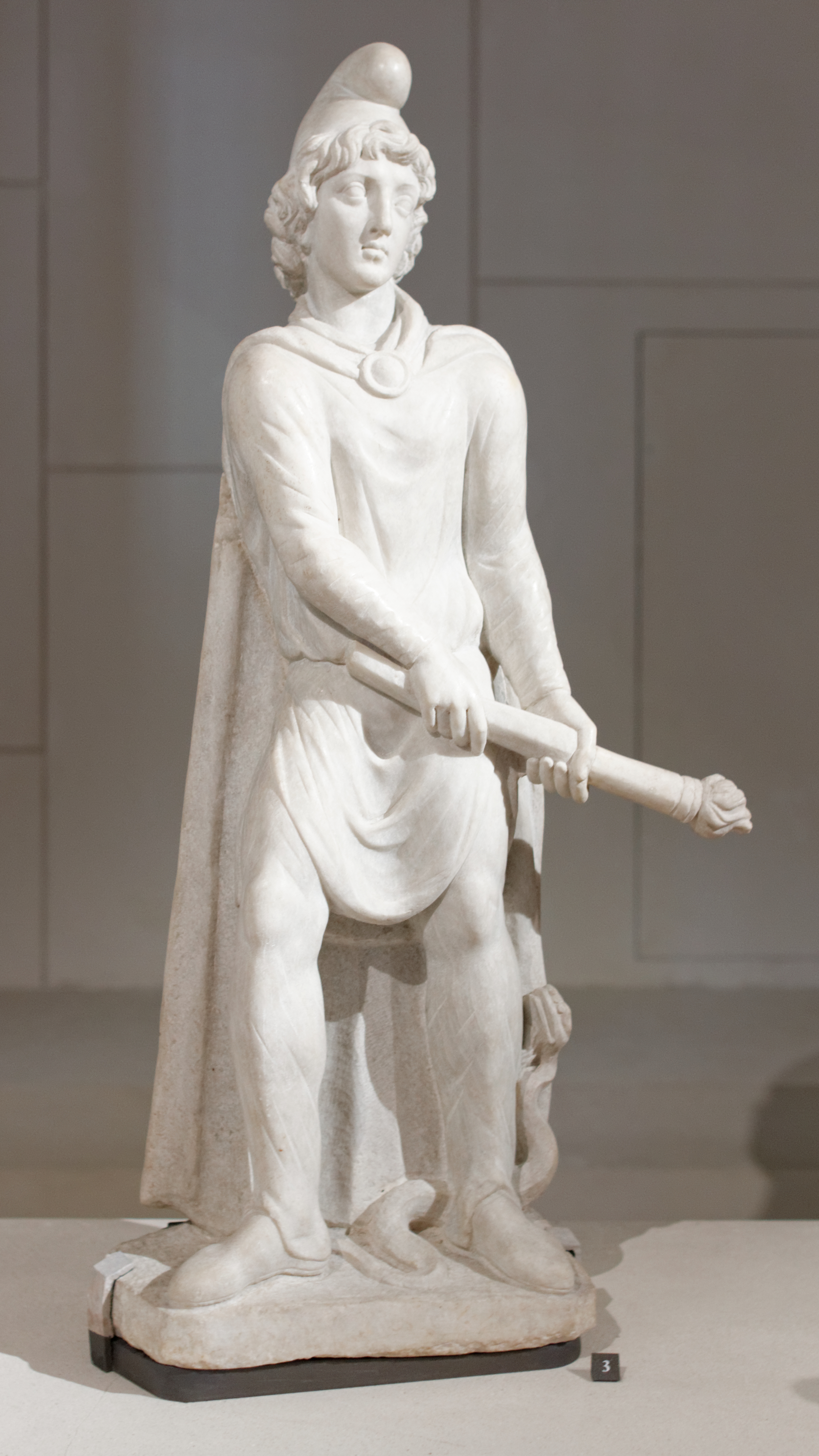
Cautopates

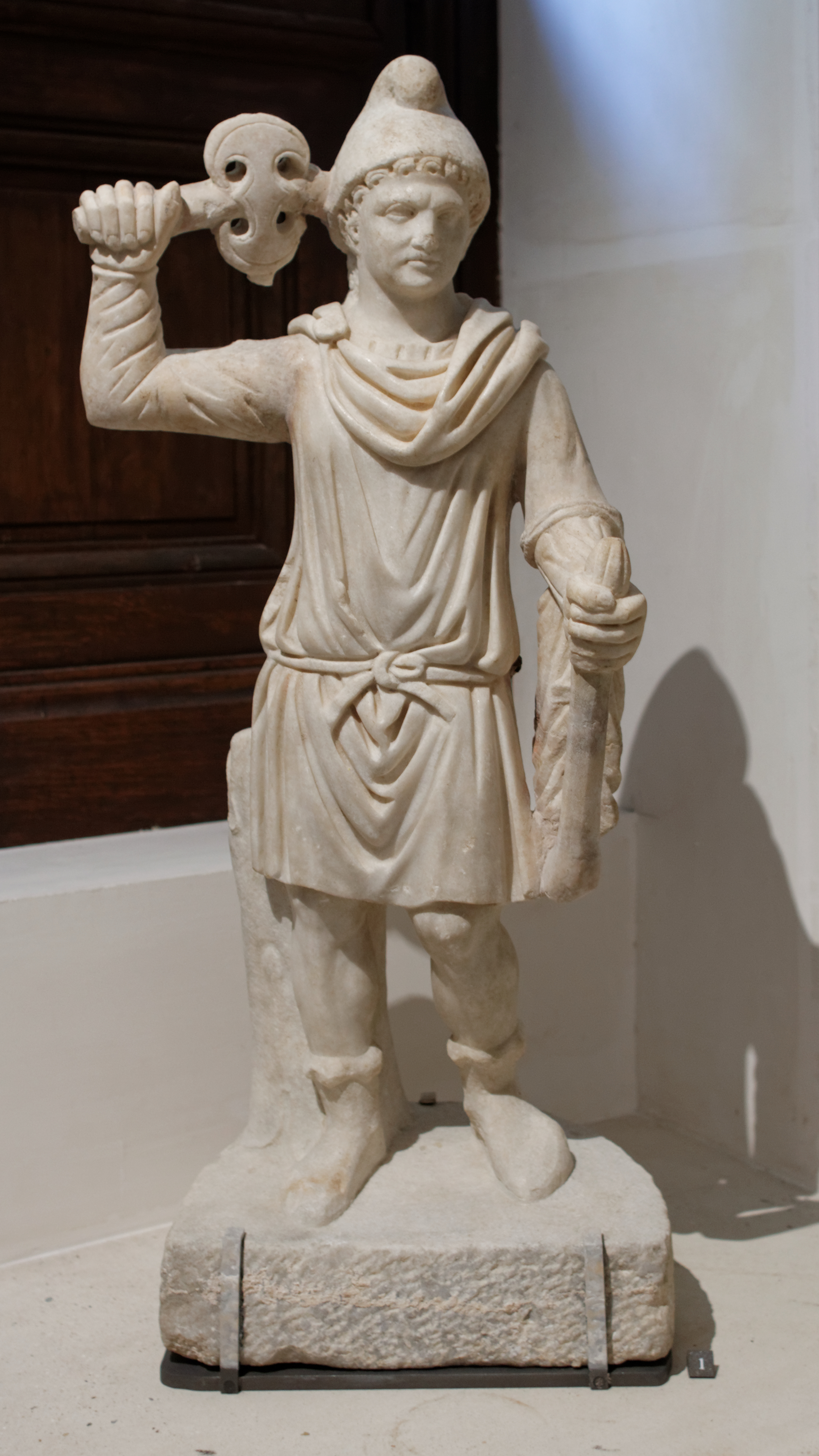
Cautes

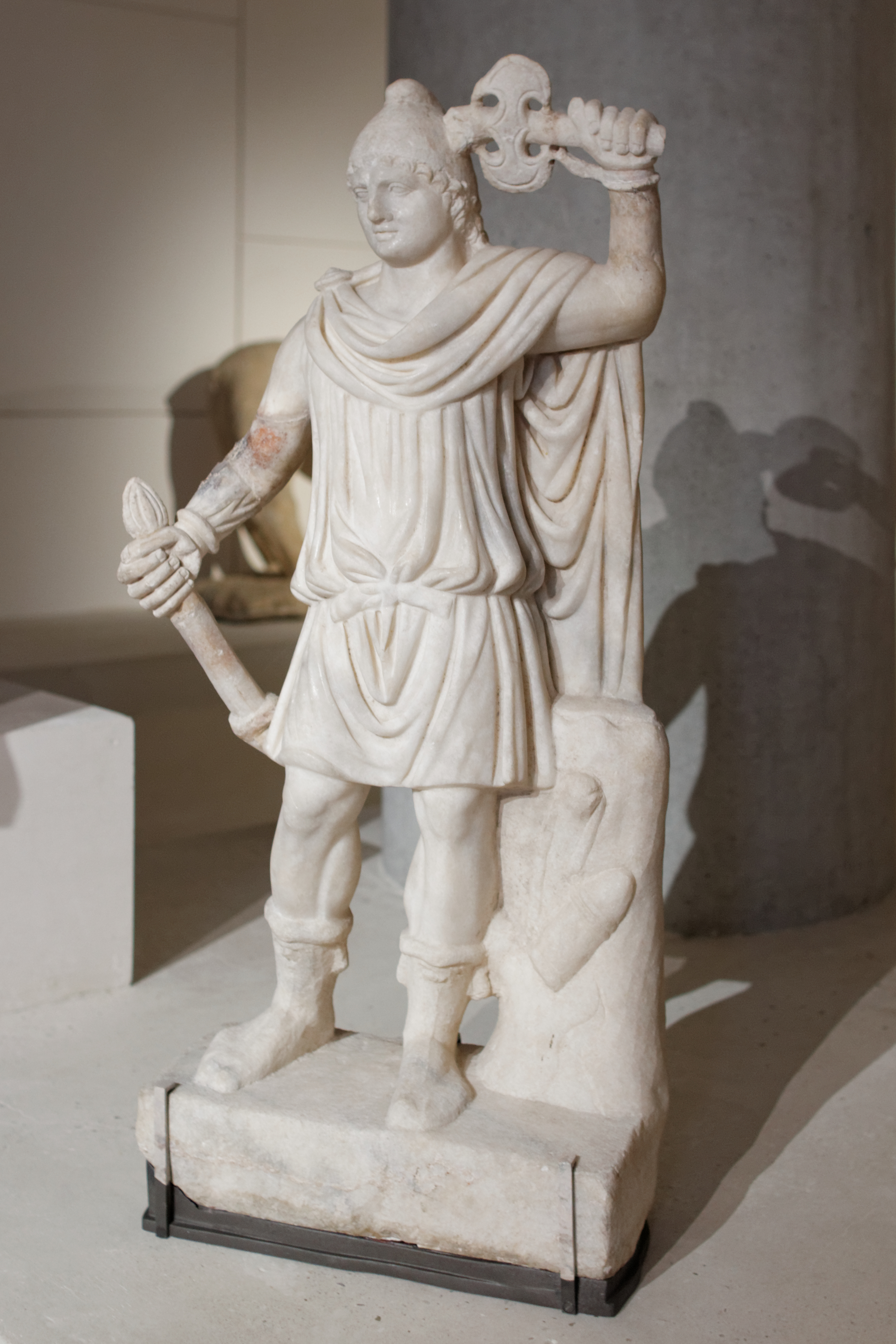
Cautes

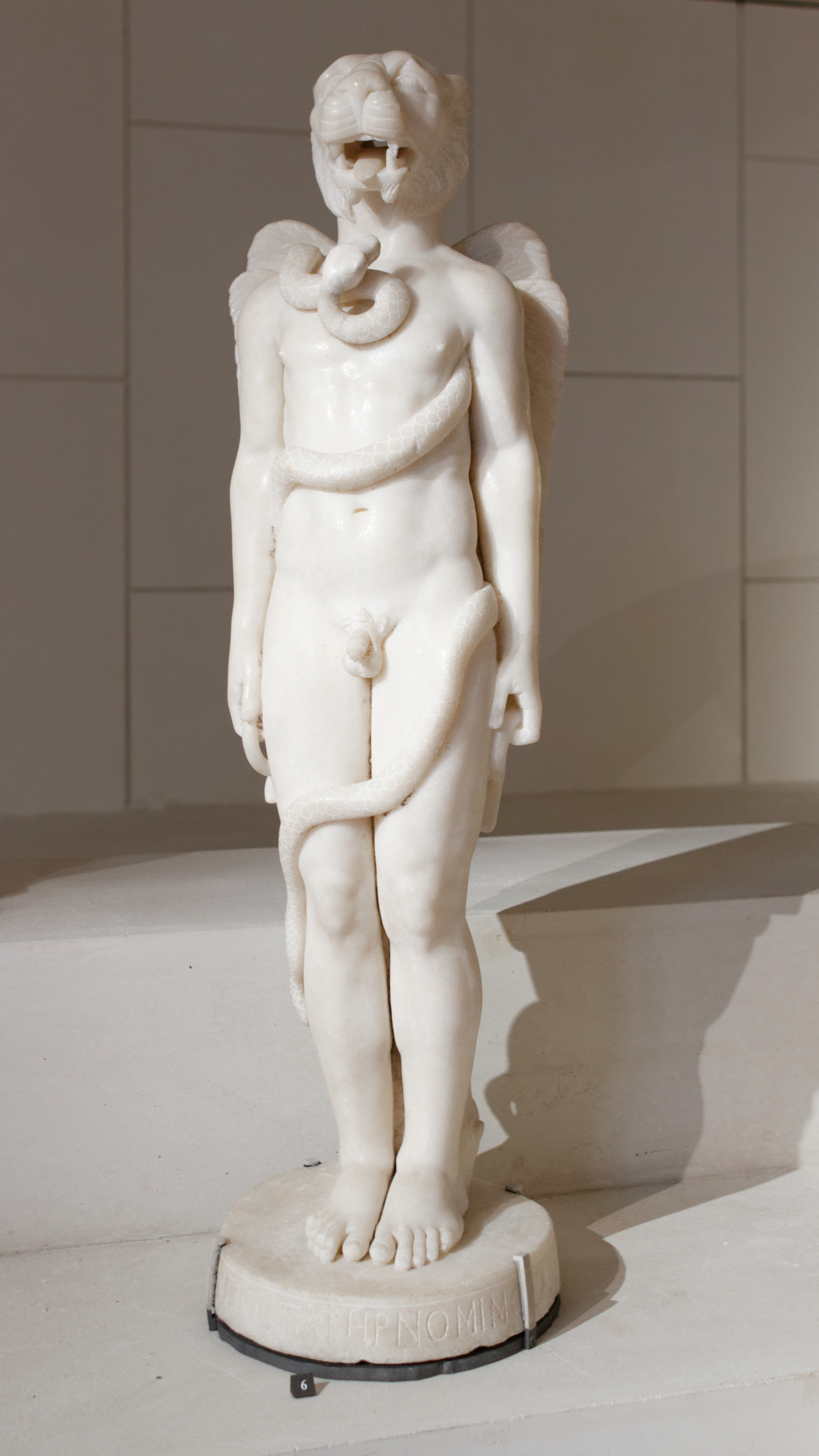
Mithraic Kronos

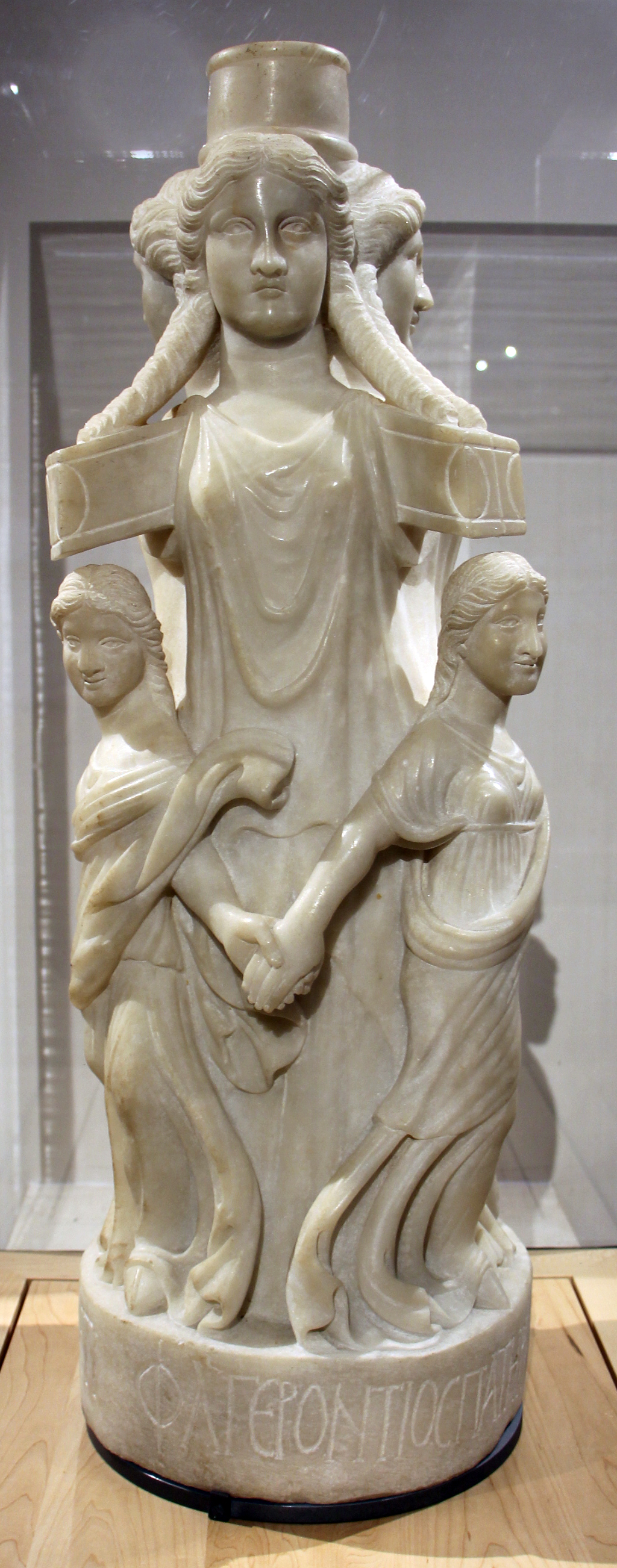
Hecate

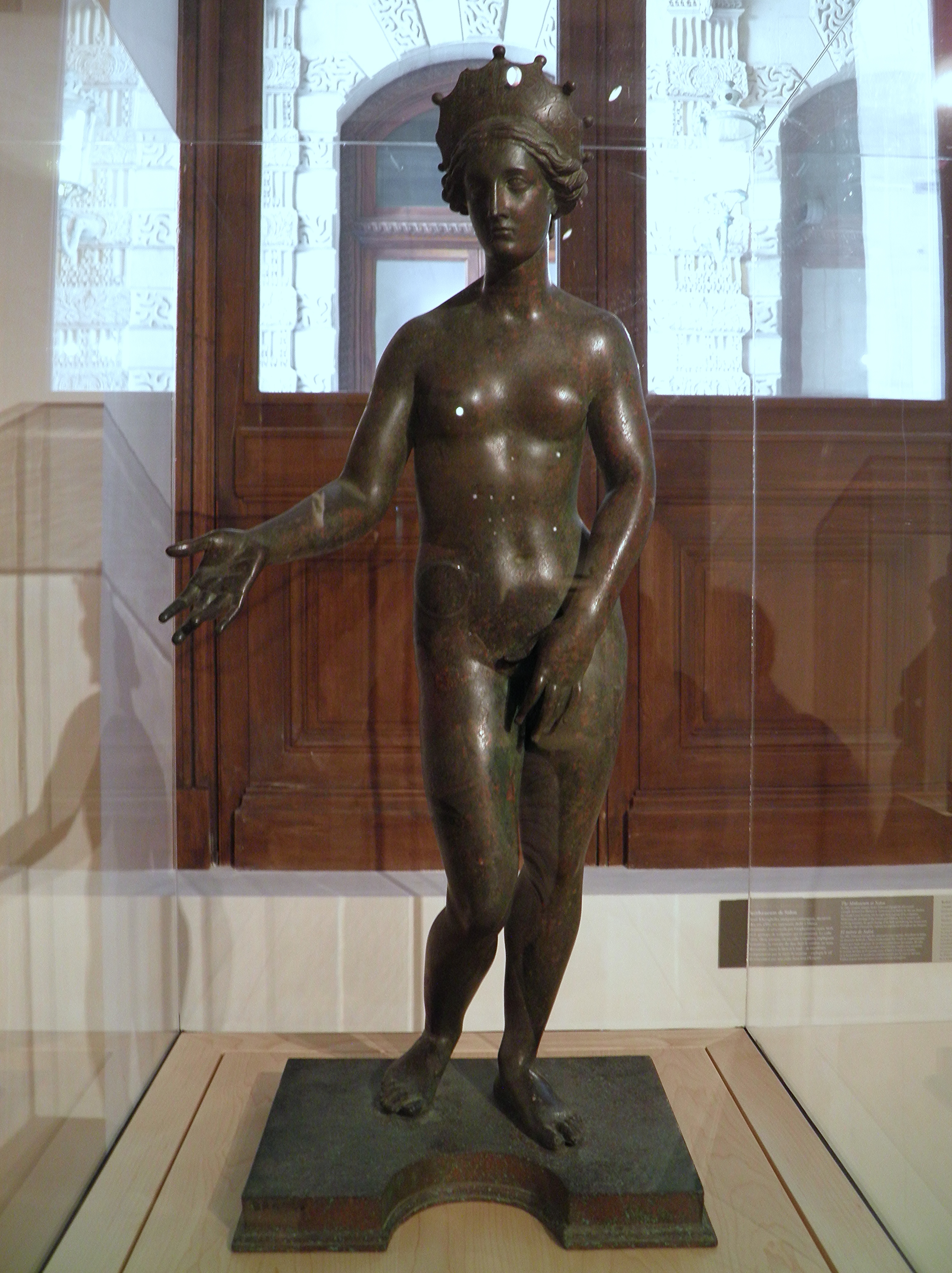
Bronze statuette of Venus, from the Mithraeum at Sidon

== Inscriptions and dating ==
Three of the statues, Mithras slaying the bull, Hecate and Aion, bear an inscription on their base in Ancient Greek. The inscriptions detail that they were offered by a certain Flavios Gerontios, a high-ranking official of the Mithraic order. They also provide a date, according to a system used in Sidon, corresponding to the year 389 AD. This group represents the most recent dedication to Mithras known to date. These statues serve as an important reference point in the evolution of sculpture in Roman Phoenicia at the end of antiquity. Their donation by Flavios Gerontios further confirms that the Mithraic cult was still flourishing in Sidon despite the imperial edicts condemning paganism, the persistence of which is now well known through many other documents.

== Sources ==
- Baratte, François (1998). "5 - La Phénicie Romaine" [5 - Roman Phoenicia]. Liban: l'autre rive : exposition présentée à l'Institut du monde arabe du 27 octobre au 2 mai 1999 [Lebanon: The Other Shore: Exhibition Presented at the Institute of the Arab World from October 27 to May 2, 1999] (in French). Flammarion. ISBN 9782080125163.
- Pearse, Roger (2013a). "CIMRM 78-79 - Lion-headed statuette. Sidon. In the Louvre". www.tertullian.org.
- Pearse, Roger (2013b). "CIMRM 76 - Tauroctony statuette, Sidon. In the Louvre". www.tertullian.org.
- Will, Ernest (1950). "La date du Mithréum de Sidon". Syria. Archéologie, Art et histoire. 27 (3): 261–269. doi:10.3406/syria.1950.4593.
