= Durighello family =

The Durighello family were a family of merchants in 19th century Sidon (modern Lebanon) notable for their contributions to archaeology.

== Family members ==
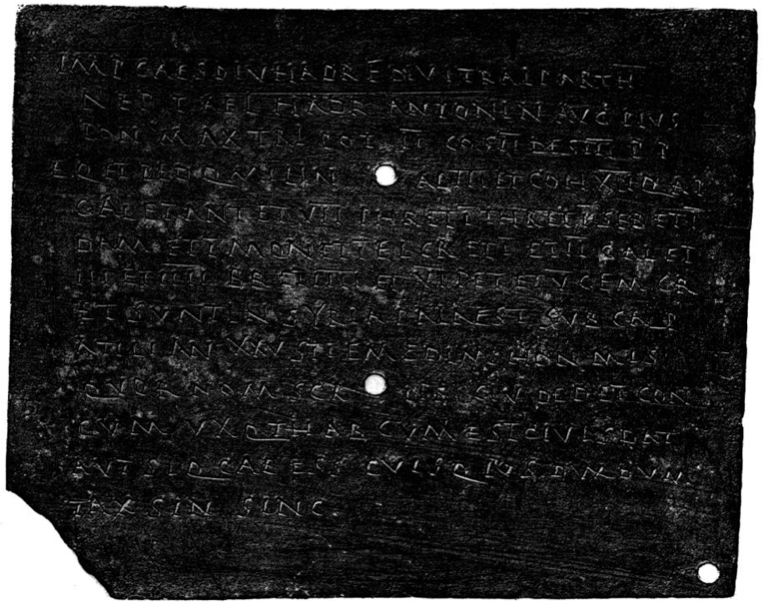
"Syria Palaestin[a]" mentioned in a 139 CE Roman military diploma donated to the Louvre by Joseph-Ange Durighello

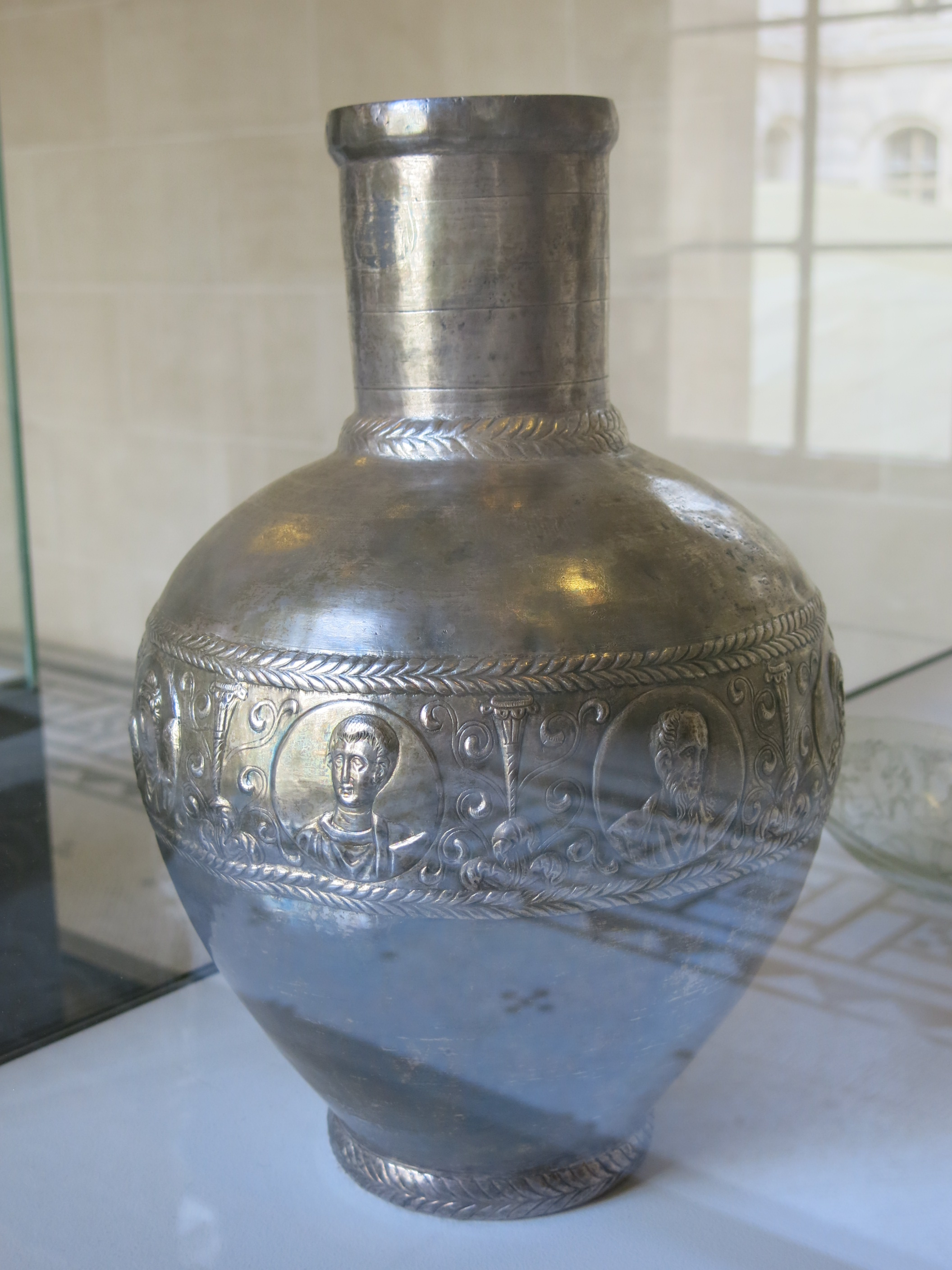
Emesa Vase, donated to the Louvre in 1895 by Joseph-Ange Durighello

- Angielo Durighello (1767-1841): moved to Aleppo in 1787 working for the consul of Venice to Aleppo. Became the consul of Spain in 1802, later becoming Consul-General of Spain, Sweden and Norway, France and the United States
- Alphonse (1822-1896), the son of Angielo, became a consul in Aleppo, then Sidon, becoming agent in the French Consulate in 1853 – in charge of the Khan al-Franj – and vice-consul in 1859. Discovered the Sarcophagus of Eshmunazar II in 1855, later becoming a partner to Ernest Renan in his Mission de Phénicie.
- Edmond (1854-1922), son of Alphonse, began archaeological digs with Alphonse from 1880 in 1881 discovered the Sidon Mithraeum. Gained a reputation for illegal / poorly recorded excavations.
- Joseph-Ange (1863-1924), the youngest son of Alphonse and arguably the most well known member of the family, became a merchant in Sidon in 1882, then in Beirut in 1895. Later moved to Paris as an art dealer. Made significant donations to the Louvre, such as the Abdmiskar cippus

== List of notable artifacts associated with the Durighello family ==
- Syria Palestine 139 AD Roman Military Diploma
- Emesa Vase
- Sarcophagus of Eshmunazar II
- Sidon Mithraeum
- Abdmiskar cippus

== Bibliography ==
- Klat, Michel G. (2002). "The Durighello Family" (PDF). Archaeology & History in Lebanon (16). London: Lebanese British Friends of the National Museum: 98–108. Archived (PDF) from the original on 2021-02-11.
- "Les Durighello : chasseurs d'antiquités ou pionniers de l'archéologie à Sidon ?". Collège de France (in French). 2018-04-25.
- Tahan, Lina G. (2017-02-01). "Trafficked Lebanese Antiquities: Can They Be Repatriated from European Museums?". Journal of Eastern Mediterranean Archaeology and Heritage Studies. 5 (1). The Pennsylvania State University Press: 27–35. doi:10.5325/jeasmedarcherstu.5.1.0027. ISSN 2166-3548. JSTOR 10.5325/jeasmedarcherstu.5.1.0027. S2CID 164865577.
- "Durighello's Letter about the Sidon Mithraeum". The Tertullian Project.
