= Mission de Phénicie =

Book by Ernest Renan

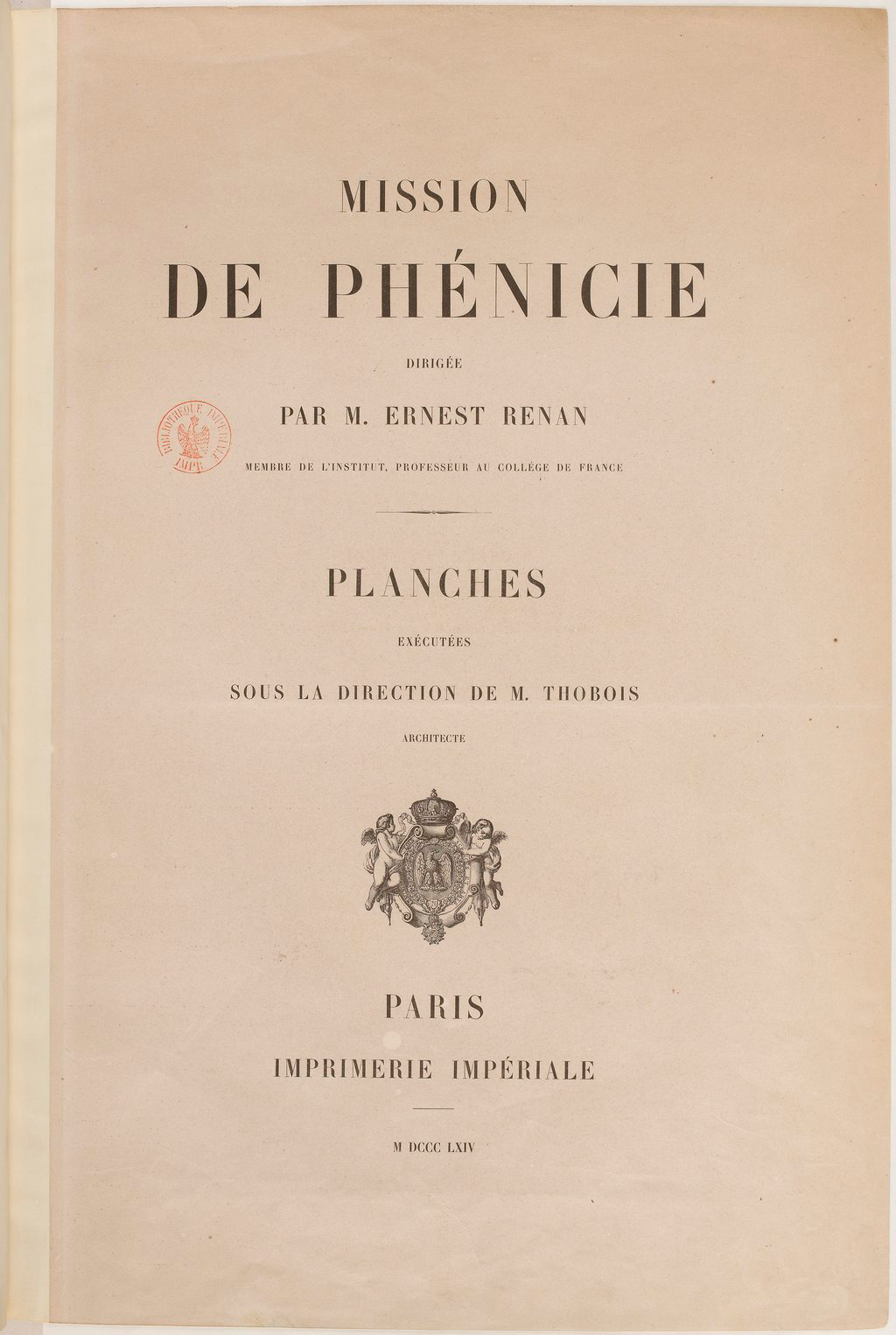
- Mission de Phénicie cover (plates volume)
- Author: Ernest Renan
- Language: French
- Genre: Archaeology
- Publisher: L'imprimerie Impériale De France
- Publication date: 1864
- Publication place: France

The Mission de Phénicie was the first major archaeological mission to Lebanon and Syria. It took place in 1860-61 by a French team led by Ernest Renan. Renan was entrusted with the mission in October 1860, after French interest had been sparked by the 1855 discovery of the Sarcophagus of Eshmunazar II.

The Phoenician artefacts and inscriptions that were discovered by the mission were published in Renan's Mission de Phénicie (1864–74; “Phoenician Expedition”), published by Imprimerie impériale in Paris 1864, and republished by Beyrouth in 1997.

== Volumes ==
- Text: and
- Plates: and
- Catalogue des objets provenant de la Mission de Phénicie

== Bibliography ==
- Renan, Ernest (1864). Mission de Phénicie (in French). Paris: Imprimerie impériale.
