= William Wadden Turner =

American philologist and librarian

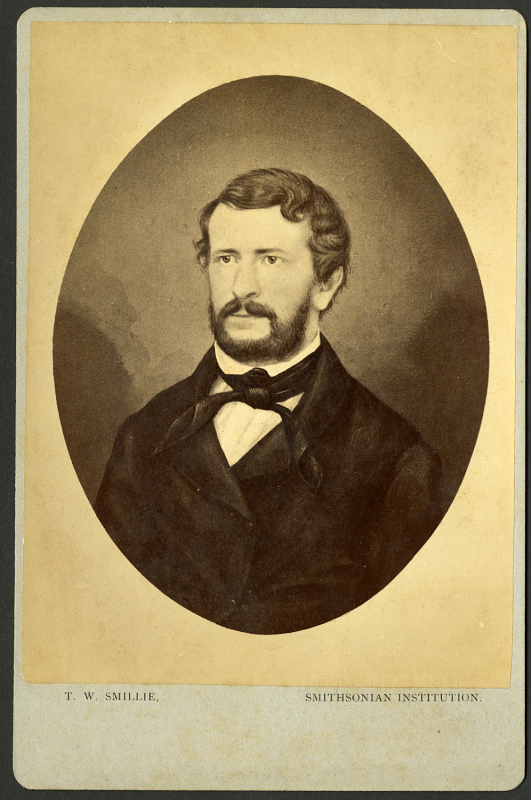
- Born: October 23, 1810; London
- Died: November 29, 1859 (aged 49); Washington, D.C.
- Alma mater: Yale University
- Occupation: Librarian, philologist
- Employer: Smithsonian Institution; Union Theological Seminary; United States Patent and Trademark Office

William Wadden Turner (October 23, 1810 – November 29, 1859) was an English-born American philologist and librarian.

Turner was born in London, England, October 23, 1810; died in Washington, D.C., 29 November 29, 1859. He came to New York in 1818, and, after a public-school education, was apprenticed to the carpenter's trade, but subsequently became a printer. At the age of twenty-six he was master of French, Latin, German, and Hebrew. Afterward he studied Arabic with Professor Isaac Nordheimer, and they proposed to write together an Arabic grammar, but, receiving no encouragement, they prepared instead A Critical Grammar of the Hebrew Language (2 vols., New York, 1838); and Chrestomathy: or A Grammatical Analysis of Selections from the Hebrew Scriptures, with an Exercise in Hebrew Composition " (1838), also a Hebrew and Chaldee Concordance to the Old Testament (1842). In order to superintend the printing of these books, Turner removed to New Haven, as the only sufficient supply of oriental type was to be found there and at Andover. He was engaged in setting the type during the day, and spent his evenings in preparing the manuscript. On the completion of the works, Turner added to his linguistic attainments a knowledge of Sanskrit and most of the other chief Asiatic languages, and later he turned his attention to the languages of the North American Indians. He edited a Vocabulary of the Jargon or Trade Language of Oregon (1853), and Grammar and Dictionary of the Yoruba Language (1858), which was issued by the Smithsonian institution. In 1842 he was elected professor of oriental literature in Union Theological Seminary, New York City, and he continued in that office until 1852, when he was called to Washington by the commissioner of patents to take charge of the library of that department. He was a member of the American Oriental Society, and secretary of the National Institute for the Promotion of Science. Turner was considered in his day the most skillful proof-reader in the United States. In addition to the literary labors that have been already mentioned, he translated from the German Friedrich Ludwig Georg von Raumer's America and the American People (New York, 1845), and was associated with Dr. P. J. Kaufmann in the translation of the 12th German ed. of Ferdinand Mackeldey's Compendium of Modern Civil Law (London, 1845). He also translated William Freund's Latin-German Lexicon for Ethan A. Andrews's Latin-English Lexicon (New York, 1851).
