= Stelae of Nahr el-Kalb =

Archaeological site in Lebanon

Coordinates: 33.955530°N 35.596696°E

Commemorative stelae of Nahr el-Kalb
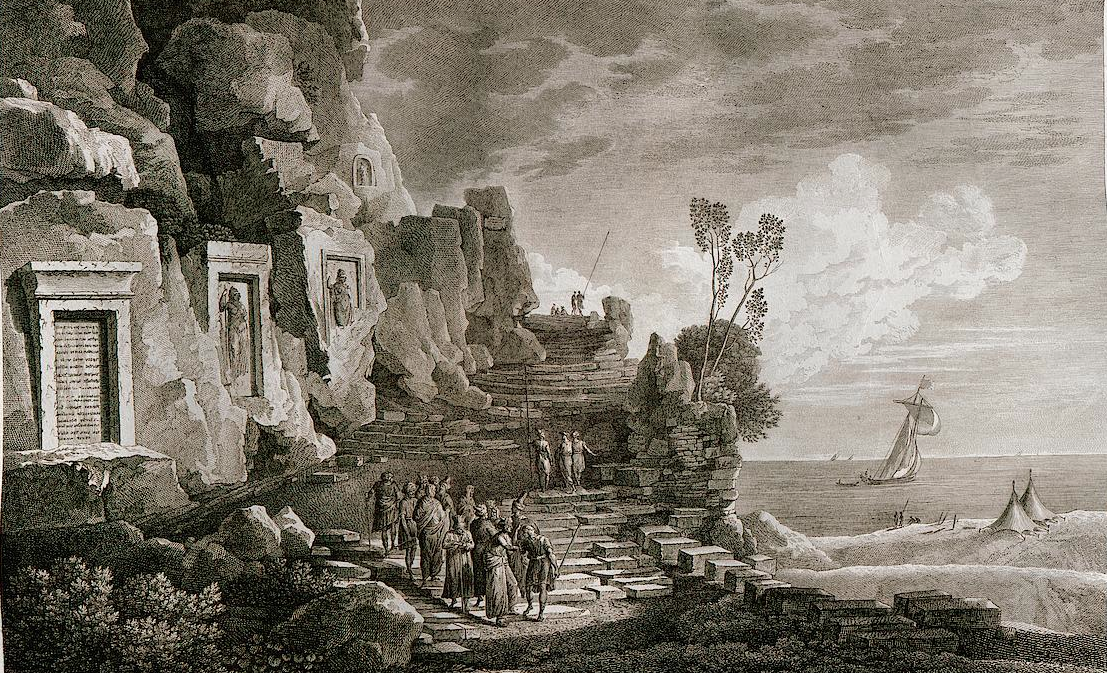
- A group of the inscriptions as depicted by Louis-François Cassas in 1799
- Material: Limestone
- Writing: Egyptian hieroglyphs, Assyrian cuneiform, Latin, Greek, Arabic, French and English
- Created: c.1500 BC – AD 1946
- Present location: in situ

Location
- Location in Lebanon

The commemorative stelae of Nahr el-Kalb are a group of over 20 inscriptions and rock reliefs carved into the limestone rocks around the estuary of the Nahr al-Kalb (Dog River) in Lebanon, just north of Beirut.

The inscriptions include three Egyptian hieroglyphic stelae from pharaohs including Ramesses II, six cuneiform inscriptions from Neo-Assyrian and Neo-Babylonian kings including Esarhaddon and Nebuchadnezzar II, Roman, Latin and Greek inscriptions, Arabic inscriptions from the Egyptian Mamluk sultan Barquq and the Druze prince Fakhr-al-Din II, a memorial to Napoleon III's 1860 intervention in Lebanon and a dedication to the 1943 independence of Lebanon from France. As such, the site has been said to summarise all of Lebanon's history in one place.

The earliest European to identify the site was the 17th-century traveller Henry Maundrell in 1697, and Franz Heinrich Weissbach was the first editor of the inscriptions in 1922.

In 2005, the stelae at the river were listed in the UNESCO Memory of the World initiative.

== Description ==
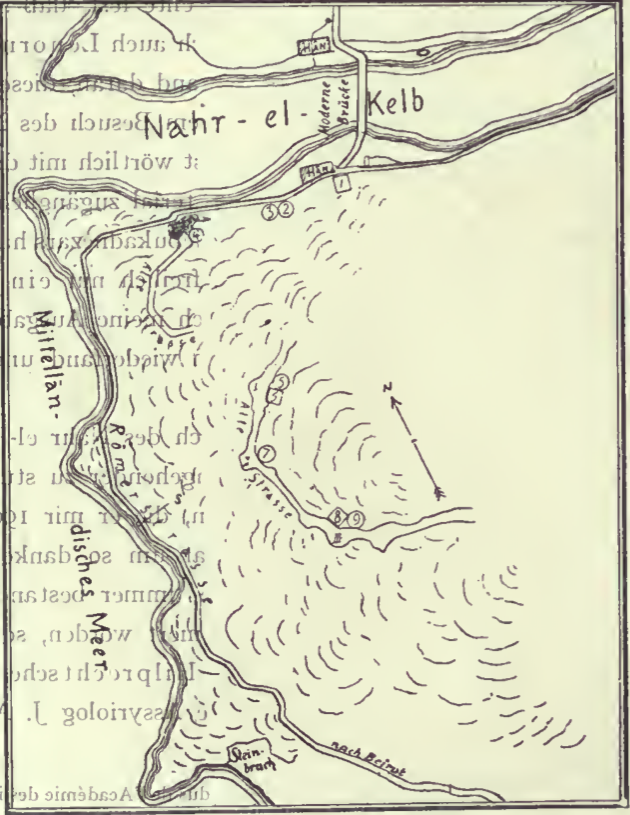
Map of the inscriptions, 1887. The number 1-9 are Egyptian inscriptions (square numbers) and Assyrian (circled numbers). The Babylonian inscriptions is on the north bank (small oval sign) and on the western road is the Roman inscription (the letter S and small arrow).

Past generals and conquerors have traditionally built monuments at the mouth of the Nahr al-Kalb. Ramses II, Nebuchadnezzar, Esarhaddon, Caracalla, and even armies from modern-day France and Great Britain have engaged in this practice.

The inscriptions are carved on a strategic location commanding the north–south coastal road along the Eastern Mediterranean. The earliest inscription is that of Ramesses II, and relates to the New Kingdom of Egypt's control of the region. The earliest Egyptian incursions into the region were many centuries earlier, as recorded by the Autobiography of Weni (c. 2280 BC) and the Sebek-khu Stele (c. 1860 BC).

The earliest European to identify the site was the 17th-century traveller Henry Maundrell in 1697, who wrote of the river crossing:

To accommodate the passage, you have a path of above two yards breadth cut along its side, at a great height above the water; being the work of the emperor Antoninus... The memory of which good work is perpetuated by an inscription, engraven on a table plained in the side of the natural rock, not far from the entrance into the way... In passing this way, we observed, in the sides of the rock above us, several tables of figures carved; which seemed to promise something of antiquity... as if the old way had gone in that region, before Antoninus cut the other more convenient passage a little lower. In several places hereabouts, we saw strange antique figures of men, carved in the natural rock, and in bigness equal to the life. Close by each figure was a large table, plained in the side of the rock, and bordered round with mouldings. Both the effigies and the tables appeared to have been anciently inscribed all over: but the characters are now so defaced, that nothing but the footsteps of them were visible; only there was one of the figures that had both its lineaments and its inscriptions entire.

Other famous figures who have passed by the area but did not leave any inscriptions behind include Alexander the Great and Saladin.

== Inscriptions ==
=== Egyptian inscriptions ===
Three Egyptian hieroglyphic inscriptions are known, all of which bear the cartouche of Ramses II. This was first identified by Karl Richard Lepsius. At least one of these is thought to have been placed during the Pharaoh's first campaign in the Levant, and set the Nahr al-Kalb as the border between Egypt's province of Canaan and the possessions of the Hittites.

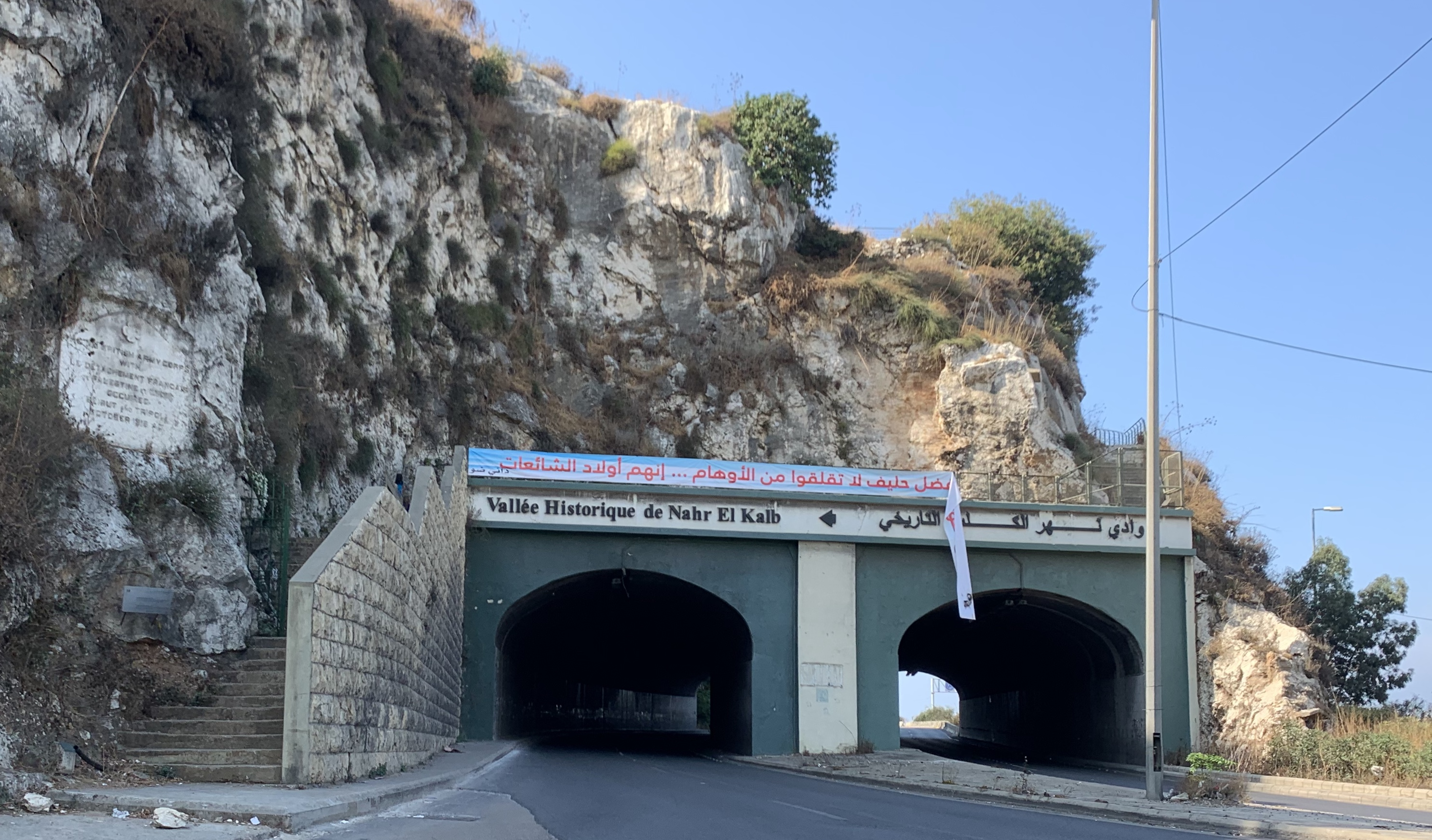
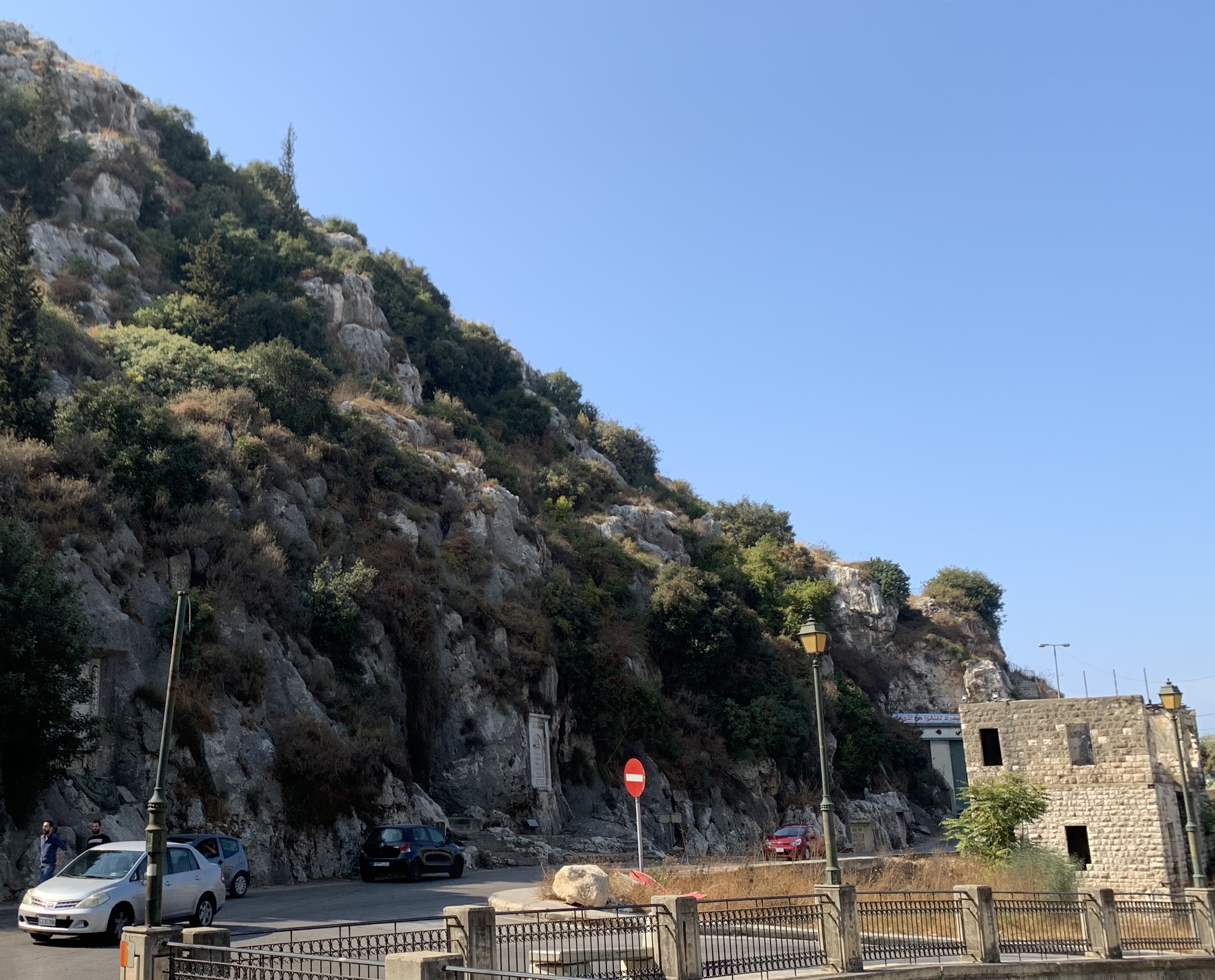
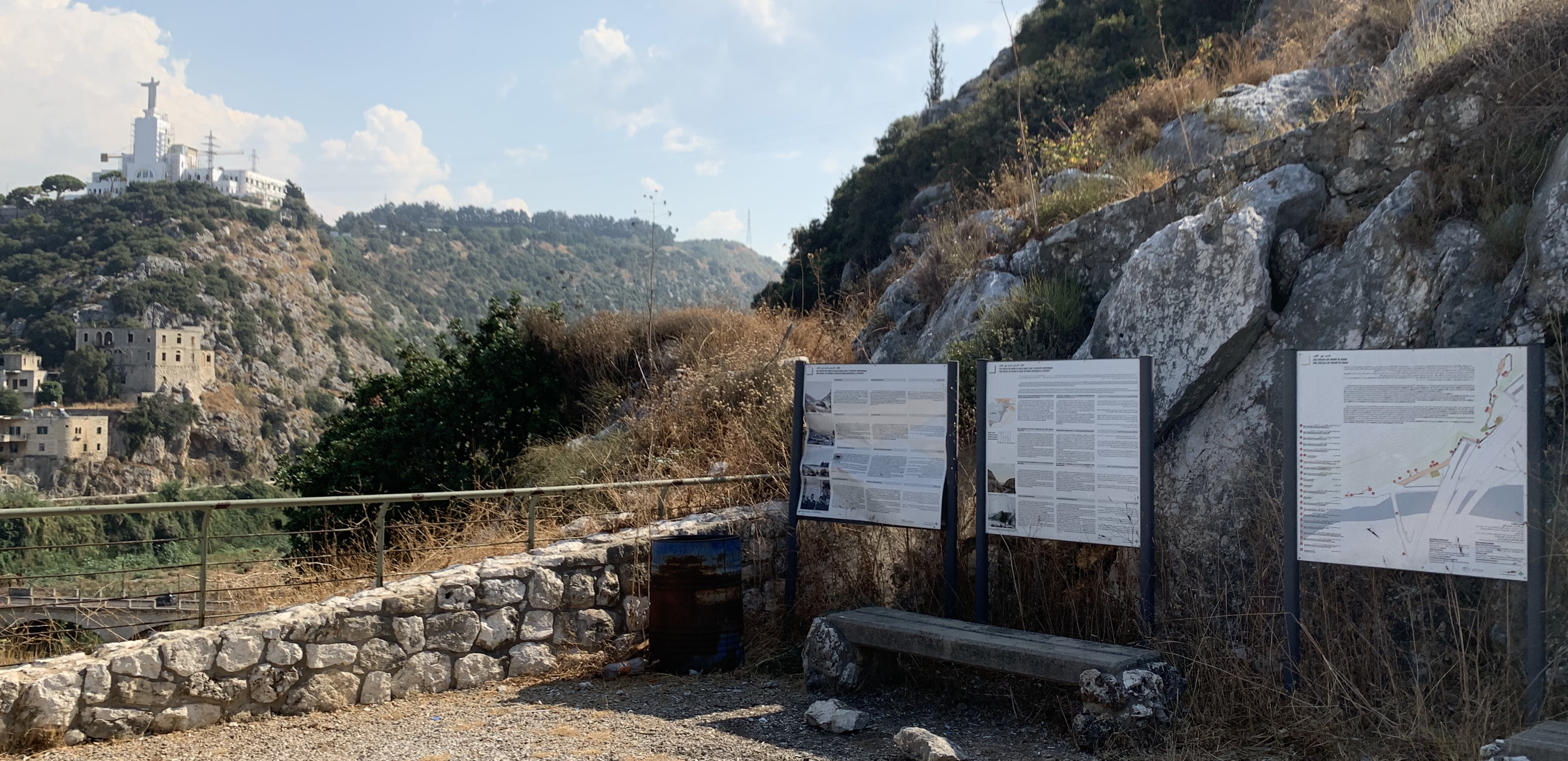
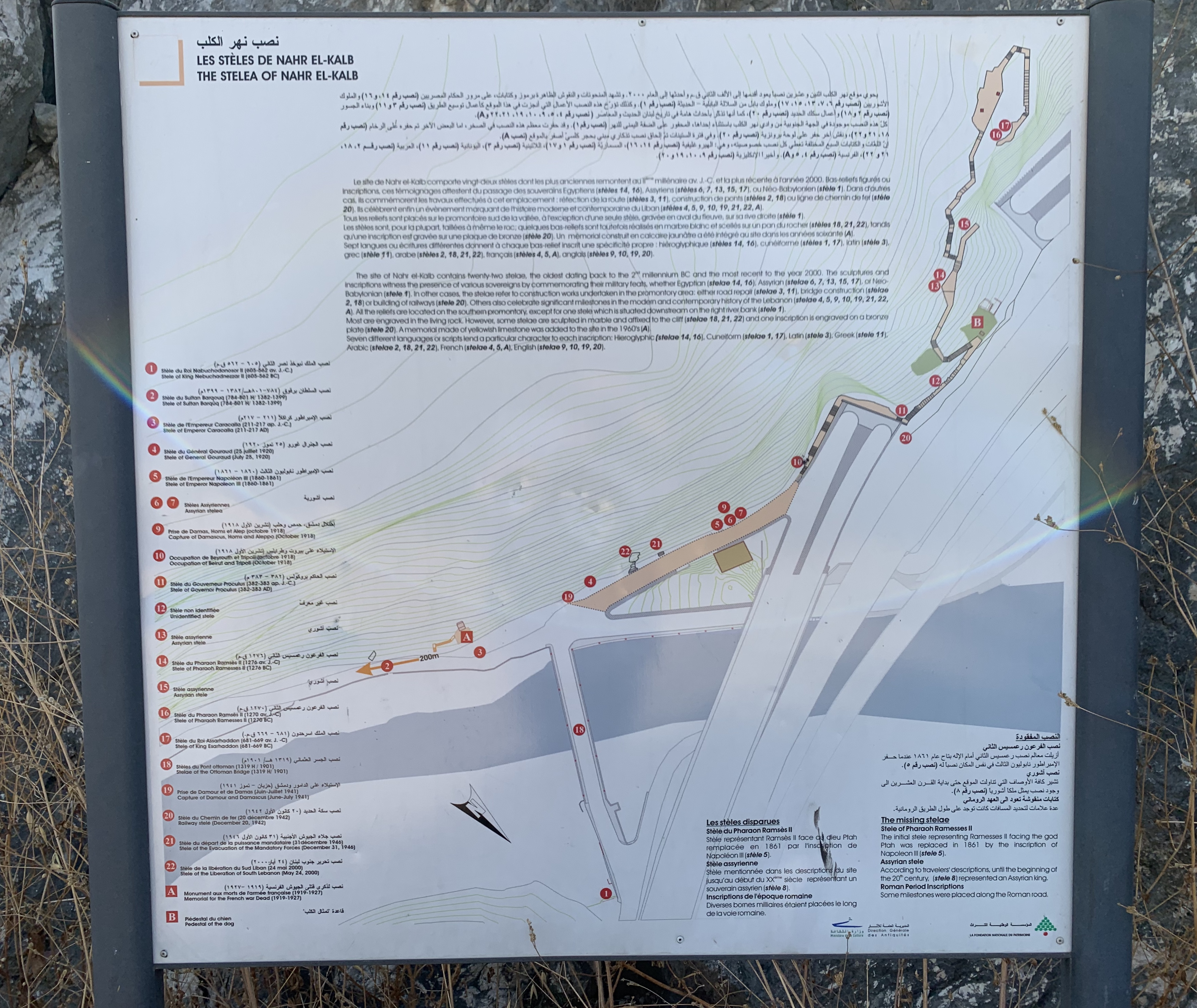
Top row: The area of the inscriptions, with the highway tunnel and the entrance road
Bottom row: Tourist signs describing the area, with the Zouk Mosbeh statue of Christ the King

Scholars such as Edward Robinson connected the Ramses II inscriptions to Sesostris, the Egyptian Pharaoh mentioned by Herodotus, in reference to Herodotus's note that "The pillars which Sesostris of Egypt set up in the various countries are for the most part no longer to be seen extant; but in Syria Palestine I myself saw them existing with the inscription upon them which I have mentioned and the emblem."

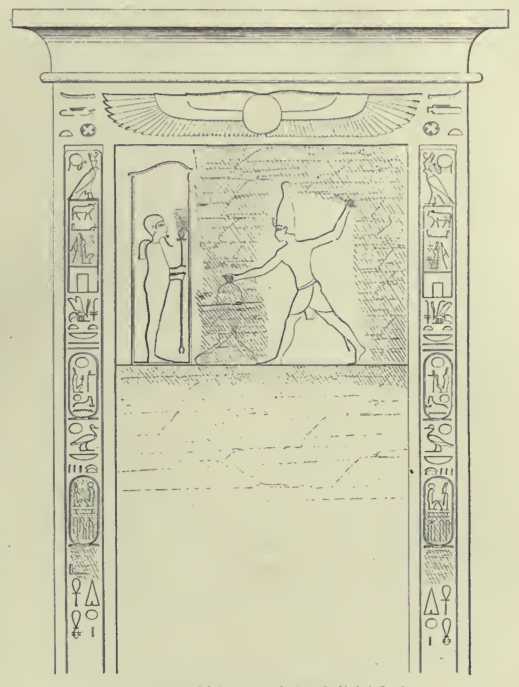
Nahr al-Kalb Northern Egyptian inscription drawing as of 1845

Currently, only two Egyptian hieroglyphic inscriptions remain; the third (shown on the left) was remodified by Napoleon III when he visited the site, with the original text wiped out and written over in French. The two other inscriptions, however, are so damaged that only the outlines of Ramesses II smiting an unknown enemy, presumably a Hittite, can be seen, along with an Egyptian god standing beside him. In one stelae, a god with a round disk on his head, Horus, stands next to Ramesses II and in the other stelae, Amun-Re stands beside Ramesses II.

The inscriptions written from top to bottom on both the left and right side of the stelae in the image on the right are exact copies of each other, with both being translated as follows:

ḥr.w kꜢ-nḫt mri.y Mꜣꜥ.t

Horus Name: The Strong Bull, Beloved of Maat,

nsw.bꞽ.ty nb tꜣ.wy Wsr-Mꜣꜥt-Rꜥ.w stp n(.y) Rꜥ.w

King of Upper and Lower Egypt, Lord of the Two Lands, User-maat-re (Ramesses II), chosen of Ra,

sꜣ Rꜥ.w nb ḫꜥ.w Rꜥ.w-msꞽ-s mrꞽ.y Ꞽmn.w ḏꞽ ꜥnḫ mꞽ Rꜥ.w

Son of Ra, Lord of Appearances: Ramesses II Mery Amun (Beloved of Amun), given life like Ra.

=== Assyrian and Babylonian inscriptions ===
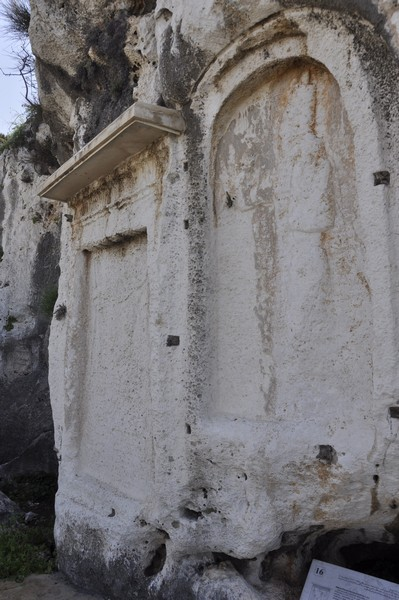
Nahr al-Kalb inscriptions of Ramesses II and Esarhaddon.

Six cuneiform Neo-Assyrian and Neo-Babylonian inscriptions are known. The Esarhaddon stele refers to Esarhaddon's seizure of Memphis from Egyptian Pharaoh Taharqa in 671 BC. The passage is badly damaged, but is understood to include reference to the cities of Ashkelon and Tyre, as well as Taharqa and 22 vassal kings. One inscription is attributed to Nebuchadnezzar II.

A plaster cast of one of the Assyrian inscriptions became the first relic of the ancient Assyrian empire to be brought to the United Kingdom, having been prepared by Joseph Bonomi the Younger in 1834.

=== Classical antiquity inscriptions ===
A number of Greco-Roman inscriptions were carved at the site.

The most significant of these is attributed to the Legio III Gallica of Roman Emperor Caracalla (211–217 AD), who was of Punic and Syrian descent and whose official name was "Marcus Aurelius Septimius Bassianus Antoninus". The inscription is related to the road his forces built at the site. The inscription includes the words "Lyco Flumen", which provided scholars such as Edward Robinson to conclude that the Nahr el-Kalb was the ancient Lycus river.

Two of the inscriptions are in Greek, one of which still can be read as commemorating road or engineering work left by Proclus, Byzantine governor of Phoenicia in 382 AD in the 4th century in Lebanon under Theodosius I (379–395 AD).

Marcus' cousin, Roman emperor Septimius Severus, also left some Latin inscriptions describing the great glories of his infantry.

=== Islamic inscriptions ===
Two Arabic inscriptions are known.

The earliest was dedicated to the Mamluk sultan Barquq (1382–1399).

An inscription dedicated to Emir of Lebanon Fakhr-al-Din II (1572–1635) was noted by Henry Maundrell in 1697, but by the 19th century this inscription was no longer legible.

=== Colonial inscriptions ===
The first colonial memorial is dedicated to Napoleon III's 1860–61 intervention in Lebanon.

Two inscriptions (1919 and 1930) mark the Pursuit to Haritan, when the Allied forces took Damascus, Homs and Aleppo in October 1918 towards the end of World War I. The first inscription is dedicated to Harry Chauvel's Desert Mounted Corps, and the second to the Australian, New Zealand, Indian, and French contingents, as well as the Sharifian Army of Hussein bin Ali, Sharif of Mecca.

In October 1918, an inscription was carved to mark the British and French occupation of Beirut and Tripoli, during the Occupied Enemy Territory Administration.

The next inscription was left by French troops under General Gouraud, of the French Fourth Army, who took Damascus in July 1920 in the Battle of Maysalun. General Gouraud proclaimed the establishment of the State of Greater Lebanon on 1 September 1920.

In 1942, the Allied forces "cut in the face of the cliff an inscription commemorating the freeing of Syria and the Lebanons" from Vichy France.

=== Lebanese inscription ===
In 1946, a monument was erected in celebration of the independence of Lebanon from France, which came in 1943.

In 2000, Lebanese demonstrators, including supporters of ex-general and current politician Emile Lahoud, erected a monument to mark the departure of Israeli troops from Lebanon.

== UNESCO Memory of the World ==
In 2005, the stelae were accepted by UNESCO into the Memory of the World international register. The application stated that the stelae "sum up the entire history of Lebanon, from High Antiquity to the present, evoking clearly the successive advances of the Pharaonic, Assyro-Babylonian, Greek, Roman, Arab, French and British armies which braved all the obstacles surrounding this difficult and very steep crossing point to carve commemorative stelae on the rocks."

During the 2024 Israeli invasion of Lebanon, UNESCO gave enhanced protection to 34 cultural sites in Lebanon including the Nahr el-Kalb archaeological site to safeguard it from damage.

== Gallery ==
Egyptian, Assyrian and Babylonian
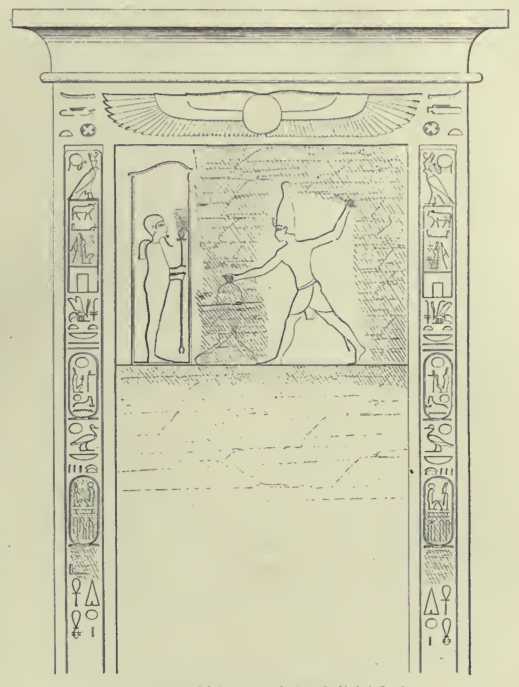
Northern Egyptian (1845)

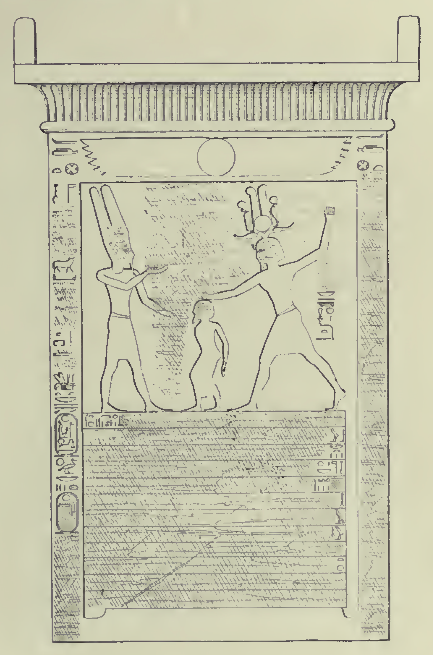
Southern Egyptian (1845)

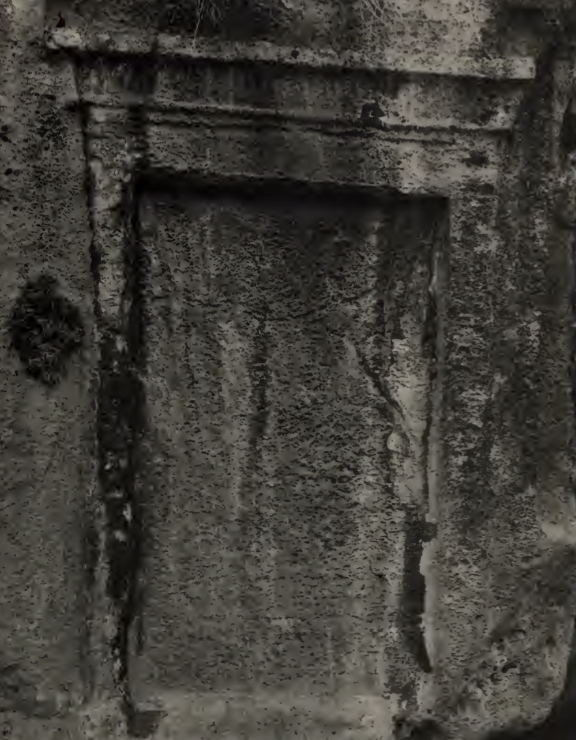
Southern Egyptian (1922)

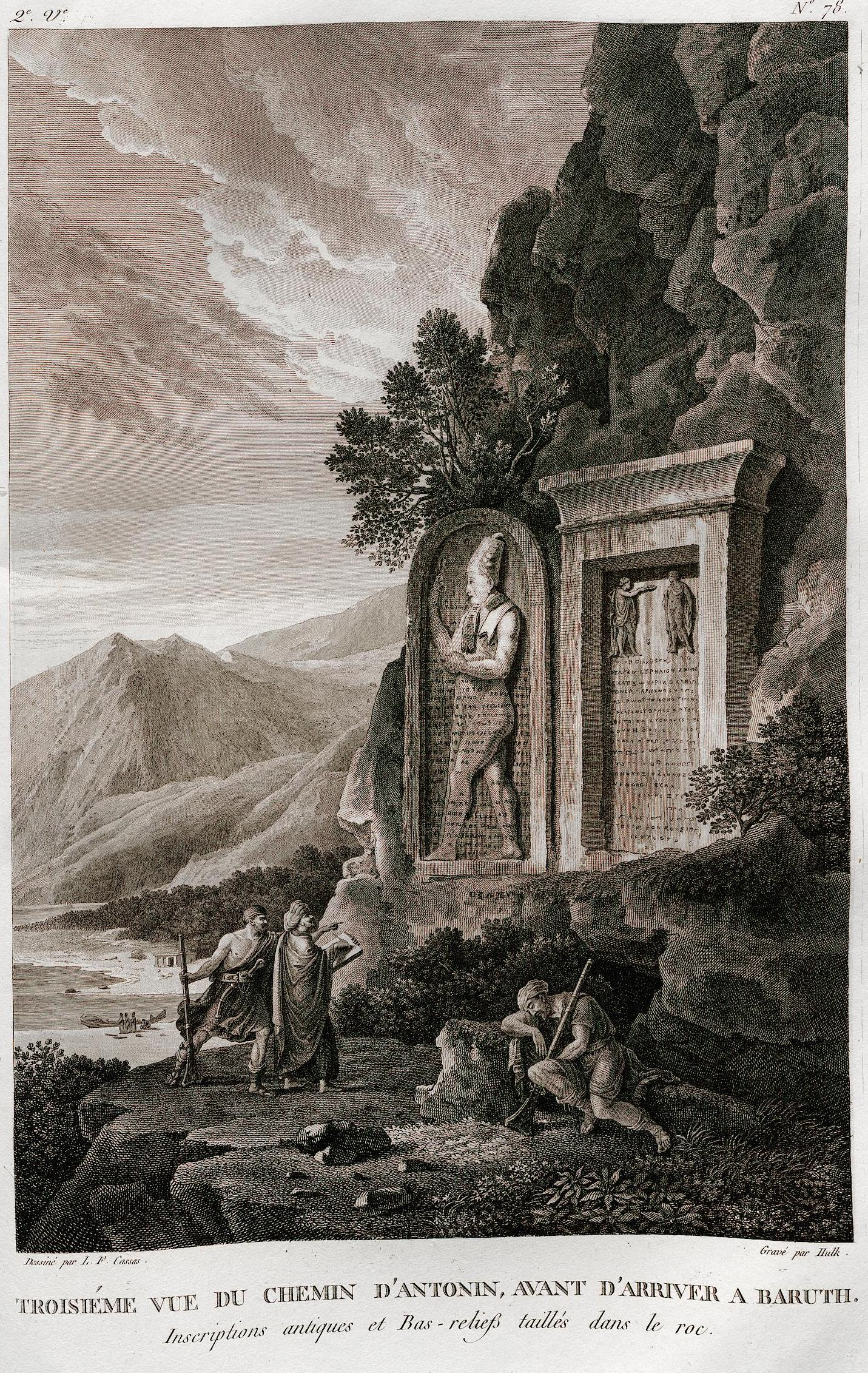
Middle Egyptian and Fourth Assyrian (1780s)

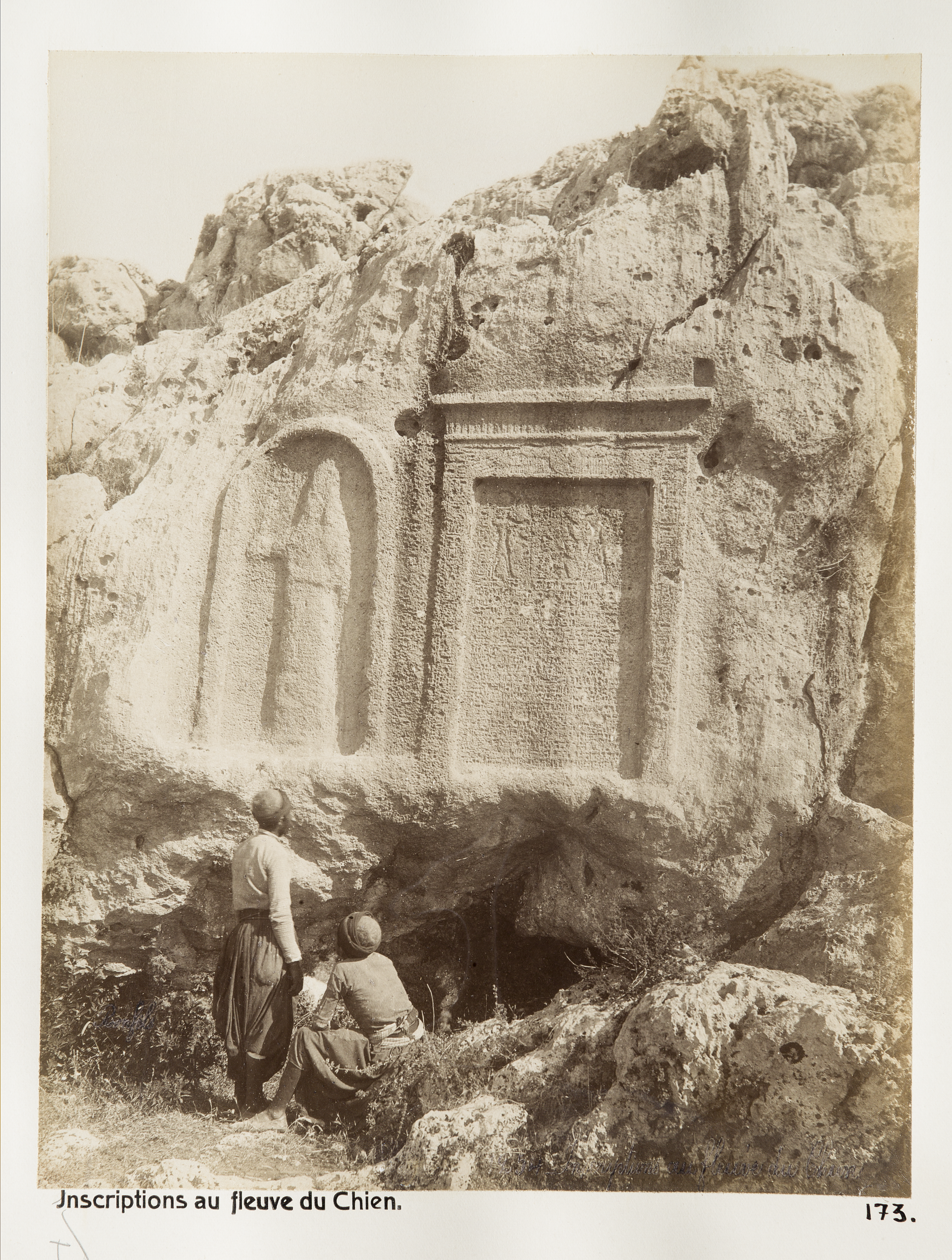
Middle Egyptian and Fourth Assyrian (c.1880)

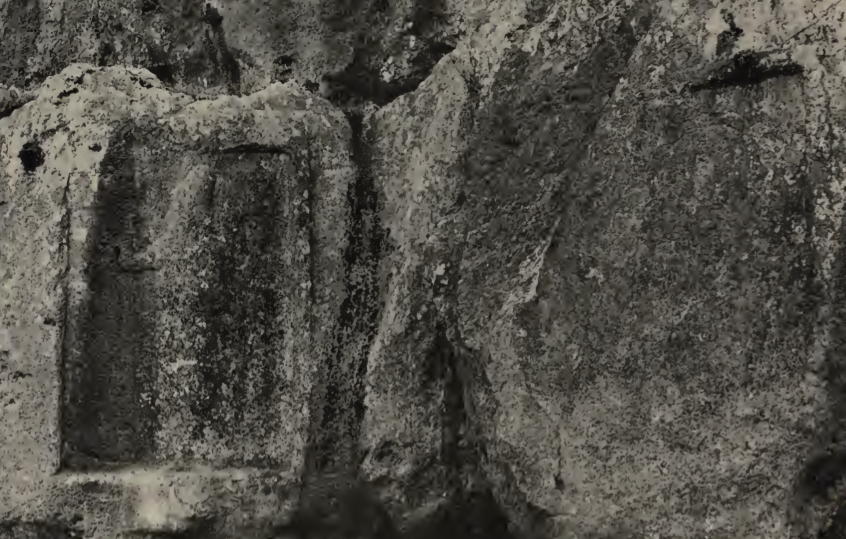
First and Second Assyrian (1922)

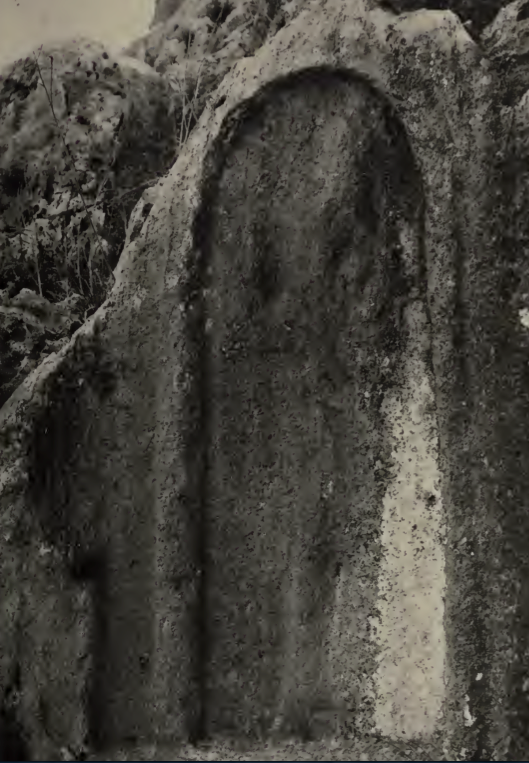
Third Assyrian (1922)

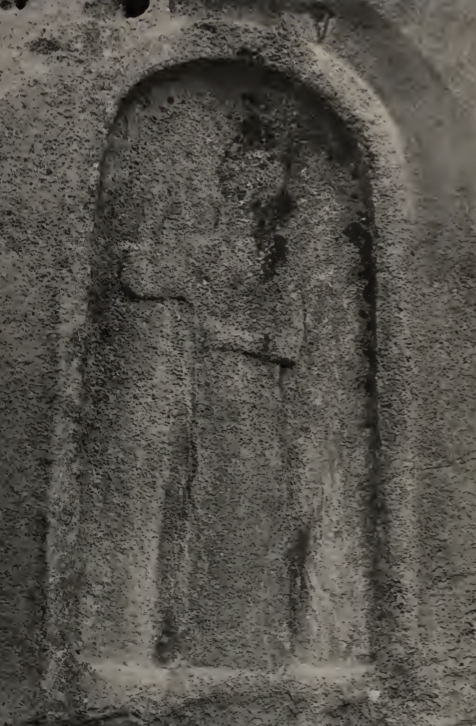
Fifth Assyrian (1922)

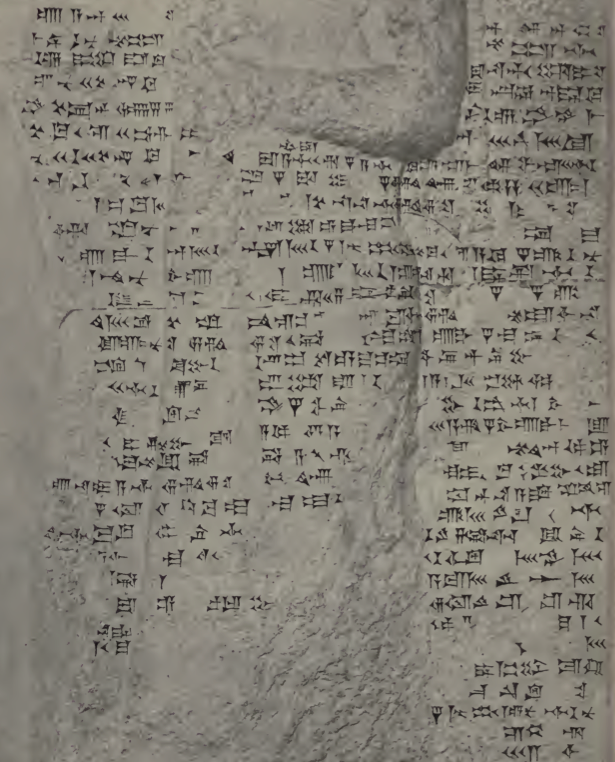
Sixth Assyrian (1922)

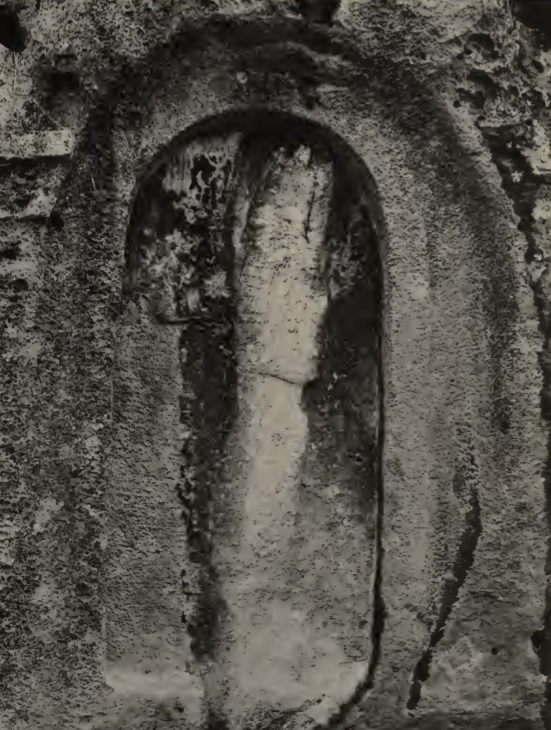
Sixth Assyrian (1922)

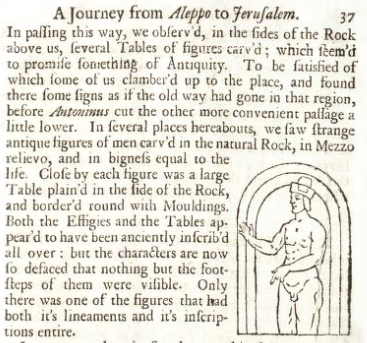
Maundrell's depiction of the Assyrian stelae (1697)
Roman and Islamic
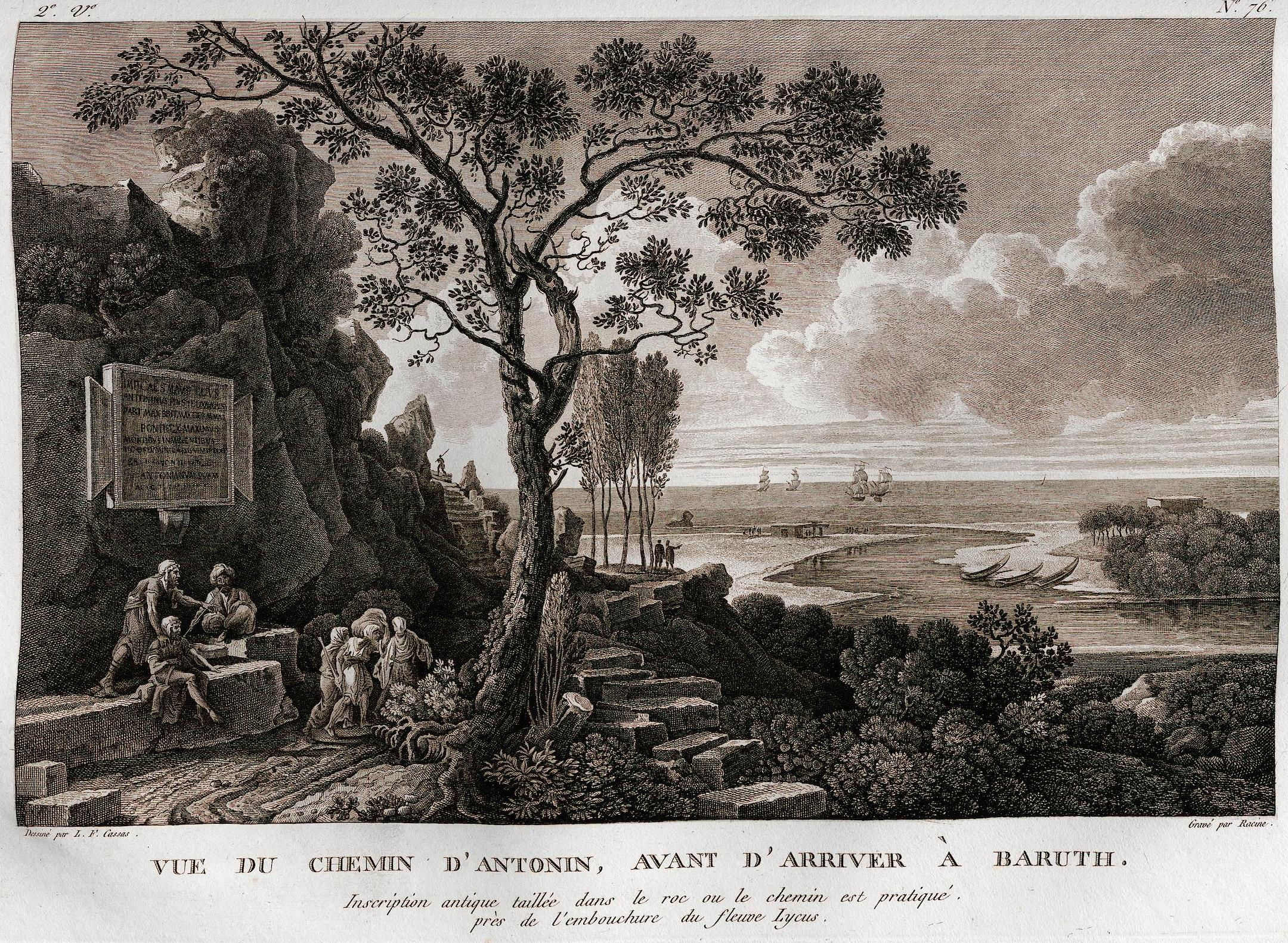
Roman (1780s)

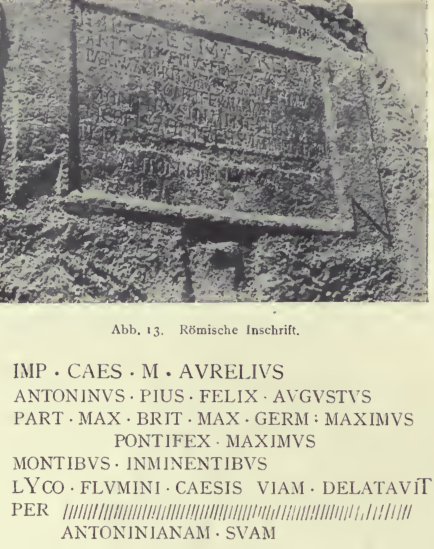
Roman (1922)

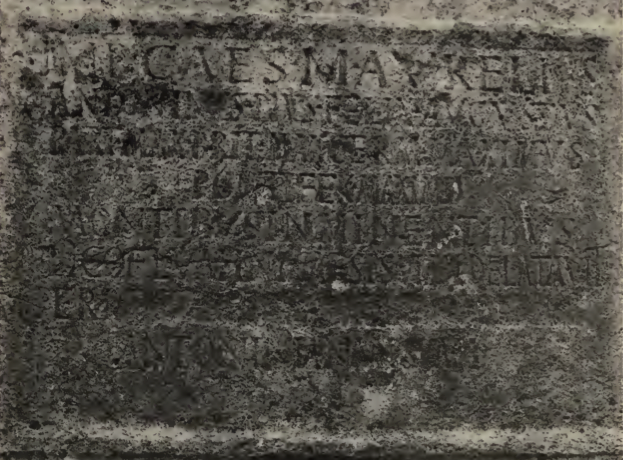
Roman (1922)

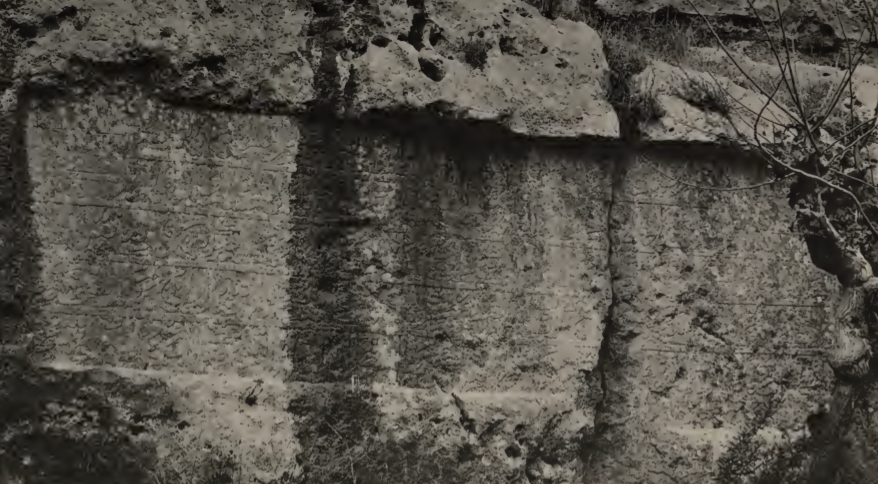
Barquq (1922)
Colonial and Lebanese
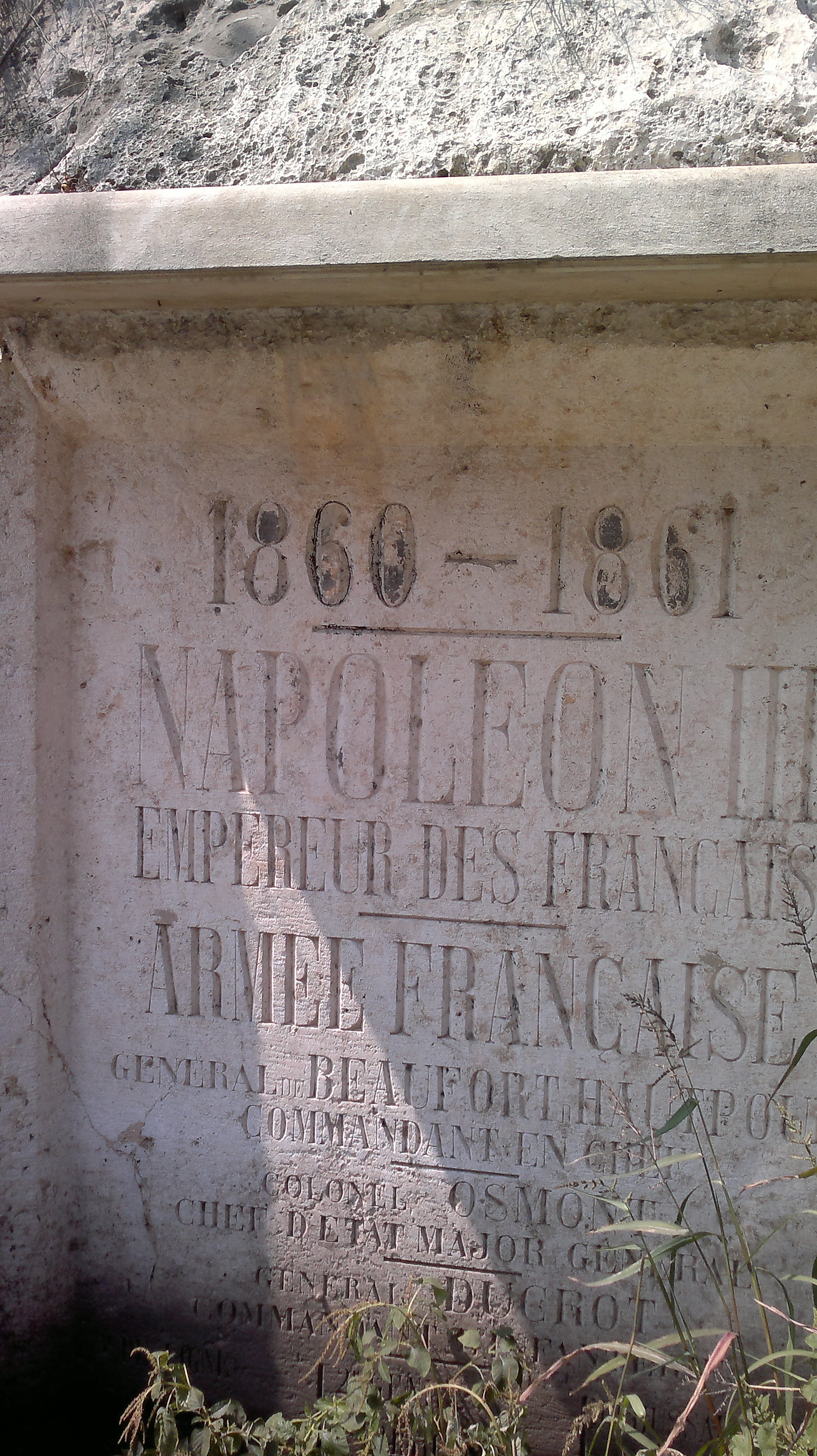
Napoleon III

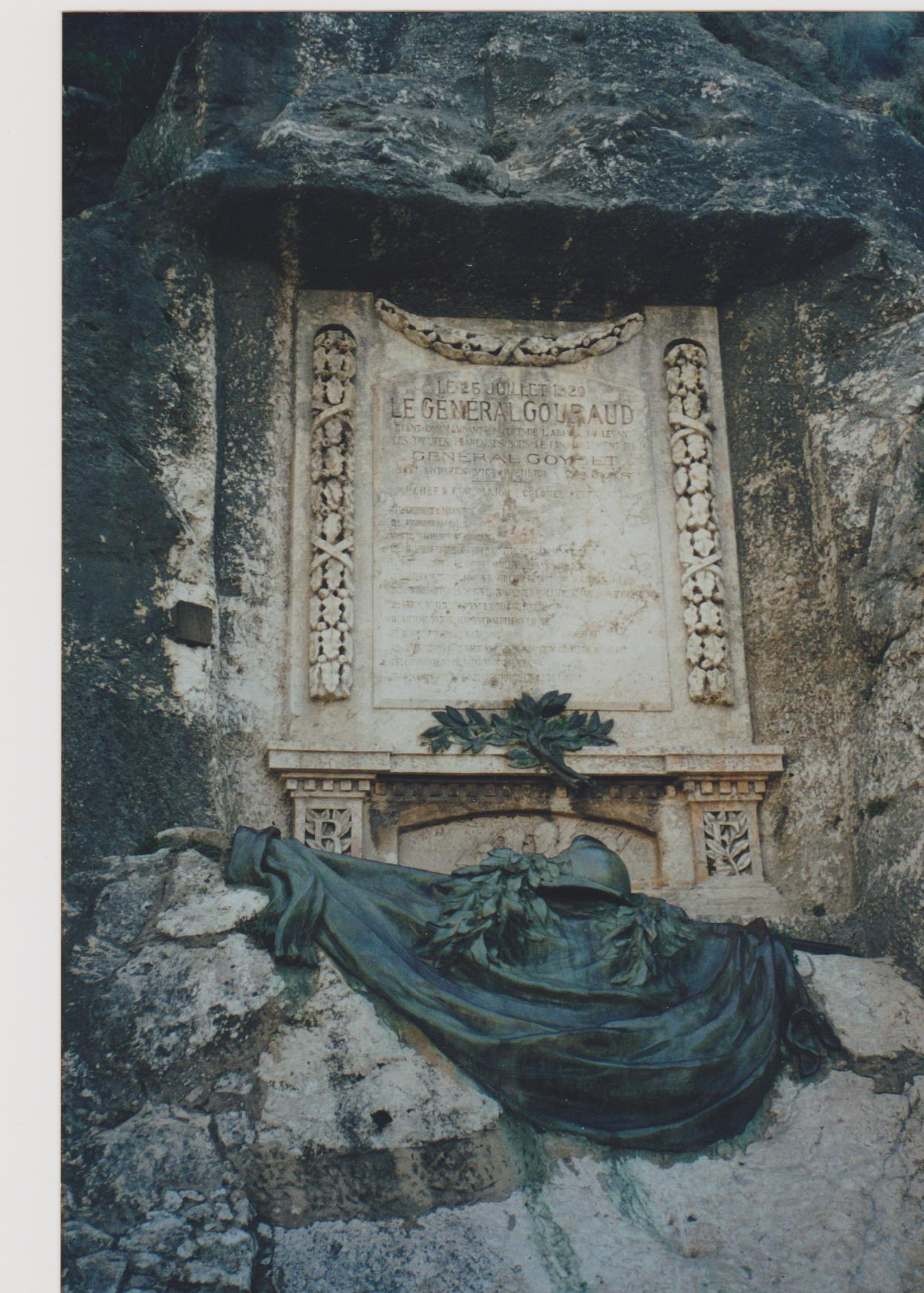
General Gouraud

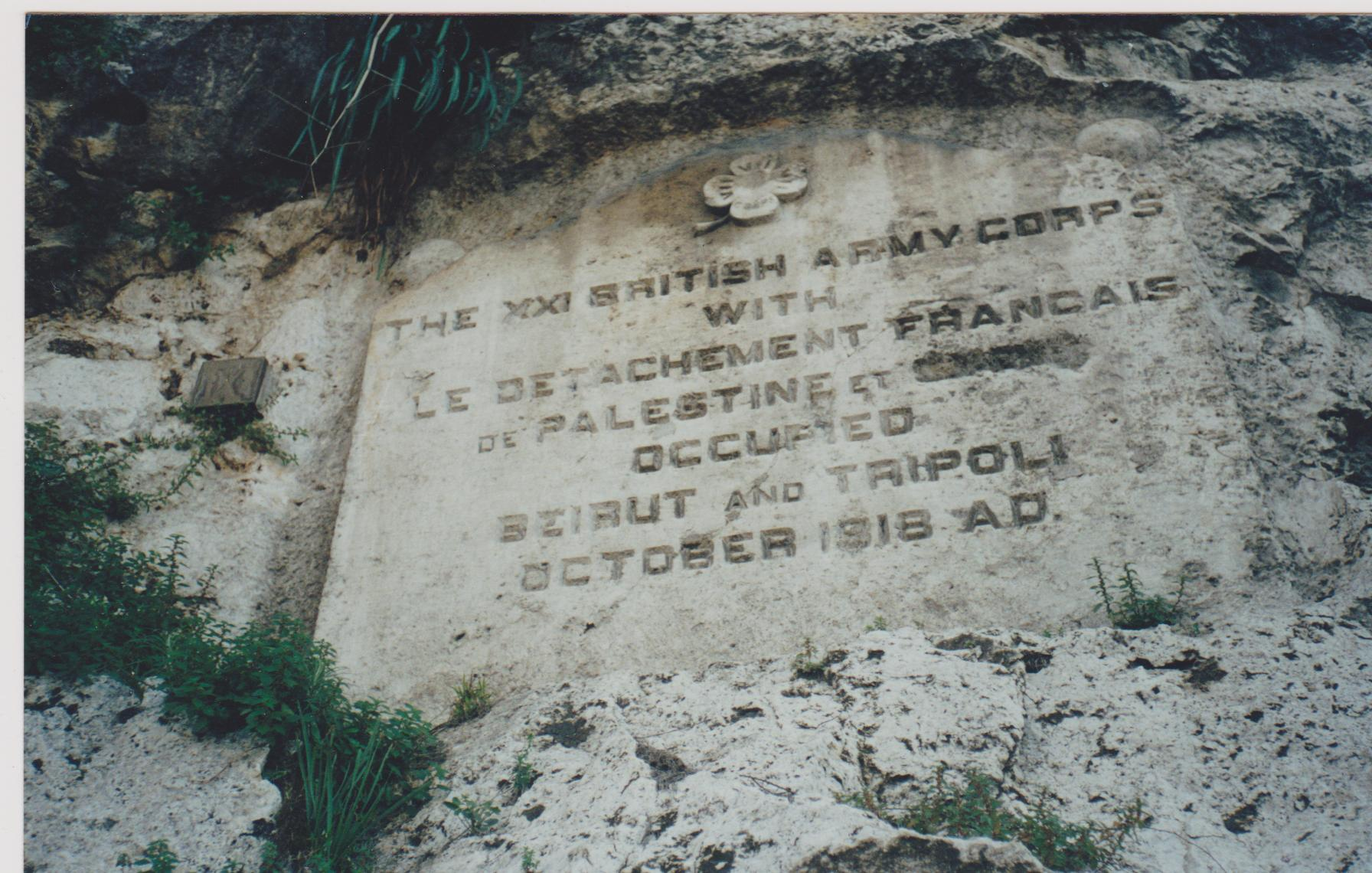
British troops capture Beirut and Tripoli (1918)

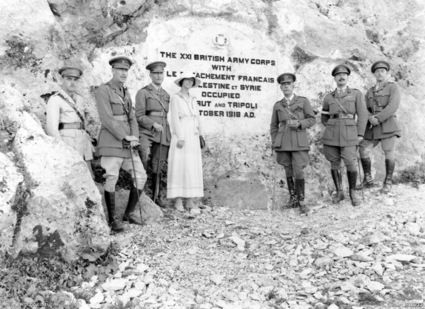
Harry Chauvel (1918)

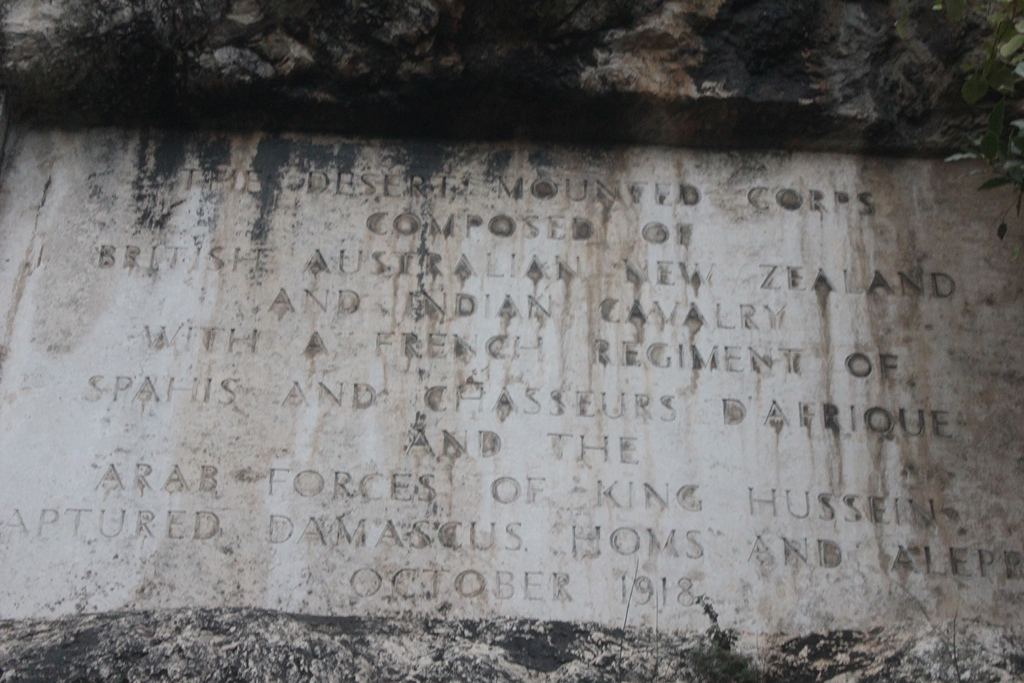
Capture of Damascus, Homs and Aleppo (1918)

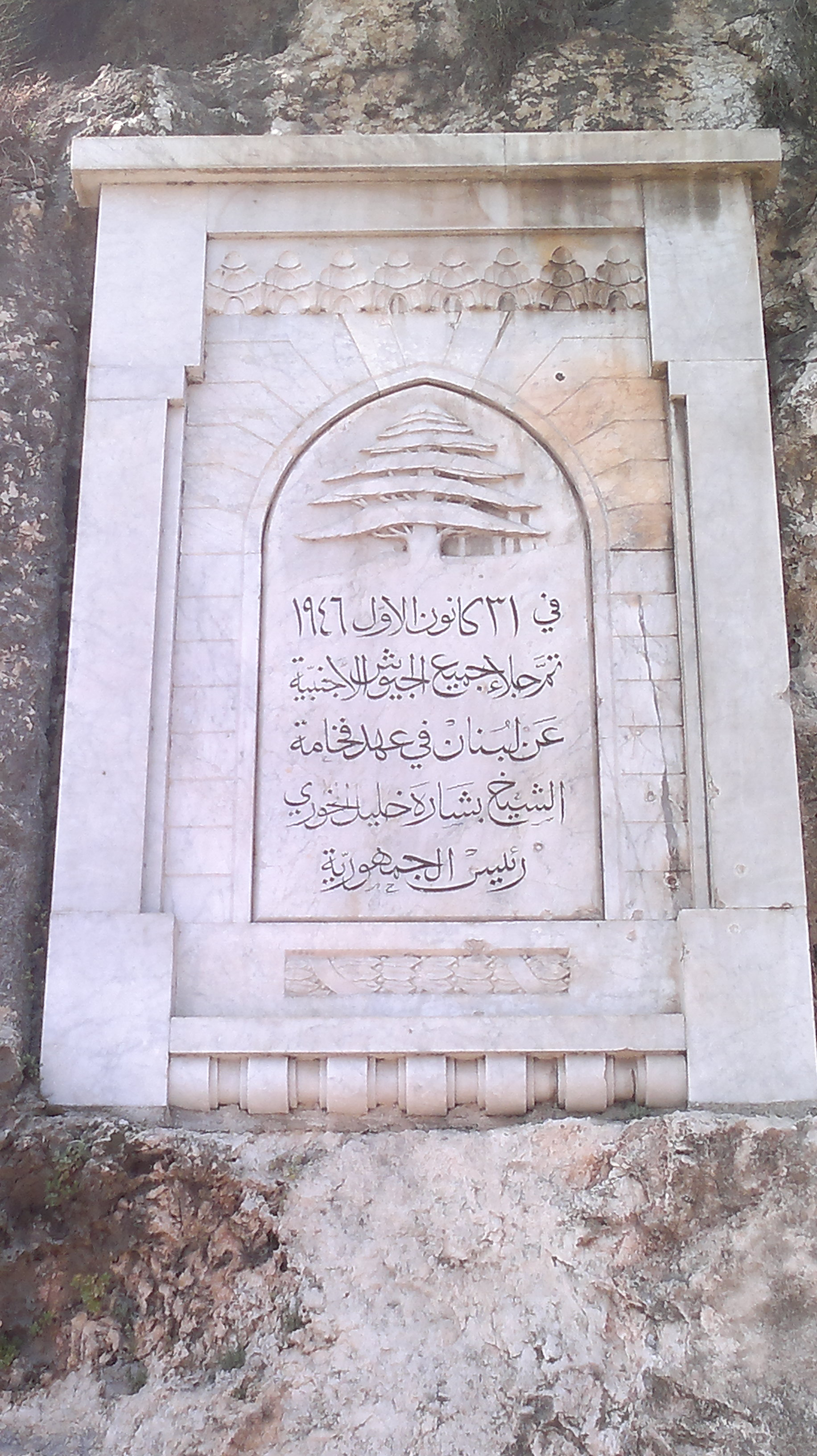
Bechara El Khoury, Lebanese independence (1946)

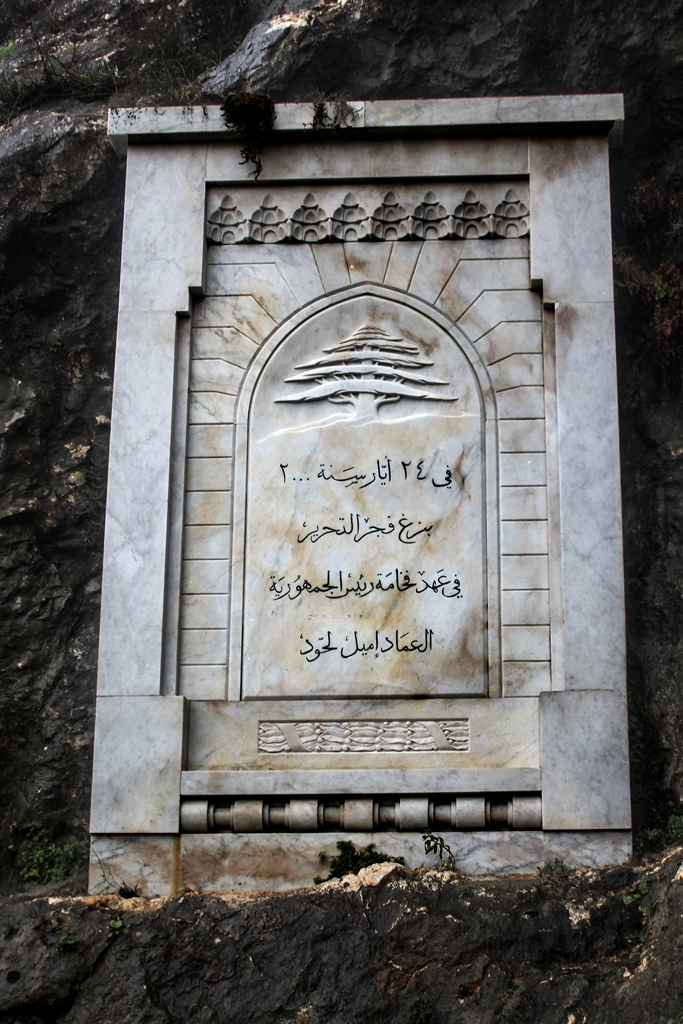
Departure of Israeli troops from Lebanon (2000)

== See also ==
- Egyptian Stelae in the Levant
- Aadloun stele
