= Aadloun =

Aadloun عدلون
- Municipality
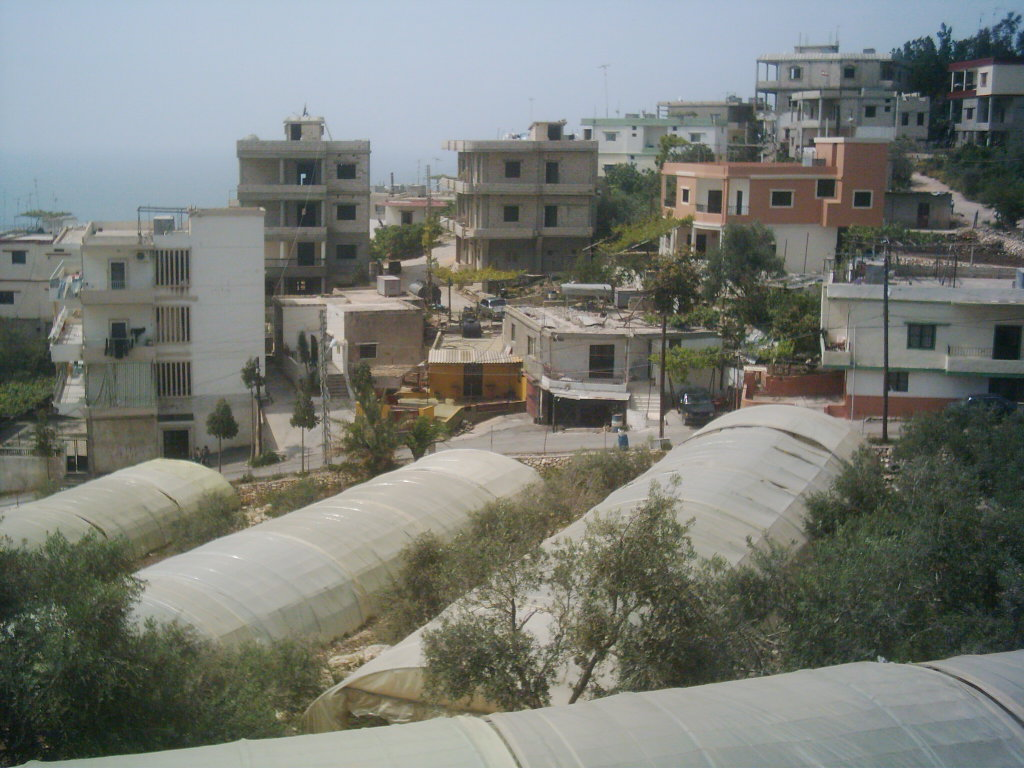

- Location in Lebanon
- Coordinates: 33°24′14″N 35°16′26″E
- Country: Lebanon
- Governorate: South Governorate
- District: Sidon District
- Elevation: 330 ft (100 m)
- Time zone: UTC+2 (EET)
  - Summer (DST): UTC+3 (EEST)

Aadloun I, II, III & IV
- Abri Zumoffen (Aadloun I), Bezez Cave, Mugharet el Bzaz (Aadloun II)
- Interactive map of Aadloun I, II, III & IV
- Periods: Early Yabrudian (Acheulio-Yabrudian), Levalloiso-Mousterian, Upper Paleolithic, Heavy Neolithic
- Cultures: Paleolithic, Neolithic, Phoenician

Site notes
- Excavation dates: 1898, 1900, 1908, 1958, 1963
- Archaeologists: Godefroy Zumoffen, Dorothy Garrod, Diana Kirkbride
- Condition: Ruins
- Management: Directorate General of Antiquities
- Public access: No

Aadloun, Adloun or Adlun (Arabic: عدلون, romanized: ʿAdlūn) is a coastal municipality in South Lebanon, 17 kilometres (11 mi) south of Sidon famous for its cultivation of watermelons. It is also the site of a Phoenician necropolis and prehistoric caves where four archaeological sites have been discovered and dated to the Stone Age. The evidence of human occupation of Abri Zumoffen (or Aadloun I) has been dated as far back as 71,000 BCE with occupation of Bezez Cave (Aadloun II) dating back even further into the earlier Middle Paleolithic.

== Prehistoric sites ==
=== Aadloun I ===
Aadloun I or Abri Zumoffen is a low cave and terrace at the foot of a cliff near a beach. It was discovered and sounded by Godefroy Zumoffen in 1898, 1900 and 1908 who found material thought to be either Acheulean or Mousterian. Dorothy Garrod suggested similarities existed to a final Acheulean (or Yabrudian) industry of Tabun E. Along with Diana Kirkbride, she re-opened excavations in 1958 with another season in 1963 and found a pre-Aurignacian (Garrod's Amudian) blade industry in the deposits. D. A. Hooijer discussed the fauna of the site suggesting it included game animals and rhino. Materials from the site are now in collections of the Saint Joseph University, Beirut and the Museum of Archaeology and Anthropology, University of Cambridge, Cambridge. The site is now owned by the Directorate General of Antiquities but the previous land owner carried out private digging that has spread deposits from the Aadloun II cave site over the area creating a false layer.

=== Aadloun II ===
Aadloun II, Bezez Cave or Mugharet el Bzaz is a cave on the east of the road heading to Tyre set into a cliff at an altitude of approximately 17 metres (56 ft) above sea level. It was first sounded with little result in 1898 by Godefroy Zumoffen. A major excavation was undertaken in 1963 by Diana Kirkbride and Dorothy Garrod who determined a sequence stretching through the Yabrudian, Levalloiso-Mousterian, Upper Paleolithic and on into the Heavy Neolithic. Materials from the excavations were to be held by Saint Joseph University and the American University of Beirut. The site is owned by the Directorate General of Antiquities and a gate was fixed over the mouth of the cave for protection. Three distinct levels were determined. Level C was called Acheuleo-Yabrudian with materials found that resembled level E at Tabun Cave. Level B was called Levalloiso-Mousterian and compared with level D of Tabun. Level C encompassed the Upper Paleolithic and onwards.

=== Aadloun III ===
Aadloun III is a site approximately 1 kilometre (0.6 mi) south of Aadloun with a Chalcolithic (Enéolithique) industry that was found by P. E. Gigues.

=== Aadloun IV ===
Aadloun IV was found by P. E. Gigues on the terraces below the village near the caves that have been damaged by quarrying. Local farmers have recovered several fine Neolithic and Chalcolithic tools from this area that are held by Saint Joseph University. Dr. Gigues collection was held in Beirut by a relative who charged a fee for showing it after his retirement to Morocco.

=== Materials recovered ===
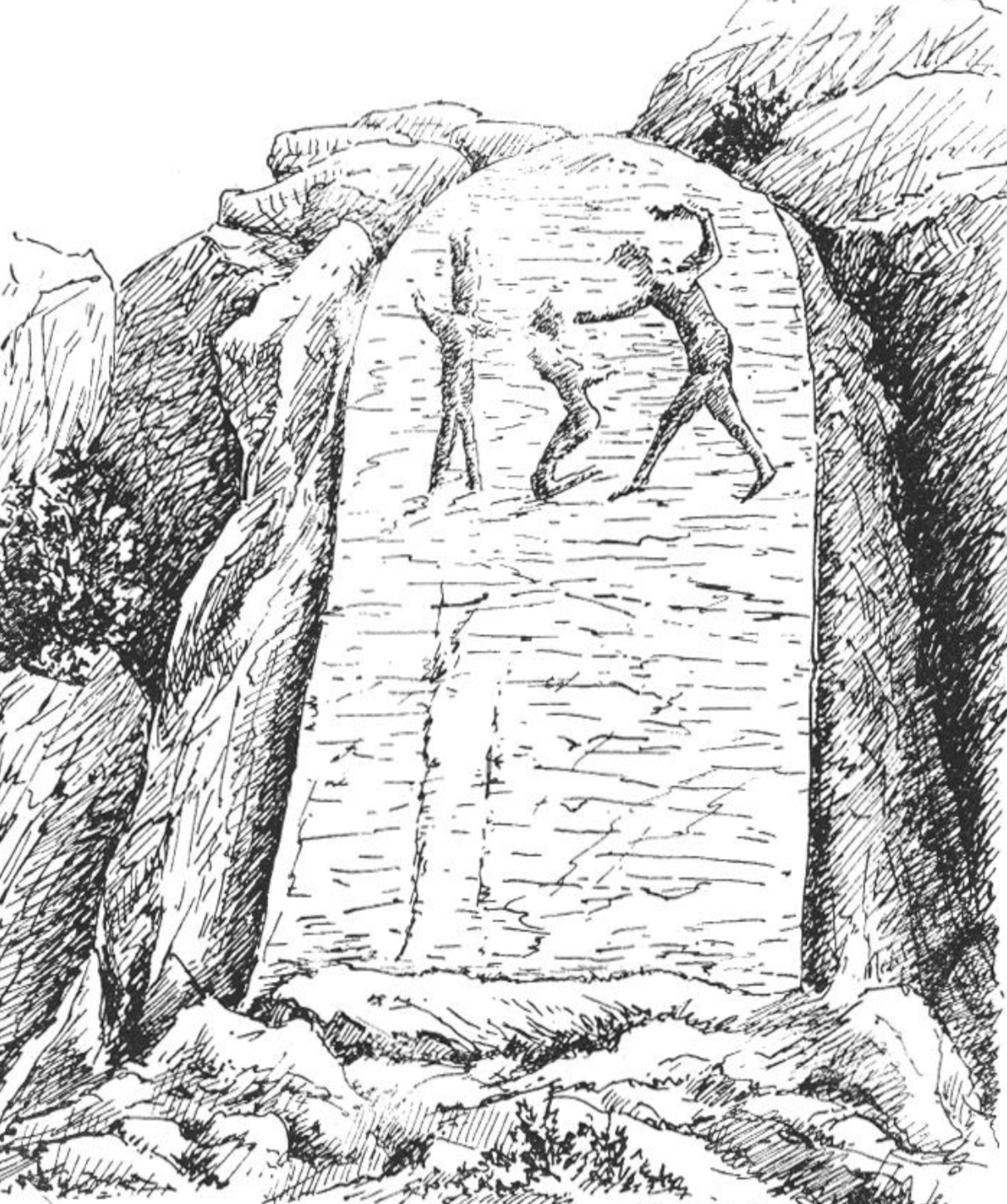
The Aadloun stele in 1843

Lorraine Copeland made a collection of mostly Heavy Neolithic flints from the site in 1966. Amongst the finds were massive trapezoidal axes, chisels, a chopper, points, a pick, rough scrapers, blades, cores and hammerstones. The finds led Andrew Moore to suggest that Bezez cave was a factory site for such tools.

== Modern era ==
In 1875 Victor Guérin noted that Aadloun "consists of 350 inhabitants, all Muslims. Cisterns carved into the rock and many ashlars of ancient appearance seem to prove that it succeeded an older locality."

The Aadloun archaeological sites were amongst 34 cultural heritage properties given enhanced protection by UNESCO to safeguard them during the Israeli invasion of Lebanon in 2024.

== Demographics ==
In 2014, Muslims made up 99.72% of registered voters in Aadloun. 98.02% of the voters were Shiite Muslims.

== Notable people ==
- Hamza Ali Aboud, writer and poet
- Mohamed Zein Tahan, footballer

== Bibliography ==
- Guérin, V. (1880). Description Géographique Historique et Archéologique de la Palestine (in French). Vol. 3: Galilee, pt. 2. Paris: L'Imprimerie Nationale.
