= Beisan steles =

Egyptian steles found in Mandatory Palestine

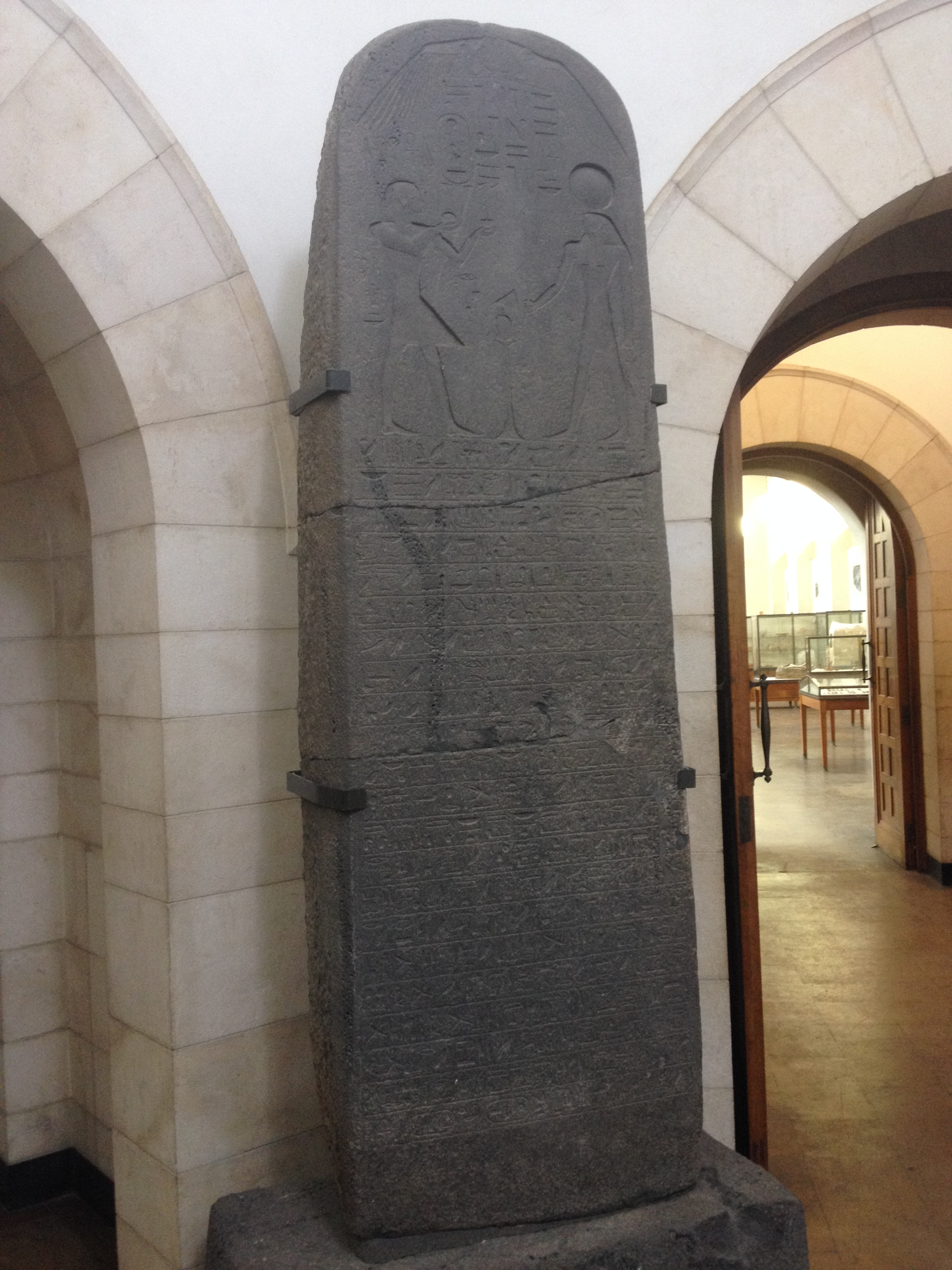
"First stele" of Seti I, Rockefeller Archeological Museum

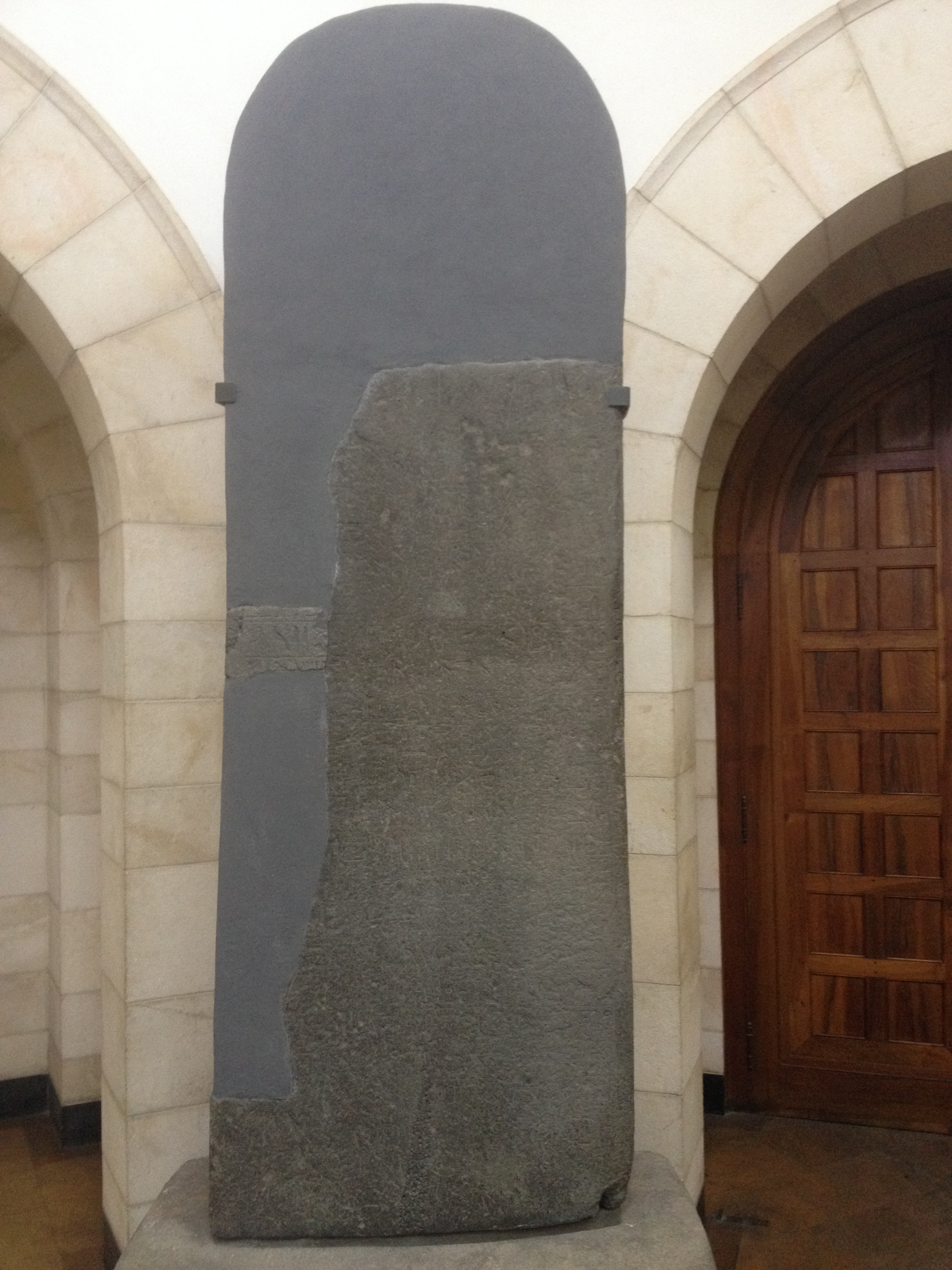
"Second stele, of Seti I, Rockefeller Archeological Museum

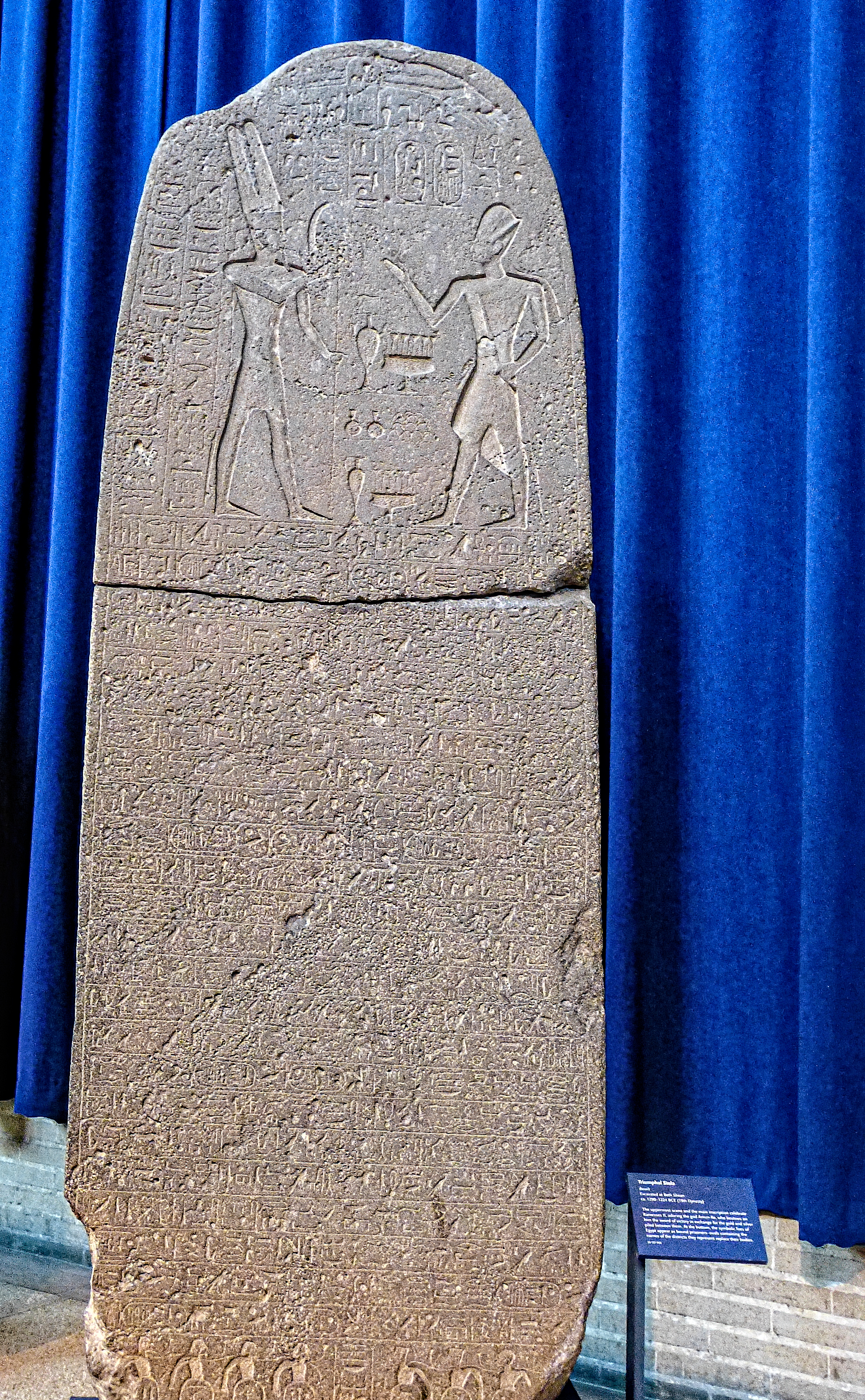
Ramesses II stele, Penn Museum

The three triumphal steles

The Beisan steles are five Ancient Egyptian steles from the period of Seti I (reigned c. 1294–1279 BC) and Ramesses II (reigned c. 1279–1213 BC) discovered in what was then known as Beisan, Mandatory Palestine by Alan Rowe in the late 1920s and early 1930s. (Note: A number of Stelae or Stele fragments derive from LB IIB-Iron IA Palestine. Five came from Beth Shan, four from Deir el-Balah, and two from sites on the east bank of the Jordan. All were made of local stone basalt, kurkar (sandstone), or limestone. Three of the Beth Shan Stelae contain lengthy inscriptions, which were discussed in chapter 2 in the sections on the reigns of Seti I.)

The first stele of Seti is considered to testify to the presence of a population of Hebrews: the Habiru, which Seti I protected from an Asiatic tribe.

== First stele and second stele ==
They are known as

- "First Stele": COS 2.4B (Note: Context of Scripture: First Beth-Shan Stela, Year 1 (2.4B) (Palestine Archaeological Museum, Jerusalem, S.884) "On his campaign in Year 1 (1294 or 1290 BCE), Sethos I probably penetrated as far as Phoenicia. Then on his return southward, he found disturbances in the Beth-Shan district, just south of the Sea of Galilee. The local chiefs of Hammath and Pella (W and E of the Jordan) had blockaded nearby Rehob and seized the important center of Beth-Shan. So the pharaoh sent out three strike-forces: against rebel Hammath, the captured Beth-Shan, and neighboring Yenoam. Beth-Shan is Tell Husn (at modern Beisan), where this stela was found.") / ANET 253–254 (A Campaign of Seti I in Northern Palestine)
- "Second Stele": COS 2.4D (Note: Context of Scripture: Second Beth-Shan Stella, [Year Lost] (2.4D) (Palestine Archaeological Museum, Jerusalem, S.885A/B) "Regrettably, the year-date is broken away on this monument, but is likely to have been [Year 2 or later]. Again, on his way back south, the king was obliged to quell dissidents, seemingly in Lower Galilee, as his troops 'turned back' to deal with the matter. The Apiru are here given the determinative of an armed man; so they were regarded in this case as armed bands by the Egyptians.") A badly damaged and weathered stele / ANET 255 (Stelae of Seti I and Ramses II)
- Ramesses Stele: ANET 255 (Stelae of Seti I and Ramses II)

The First Stele of Seti I has been described as "the most impressive find from Egypt’s rule over Canaan". (Note: One stele discovered from Seti i is called the “Large Stele” and is considered the most impressive find from Egypt’s rule over Canaan.)

The first stele is considered to testify to the presence of a Hebrew population: the Habiru, which Seti I protected from an Asiatic tribe. (Note: The stela of Seti I discovered at Beisan indicates that the Apiru or Hebrews were certainly in the neighbourhood at that time, c. 1300 B.C. and they seem to have come from the East of Jordan. This is not absolutely certain because the words on the stela are partly obliterated, but it would seem to be confirmed by the second stela of Seti I found at the same site, which distinctly refers to an invasion from the east side of Jordan.)

Today they are in the Penn Museum, Philadelphia, and the Rockefeller Archaeological Museum, Jerusalem.

== Other Egyptian / Canaanite steles ==
Two other important steles from the same period were found in the same area. Today these are both at the Israel Museum, Jerusalem.

=== Mekal Stele ===
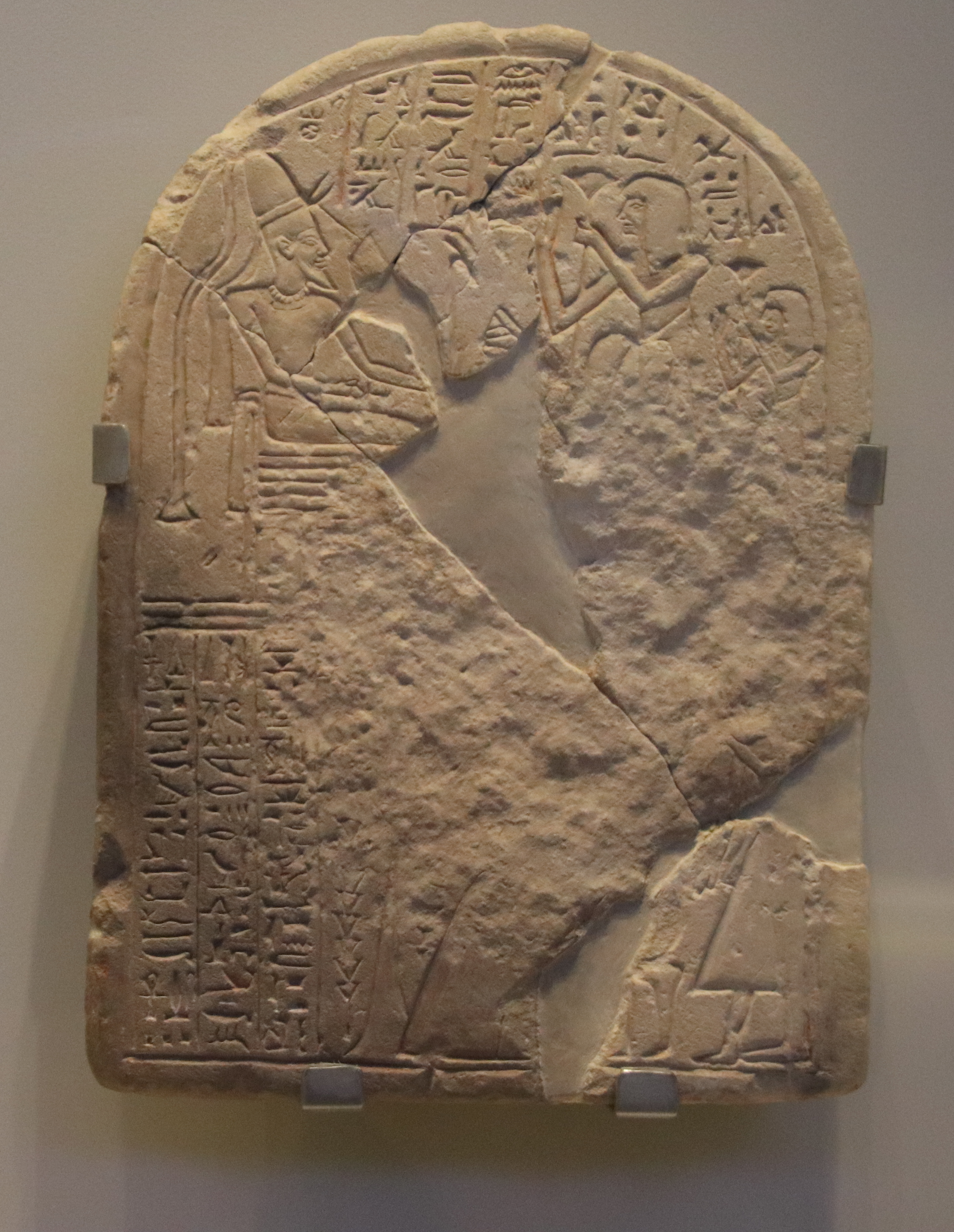
Limestone Stele of Canaanite God Mekal, 13th C. BCE

One of the steles, discovered in 1928, states that the temple was dedicated to “Mekal, the god, the lord of Beth Shean”; an otherwise unknown Canaanite god – the stele itself is our main source of knowledge about Mekal.

Mekal is seated on a throne, receiving lotus flowers from the builder Amenemapt and his son Paraemheb, holding an ankh and was-sceptre.

=== Lion Stele ===
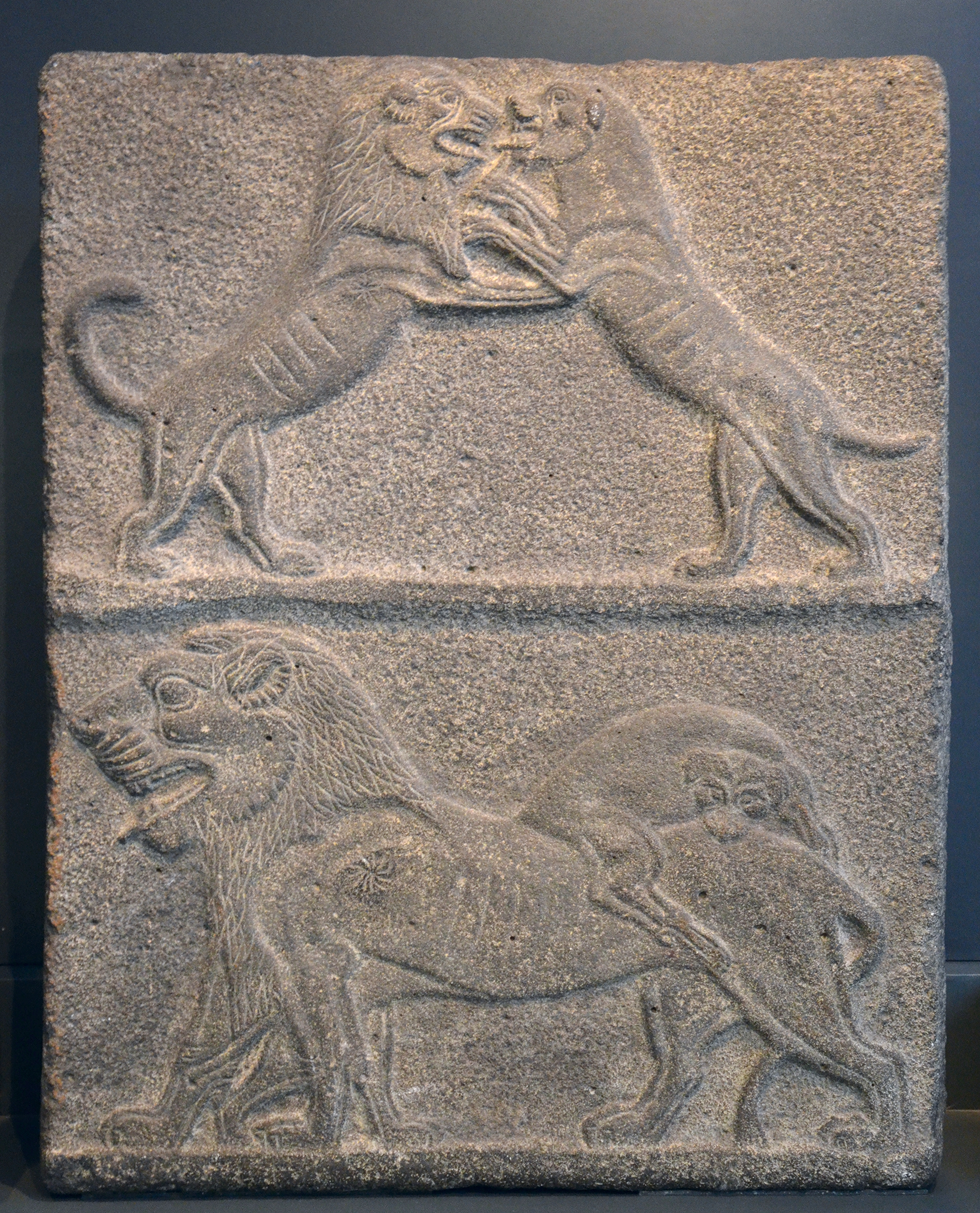
Canaanite relief in basalt depicting either a lion and a dog or a lion and a lioness at play, 14th century BCE

A Canaanite stele showing a lion and a second animal was found in Rowe's 1928 excavation, south of the building he called "Makel's Temple". Rowe interpreted the scenes depicted as the temple's guarding dog fighting a lion, possibly Nergal the Babylonian god of death. Others thought it is more likely to be a courting scene between a lion and a lioness at play.

== See also ==
- Egyptian Stelae in the Levant
- List of inscriptions in biblical archaeology
