= Henry Maundrell =

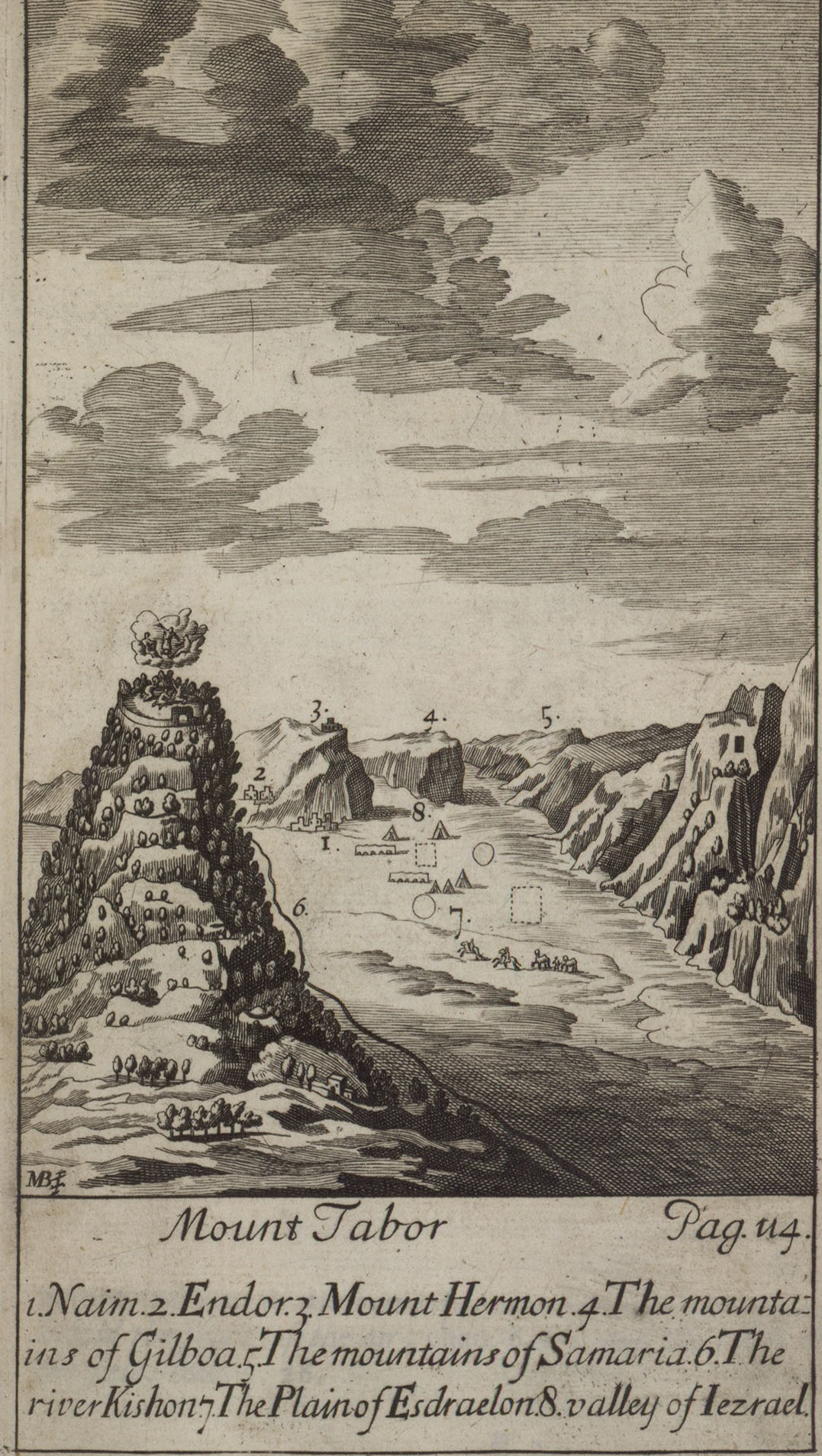
Mount Tabor, from Maundrell's book A Journey from Aleppo to Jerusalem at Easter AD 1697

Henry Maundrell (1665–1701) was an academic at Oxford University and later a Church of England clergyman, who served from 20 December 1695 as chaplain to the Levant Company in Syria. His Journey from Aleppo to Jerusalem at Easter A.D. 1697 (Oxford, 1703), which had its origins in the diary he carried with him on his Easter pilgrimage to Jerusalem in 1697, has become an often reprinted "minor travel classic". It was included in compilations of travel accounts from the mid-18th century, and was translated into three additional languages: French (1705), Dutch (1717) and German (1792). By 1749, the seventh edition was printed.

== Life ==
Maundrell was born at Compton Bassett, near Calne, Wiltshire, in 1665. He attended Exeter College, Oxford, from 1682 and obtained his BA and then in 1688, his MA; at his graduation he was appointed a Fellow of the college, where he would remain until 1689. He accepted a curacy at Brompton, Kent, 1689–95, and was ordained priest by the Bishop of Rochester, Thomas Sprat, at Croydon, on 23 February 1691.

His uncle, Sir Charles Hedges, was a judge of Admiralty Court who later served as one of Queen Anne's Secretaries of State. Another uncle, Sir William Hedges, a director of the Bank of England, had directed the Levant Company's "factory" at Constantinople, an essential factor in Maundrell's appointment (1695), which paid him £100 p.a., with room and board in the Aleppo "factory" and perquisites. The Levant Company community at Aleppo consisted of only forty men, living in monastic seclusion: Maundrell wrote to Henry Osborne, "We live in separate squares, shut up at night after the manner of colleges. We begin the day constantly... with prayers, and have our set times for business, meals, and recreations" Like other Anglican clergy of his day, Maundrell made no attempt to understand Islam or to read Arabic. This was likely because he believed it was not true and not worth studying.

He left Aleppo in February 1697 in a company of fifteen men. Their circuit took them across Syria to Latakia, down the Syrian and Lebanese coasts as far as Acre, which they found in ruinous state save for a khan (caravanserai) occupied by some French merchants, a mosque and a few poor cottages. Thence they proceeded inland to Jerusalem, where they attended Latin rite Easter services at the Church of the Holy Sepulchre. They returned to Aleppo via Damascus, Baalbek and Tripoli; they arrived 18 May 1697. The descriptions constantly referred to relevant passages in the Bible, encounters with greedy local Ottoman officials at roadblocks and checkpoints demanding payment of caphar, and confirmed Maundrell in his distaste for the local inhabitants.

Maundrell was an observant reporter with a passion for precise detail:

It is concise in contents, plain and attractive in style, and precise in its natural exposition of facts, all of which make it interesting to read even to-day. When the diary, crammed with precise, factual information, began to circulate among his friends they quickly realised that here at last was one of the first factual accounts of the antiquities of the Middle East. Its impact was such that he was persuaded by his uncle and several of his acquaintances, to prepare it for publication.

—Mohamad Ali Hachicho in 1964

By the time it appeared, Maundrell, never in robust health, had died in Aleppo in 1701.

A further travel journal was published as A Journey to the Banks of the Euphrates at Beer, and to the Country of Mesopotamia (Oxford, 1699). It was appended to the Journey to Jerusalem in the 1714 edition.
