= Hamza Ali Aboud =

Lebanese writer and poet

- Born: 1946 (age 79–80); Aadloun
- Years active: 1978–present
- Notable work: I start from a walking number Talk too Like I am now

Hamza Ali Aboud (Arabic: حمزة علي عبود) (born 1946) is a Lebanese writer and poet for whom a number of books and poetry have been published, most notably I start from a walking number (1978), Speech as well (1982), as well as the two novels of Poet Bluesar Tales (1988), and the Cautious Calm novel (1999).

== Early life and education ==
Hamza Ali Aboud was born in 1946 in Aadloun, where he grew up. He studied in Tyre city, then he graduated from high school in Cairo, Egypt. He got a degree in Arabic literature from the Lebanese University in 1974.

== Career ==
Hamza Ali Aboud began his career in teaching and worked as a writer in a number of Lebanese newspapers as: Al-Safeer and Al-Nahar, in addition to that he wrote a number of articles in literary and cultural journals as: Mawaqef, Al-Tareeq, and in the Arab Research Center.

Hamza entered the world of writing early and specifically in 1978 when he released his poetic Diwan entitled I start from a number walking. Then he released his second poetic Diwan in 1982 entitled Speech too, before his third poetic Diwan A Shadow of the Tithe's Biography in 1991. After five years he published his fourth Diwan Like I am now, which achieved some success in terms of sales after Hamza became known locally (in Lebanon) and at the Arab level (especially in the Middle East).

Hamza started writing novels and especially long ones in 1988, when he published the novel Tales of the poet Bluezar, after 10 years he published Cautious calm in 1999, which is also a story collection. This story tells the tale of a people who look toward democracy and freedom, despite the long-standing alienation, it tells the story of a generation that lived days and nights between the sounds of guns, missiles, and airplanes, and with the blaze every morning, he says, the war is over, but this calm he feels is a cautious calm for shooting, not the end of it.

Some books were written about the Lebanese poet Hamza Ali Aboud, including the 1983 book by Nazih Khatar, entitled The beautiful, and what is written by another Lebanese writer, Ahmed Fahim, in 1983 under the title The Arab struggle, finally, Abbas Beyadoun's, The Ambassador, which includes some pages to talk about Hamza.

== Publications ==
=== Poet Diwans ===
- I start from a walking number (original title: Abdaa mn raqam yamshi) (1978)
- Talk too (original title: Kalam Aydan) (1982)
- A shadow of the lost (original title: Thelal leserat altaeeh) (1991)
- Like I am now (original title: kanany alaan) (1996)

=== Novels ===
- Tales of the poet Bluezar (original title: Hekayat alshaeer Bluezar) (1988)
- Cautious calm (original title: hedoo hather) (1999)

=== Books ===
- Selections from contemporary American poetry, two entries to the book Attitudes and Speeches by Mohammed bin Abdul Jabbar Ben-Hassan

=== Books about him ===
- Nazih Khatar = The beautiful (original title: Al-Hasnaa; 1983)
- Ahmed Fahim = The Arab struggle (original title: Alseraa Alarabi; 1983)
- Abbas Beidon = The ambassador (original title: Alsafeer; 1983)
