= Aadloun stele =

Ancient rock carving in Lebanon

Coordinates: 33.404°N 35.274°E

The Aadloun stele is a rock relief stele and inscription carved into the limestone rocks around the town of Aadloun in Lebanon, between Sidon and Tyre. Although heavily weathered when discovered in 1843, it was attributed to Ramesses II. It has been compared to the Stelae of Nahr el-Kalb approximately 60 km (37 mi) to the north.

In his 1843 publication of the stele, Jules de Bertou wrote:

The shape of [Aadloun's rock-cut] tombs is not the only stamp of antiquity that distinguishes this necropolis from other burial places found in Syria. We also see one of these Egyptian steles, quite similar to those we have drawn on the banks of Nahar-el-Kelb, not far from Beirut. The Adloun stele depicted a conqueror making an offering of prisoners to the god Phtha. This is all that can be recognized, even with the help of the shadows projected by the light of a torch. The corrosive action of the sea air has erased the hieroglyphic legend that covered this stele from the height of the god's shoulders to the bottom of the frame, and only a few isolated signs are visible.

== Gallery ==
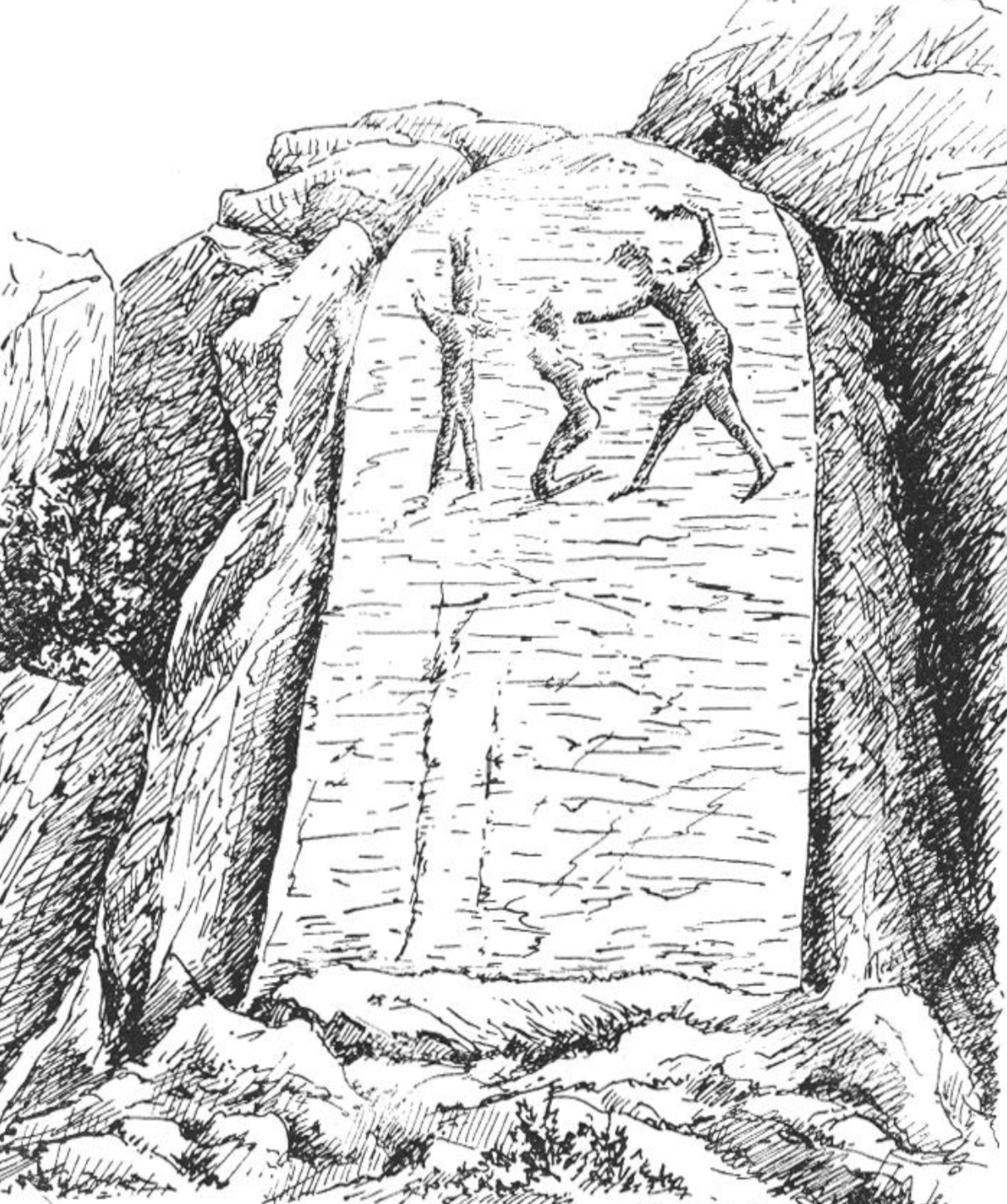

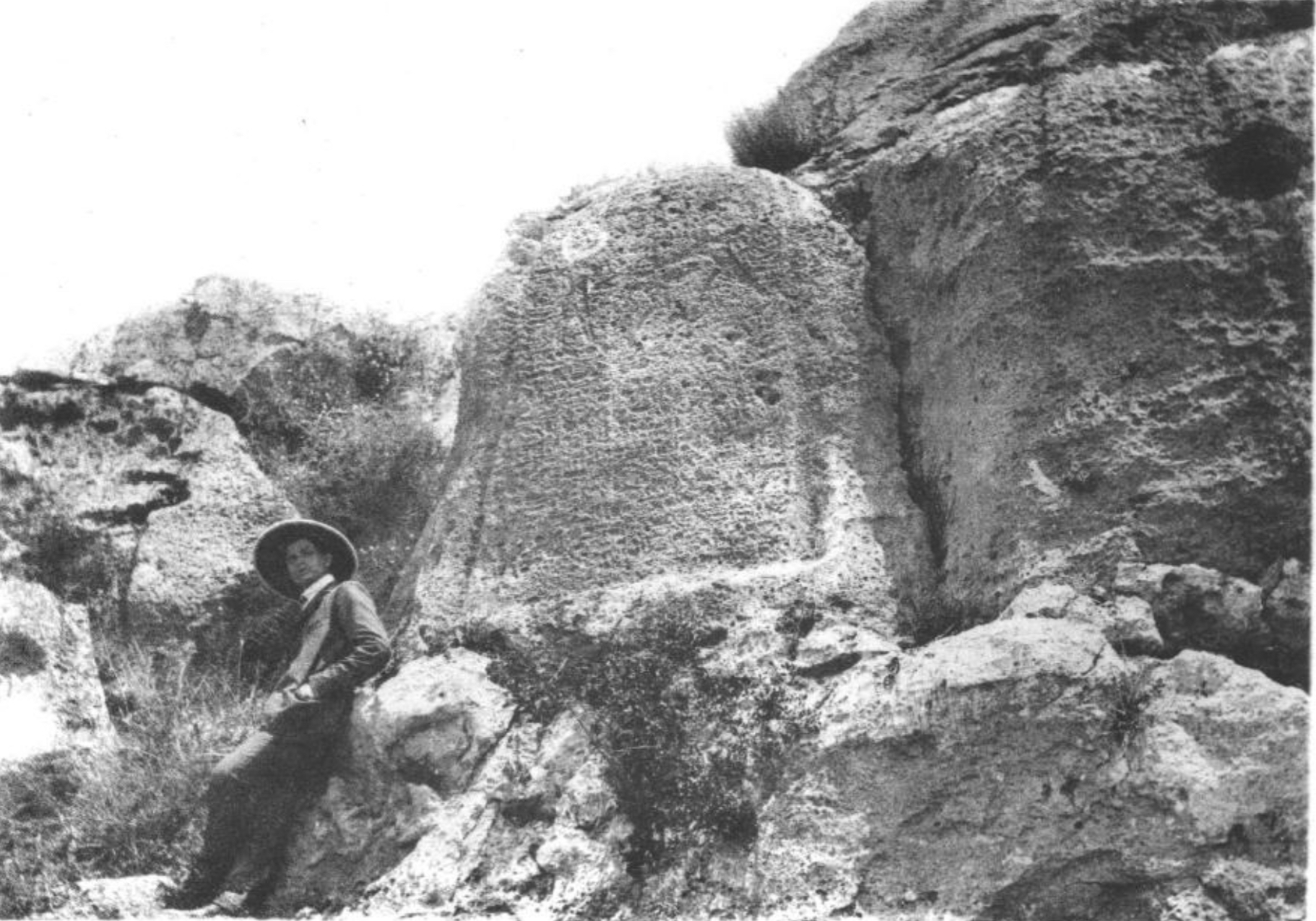

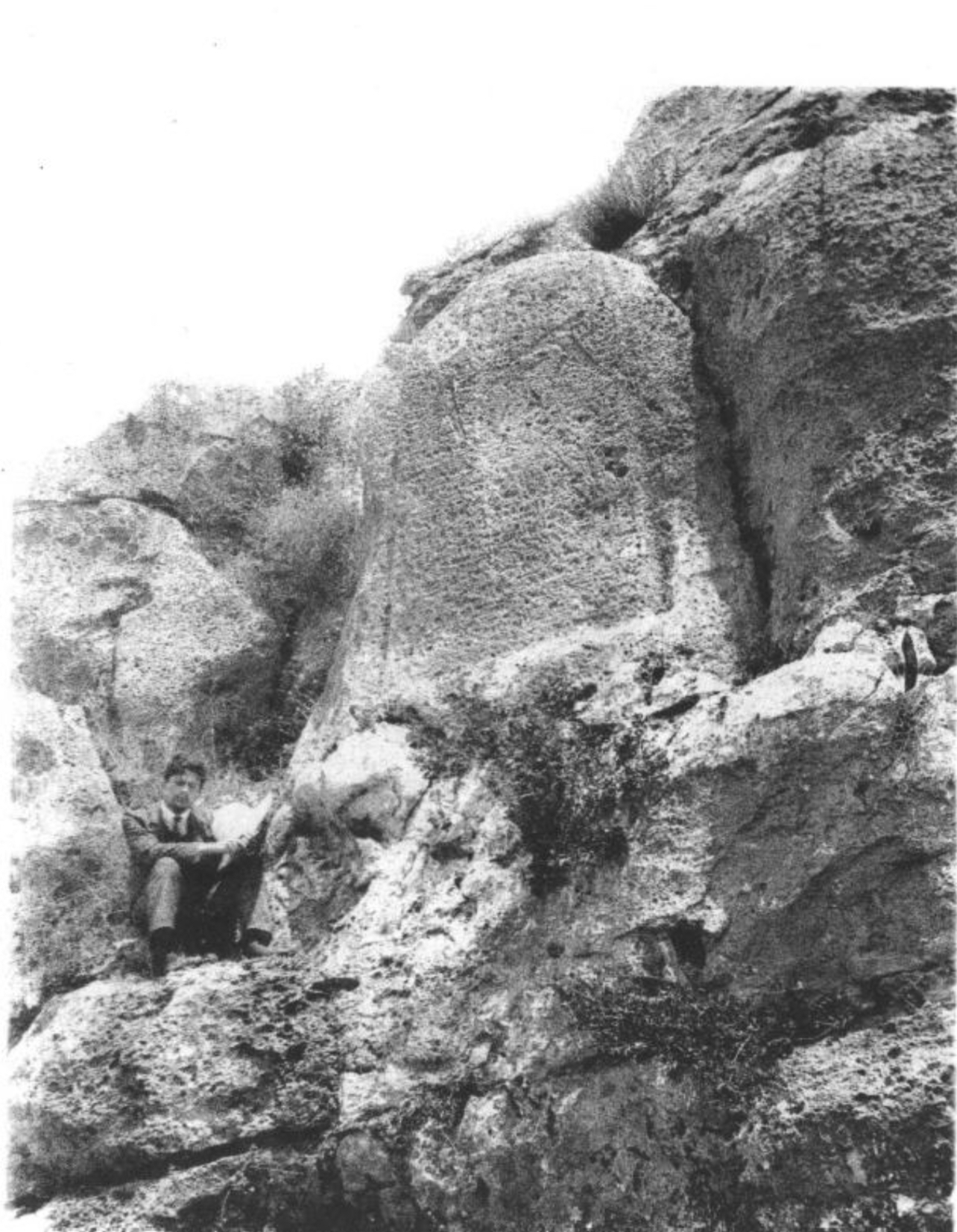

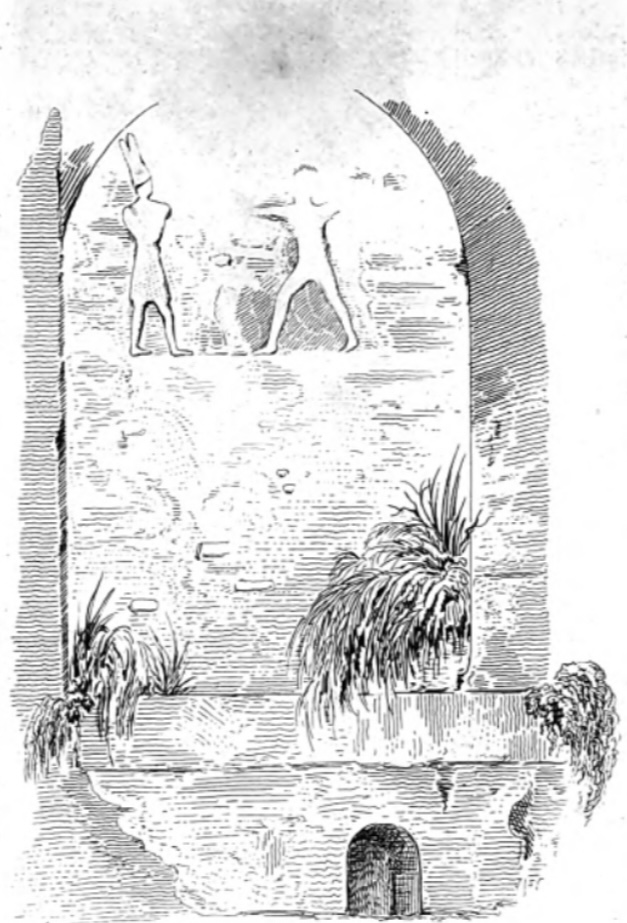

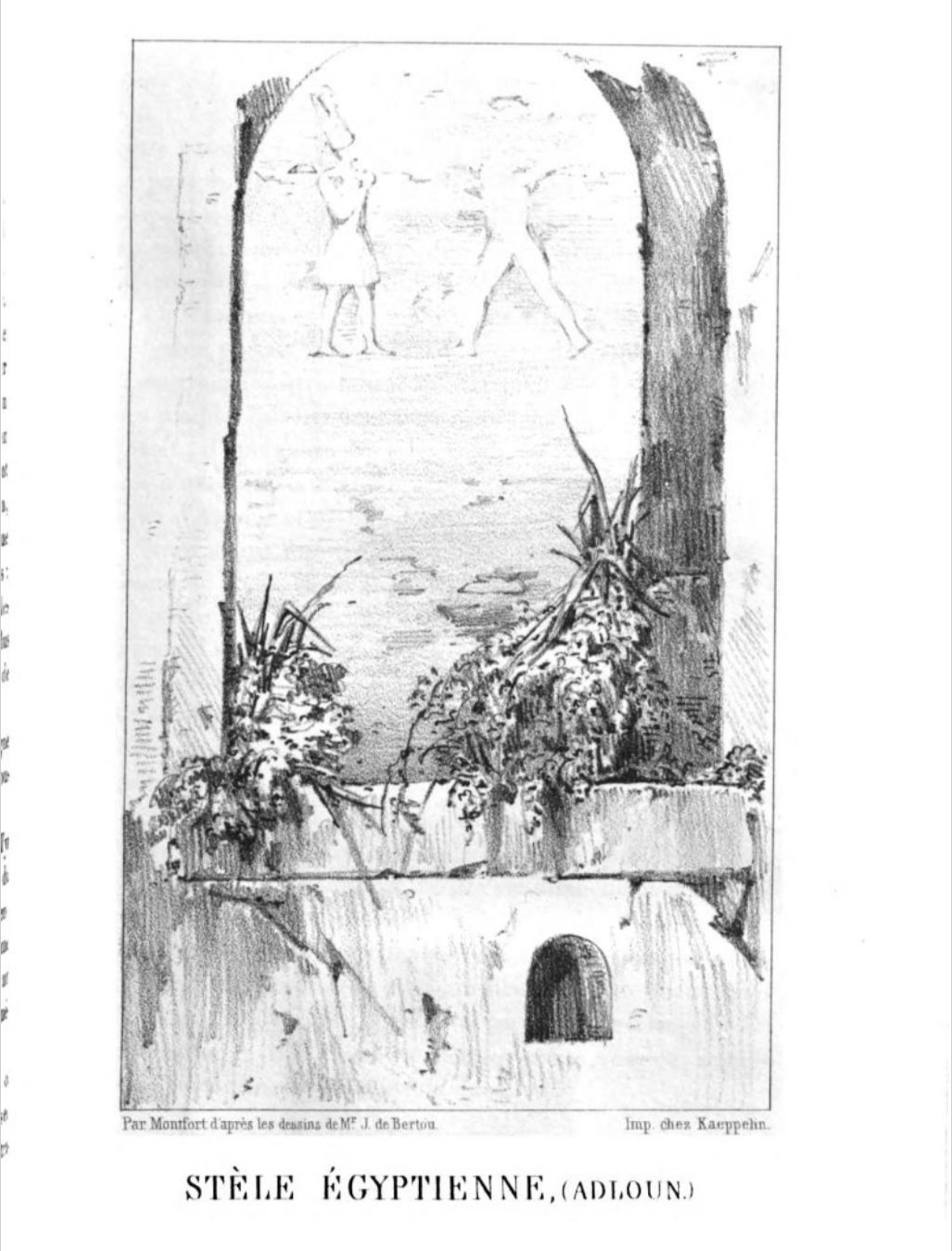

== See also ==
- Egyptian Stelae in the Levant
- Stelae of Nahr el-Kalb
