= Egyptian stelae in the Levant =

The Egyptian Stelae in the Levant are the approximately 25 Ancient Egyptian stelae discovered in the Levant, today known as Syria, Lebanon, Israel, Palestine and Jordan. The most notable examples are the Stelae of Nahr el-Kalb and the Beisan steles.

Only five pharaohs are represented: Thutmosis III and his son Amenophis II (1479–1401 BC), both 18th dynasty; Seti I (1290 BC to 1213 BC) and his son Ramesses II, both 19th dynasty; and Shoshenq I (943–922 BC), 22nd dynasty.

== List of known stelae ==
Original location	Image	Pharaoh / year	Preservation	Discovery date	Current location	Ref.
Stelae of Nahr el-Kalb	An Egyptian stele	Ramesses II, year 4	rock-stela, eroded	1697	in situ	
Stelae of Nahr el-Kalb	An Egyptian stele	Ramesses II, year 10	rock-stela, eroded	1697	in situ	
Stelae of Nahr el-Kalb	An Egyptian stele	Ramesses II	rock-stela, eroded, vandalized in 1860/61	1697	in situ	
Aadloun stele	An Egyptian stele	Ramesses II	rock-stela, eroded since destroyed	?	in situ, now destroyed	
Al-Shaykh Saad	An Egyptian stele	Ramesses II	complete, eroded	1891	(unknown)	
Tell Shihab	An Egyptian stele	Seti I	Fragment	1901	Istanbul	
Byblos	An Egyptian stele	Ramesses II, year 4	Two fragments	1919	Beirut	
Tell al-Nabi Mando	An Egyptian stele	Seti I	Fragment	1921	Aleppo	
Beisan steles	An Egyptian stele	Seti I	Fragment	1921	Rockefeller Archeological Museum	
Beisan steles	An Egyptian stele	Seti I, year 1	Complete	1923	Rockefeller Archeological Museum	
Beisan steles	An Egyptian stele	Ramesses II, year 18	Complete	1923	Penn Museum	
Beisan steles		Ramesses II	Two fragments	1923, 1925	Jerusalem and Penn Museum	
Tel Megiddo	An Egyptian stele	Sheshonq I	Fragment	1925-29	Jerusalem	
Tell el-'Oreimeh		Thutmosis III or Amenophis II	Fragment	1928	Deganya	
Byblos		Thutmosis III (?)	Fragment	1933-38	Beirut	
Tyre		Seti I	Two fragments	1960s	Beirut	
Tyre		Ramesses II	Fragment	1960s	Beirut	
Tyre	An Egyptian stele	Ramesses II	Fragment	prior to 1975	Beirut	
Al-Kiswah		Ramesses II, year 56	Fragment	1994	Damascus	
at-Turra		Ramesses II	Fragment	1999	in situ	
Maydaa	An Egyptian stele			2010		

== See also ==
- Sarcophagus of Eshmunazar II
- Tabnit sarcophagus
- Merneptah Stele

== Bibliography ==
- Wimmer, Stefan Jakob [in German] (2002). "A New Stela of Ramesses II in Jordan in the Context of Egyptian Royal Stelae in the Levant". Universitätsbibliothek der Ludwig-Maximilians-Universität München. doi:10.5282/UBM/EPUB.14236.
- Weinstein, James M. (1981). "The Egyptian Empire in Palestine: A Reassessment". Bulletin of the American Schools of Oriental Research (241). American Schools of Oriental Research: 1–28. doi:10.2307/1356708. eISSN 2161-8062. ISSN 0003-097X. JSTOR 1356708. S2CID 164015977.
