= Caphar =

Form of toll

A caphar was a toll or duty imposed by the Turks on the Christian merchants who traded their merchandise from Aleppo to Jerusalem. The term was derived from the Arabic term kifhara, which means "defence" or "protection". Individuals who manned these posts or leaders of armed groups who offered protection to merchants also claimed the right as a Caphar.

The caphar was introduced by the Christians themselves when they controlled the Holy Land. The toll originally supported troops and forces who were posted in the more difficult passes, to prevent pillaging from Arabs. But the Turks, who continued and even raised the toll, abused the practice, exacting arbitrary sums from the Christian merchants and travellers. This was on the pretense of guarding them from Arabs, with whom they frequently kept an understanding, and even favored their pillaging.
