= Destruction of cultural heritage during the 2024 Israeli invasion of Lebanon =

The 2024 Israeli invasion of Lebanon damaged or destroyed various cultural heritage sites. The damage was focused in southern Lebanon, with sites affected directly and indirectly. As well as individual sites, entire historic villages such as Muhaibib were destroyed. UNESCO granted enhanced protection to 34 heritage sites in the country.

== Background ==
Lebanon's Directorate General of Antiquities is a branch of government supervised by the Ministry of Culture and it is responsible for the country's national heritage sites. Lebanon's cultural heritage includes World Heritage Sites and includes traces from a variety of cultures including Phoenician, Roman, and Ottoman. Conflicts in the region have threatened Lebanon's cultural heritage, including the 2006 Lebanon War between Hezbollah and Israel.

In October 2023, Hezbollah began firing into Israel, in support of Palestine during the Israeli invasion of the Gaza Strip. The Israel–Hezbollah conflict escalated to the point of Israel launching a ground invasion of southern Lebanon on 1 October 2024. Over a million people were displaced from Lebanon, and 60,000 from northern Israel. A ceasefire was agreed in November, by which point 3,500 Lebanese citizens had been killed.

== Impact ==
Organisations such as Heritage for Peace have started documenting the destruction caused by the invasion, though Graham Philip of the Endangered Archaeology in the Middle East and North Africa project has said that the full extent of damage caused by the conflict was still unclear. Philip also contrasted the damaged caused with the destruction of cultural heritage by the Islamic State, saying that while the former was deliberate the impact to heritage sites in Lebanon was likely to not be intentional, however the greater scale of bombing made damage more likely.

Settlements in southern Lebanon sustained extensive damage: an analysis by Le Monde found that 38% of buildings in the region had been damaged or destroyed during the conflict. Entire villages, such as Muhaibib, were demolished by the Israel Defence Force (IDF) using explosives encompassing historic houses and recently built structures. Lebanon's Director General of Antiquities, Sarkis Khoury, said "The complete and systematic destruction of the historical memory of these villages is the most damaging thing." Biladi, a non-governmental heritage organisation, reported that between the beginning of the invasion in September and the ceasefire in November more than twenty heritage sites were damaged, including nine that were destroyed. In addition to direct damage to heritage sites, explosions may cause indirect damage and accelerate decay processes.

=== Religious sites ===
On 9 October, the 19th-century church of St George in Derdghaya was hit by an IDF airstrike; at least eight people sheltering in the church were killed when it was destroyed. On 13 October, an 18th-century mosque in Kfar Tibnit was destroyed during an Israeli raid. Thirteen shrines and dozens of mosques were damaged during the conflict. On 6 November, an Israeli airstrike damaged the Ottoman era Manshiyeh house and the 150-year-old Hotel Palmyra in Baalbek. Also in Baalbek, the part of the historic north gate was damaged. The 400-year-old Grand Mosque of Bint Jbeil was completely destroyed during the 2026 Battle of Bint Jbeil.

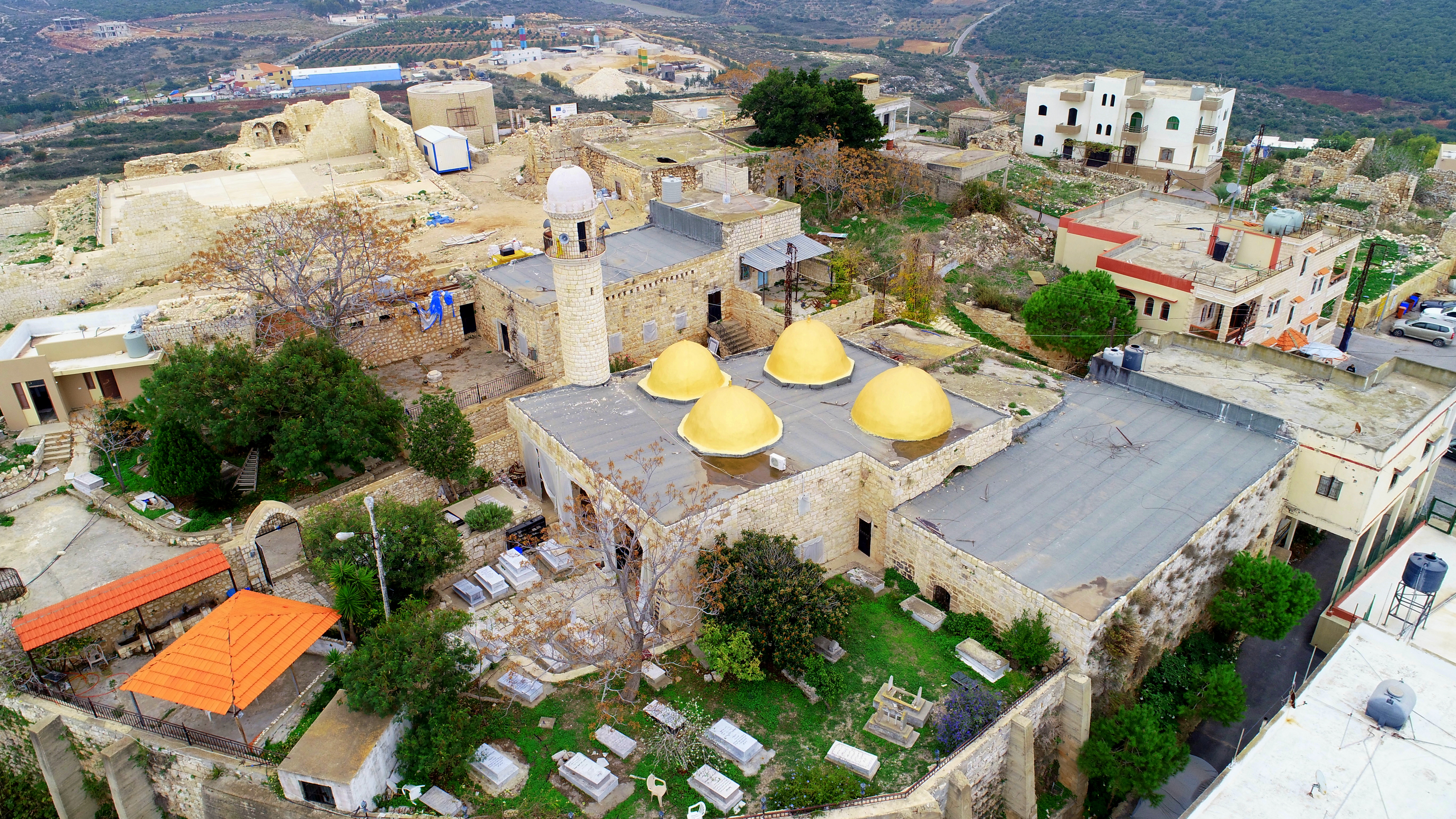
The Maqam Shamoun Al Safa (seen here in 2018) was damaged by Israeli forces during the invasion.

=== Archaeological and cultural sites ===
Early in the conflict, the IDF attacked Tibnin in southern Lebanon; the medieval castle sustained damage as a result and one of its walls collapsed. On 12 October, airstrikes destroyed a souk (market) in Nabatieh that dated from the Ottoman period (1516–1918).

The city of Tyre was bombarded and while the UNESCO World Heritage Site was not directly hit other historic sites in the city were damaged including structures dating to the Byzantine and Ottoman periods. According to Joanne Farchakh Bajjaly of Biladi, private buildings and historic houses have been especially vulnerable forms of heritage. The National Council for Scientific Research – Lebanon reported that the 12th-century castle at Shamaa and the nearby Maqam Shamoun Al Safa were deliberately damaged by Israeli forces using explosives. The medieval qubbat at Duris was also damaged.

== Reaction ==
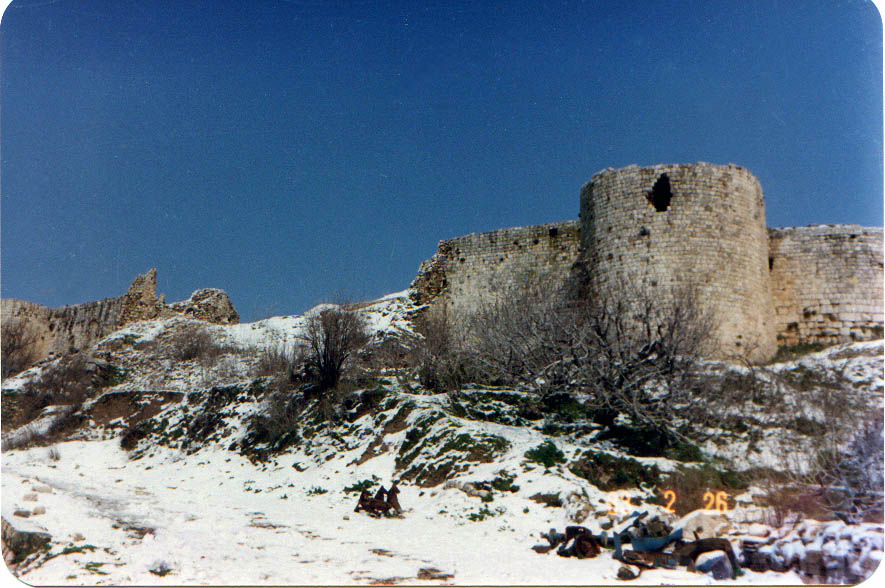
UNESCO gave 'enhanced protection' to 34 heritage sites in Lebanon, including Tibnin Castle. The medieval castle (seen here in 2006) was damaged during the invasion.

On 17 October 2024 the International Council on Monuments and Sites (ICOMOS) issued a statement on the loss of life caused by conflict in the region and the damage to cultural heritage. UNESCO held an emergency session the following month where it granted 'enhanced protection' to 34 sites in Lebanon, making financial resources available to aid their preservation. According to NBC News "Israel said that it only targets Hezbollah, but accuses the group of embedding itself in and near civilian infrastructure, including heritage sites". In the view of Amnesty International the destruction breached international humanitarian law and the organisation called for the actions to be investigated as war crimes.

=== List of heritage sites given 'enhanced protection' by UNESCO ===
The 34 sites are:

- Adlun archaeological site
- Afqa archaeological site
- Ain Herche temple and archaeological site
- Anjar archaeological site
- Baalbek archaeological sites
- Beiteddine Palace
- Byblos
- Chama’ Citadel
- Dakerman archaeological site
- Dubieh Castle – Chakra
- Hibarieh Temple
- Hosn Niha temple
- Jeb Jennine Roman Bridge
- Jiyeh – Porphyreon archaeological site
- Kaifun fort
- Kharayeb archaeological sites
- Majdel Anjar Temple
- Nahlé Temple
- Nahr el-Kalb archaeological site
- Oum el‘Amed archaeological site
- Qalaat Al-Chakif – Beaufort Castle
- Qalaat Deir Kifa (Maron Castle)
- Qalaat Tibnin (Toron Castle)
- Qasarnaba Temple
- Rachid Karami International Fair-Tripoli
- Ras Al Ain Basins and Built Heritage
- Sarepta archaeological site
- Sidon's archaeological sites
- Spring of Ain el Jobb archaeological site (Temnine el Faouqa)
- Tell el-Burak archaeological site
- The sanctuary of Eshmun
- Tyre archaeological sites
- National Museum of Beirut
- Nicolas Ibrahim Sursock Museum

== See also ==
- Byblos, Millennia-old City of Lebanon
- Destruction of cultural heritage during the Gaza war
- Destruction of cultural heritage sites during the 2026 Iran war
- List of destroyed heritage
- List of World Heritage Sites in the Arab states
