= Roman aqueduct of Paris =

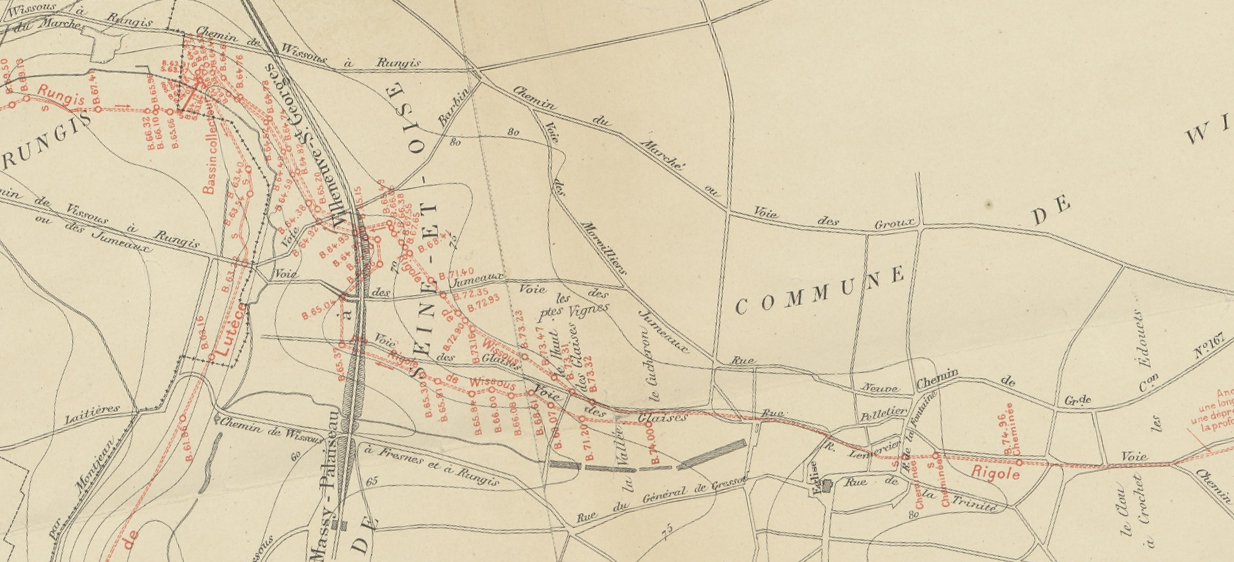
Plan of the aqueduct near Wissous

The ancient Roman aqueduct of Paris (also known as the Aqueduct of Lutetia) supplied Roman Paris, then called Lutetia.

It was a significant engineering and architectural achievement, bringing water from the south, 26 km distant under gravity with a constant gradual slope. It was mainly built underground, with one middle section on great arches to cross the Bievre valley. The water it supplied was of better quality than that of the Seine.

== History ==
It was probably built in the late 2nd century AD under Septimius Severus (r.193-211) to supply the thermal baths of Cluny, which were built around the beginning of the 3rd century, as well as other baths and public and private buildings. Around the mid-third century, invasions caused the inhabitants to desert the south bank and concentrate on the Île de la Cité when the aqueduct began to lose much of its interest.

== Route ==
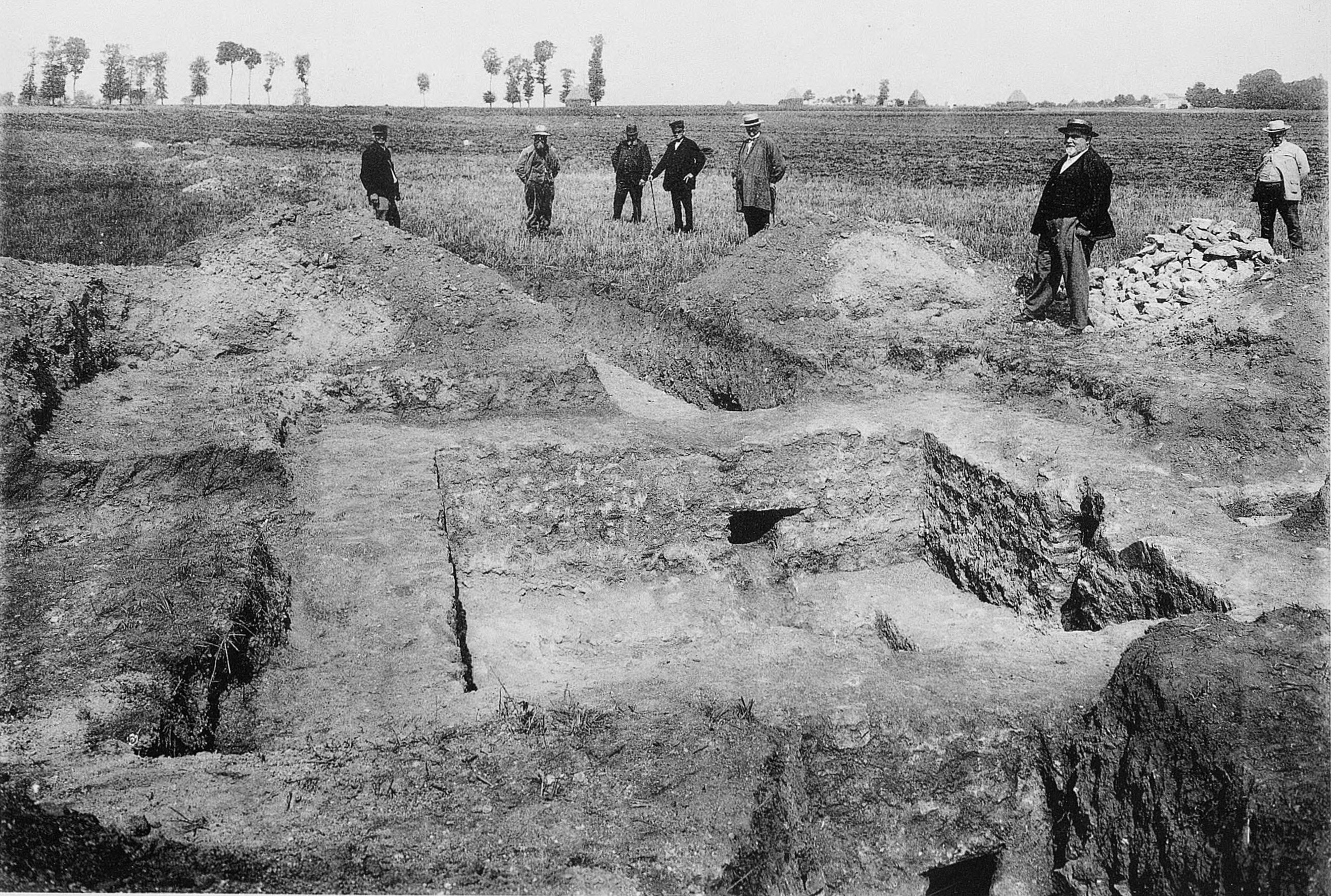
Collecting basin at Wissous

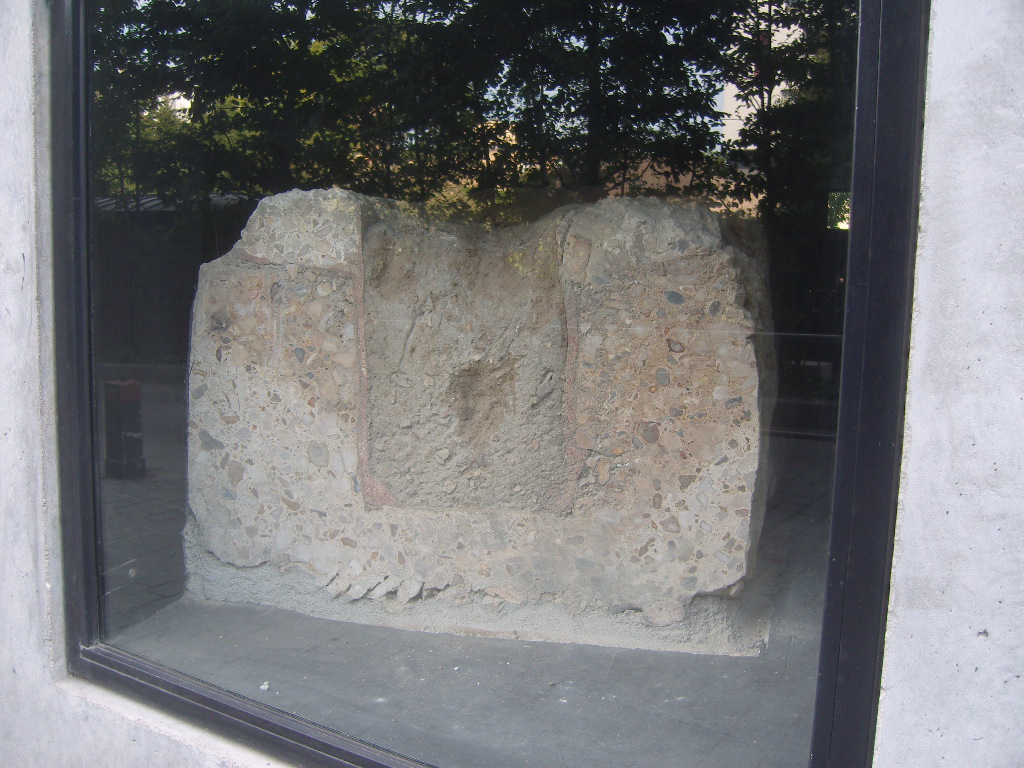
Remains discovered in the rue de l'Empereur-Valentinien

The water was collected from the springs and the plain drainage between Wissous, Rungis, Chilly-Mazarin, and Morangis in the department of Essonne. Small channels from this area flowed into a 15 m^{3} collection basin called the Carré des Eaux de Wissous. From here, the main aqueduct started and springs were collected along its route.

The aqueduct arrived in Paris at the Montsouris park, where several sections are preserved, then reached the Sainte-Geneviève hill by the rue Saint-Jacques and then into the ancient city, thermal baths, fountains, and palaces.

In general, the water flowed in an opus caementicium channel of variable outside dimensions (typically 0.6 m high by 1.3 m wide) and buried at a depth of about 1 m, with a 45 cm wide inside channel sealed with opus signinum and covered with stone slabs. Its average slope was 0.56 m/km. It is estimated that its flow was 1,500 m^{3}/day.

One of the most significant recent discoveries took place in Paris in 1996. Redevelopment of the sector where the former workshops of the Sceaux railway were located, between rue d'Alésia and avenue Reille, led to the discovery of an unknown section of the aqueduct, a part of which has been preserved in the Marie-Thérèse-Auffray garden.

== The Arcueil bridge ==
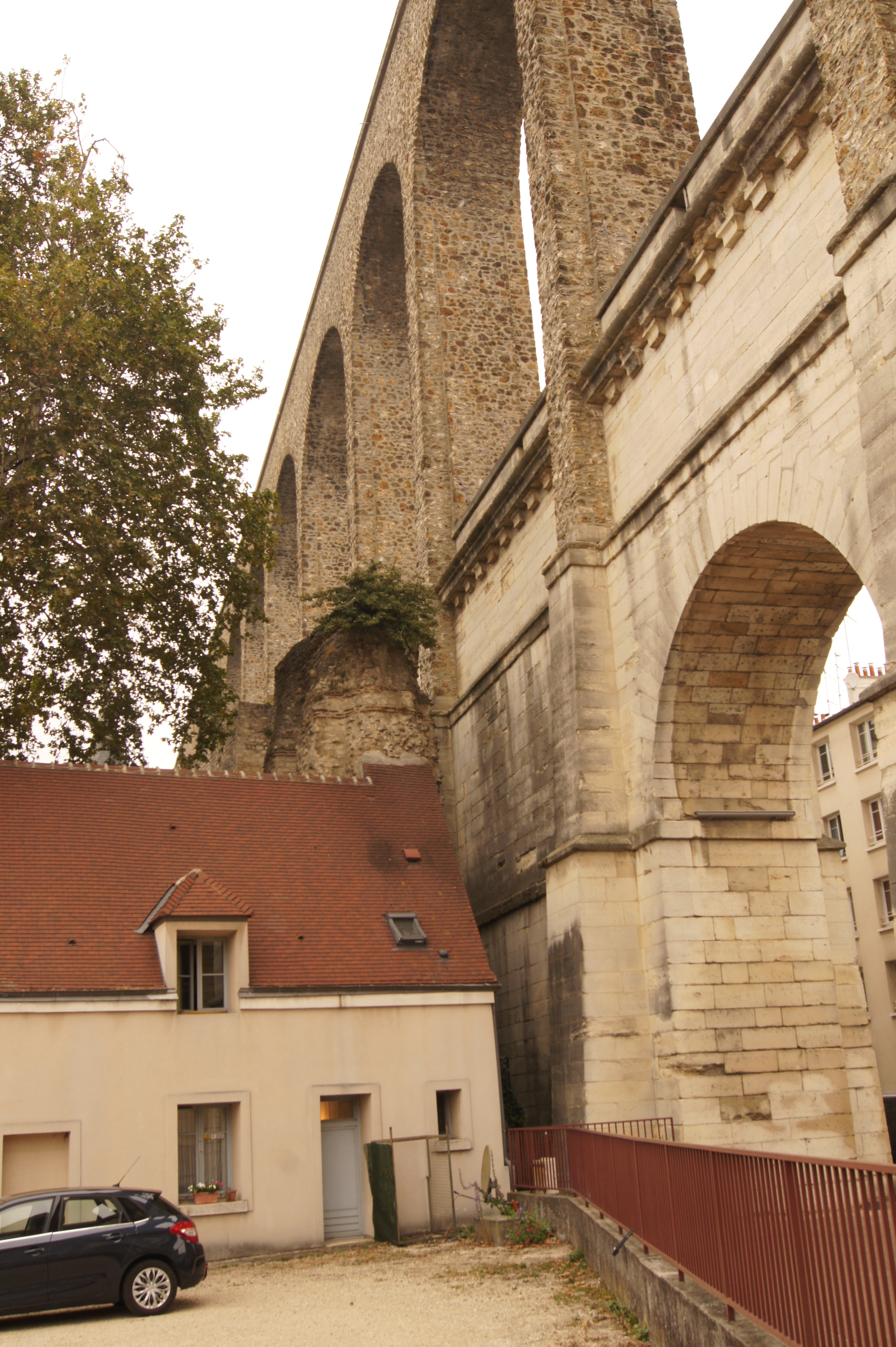
The Arcueil bridge

In Arcueil and Cachan, it passed from the eastern to the western hillside of the Bièvre valley using an aqueduct bridge. All that remains today is a collapsed arch and a few piles embedded in a wall in the property known since the Middle Ages as the Fief des Arcs. The arches of the bridge are the origin of its name, as well as that of the village itself. The Château des Arcs, built in 1548, encloses the remains of the aqueduct bridge. The bridge was about 300 m long, 18 m high, and had a single level of arches.

The Medici aqueduct bridge is very close to that of the ancient aqueduct.

== The collection basin ==
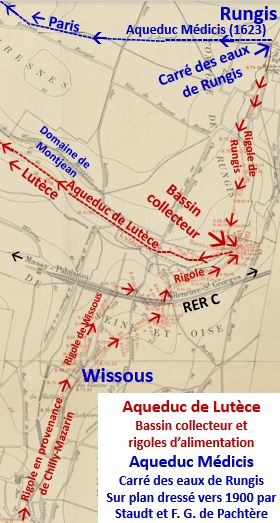
Plan of collecting basin and supply channels

The remains were rediscovered in the 19th century. They were subsequently excavated at the beginning of the 20th century by the Commission du Vieux Paris (CVP).

The rectangular collecting basin joined a series of channels from the south's sources, particularly those of Chilly and Morangis. Despite its historical interest, the basin was later covered by metres of rubble.

== Gallery ==
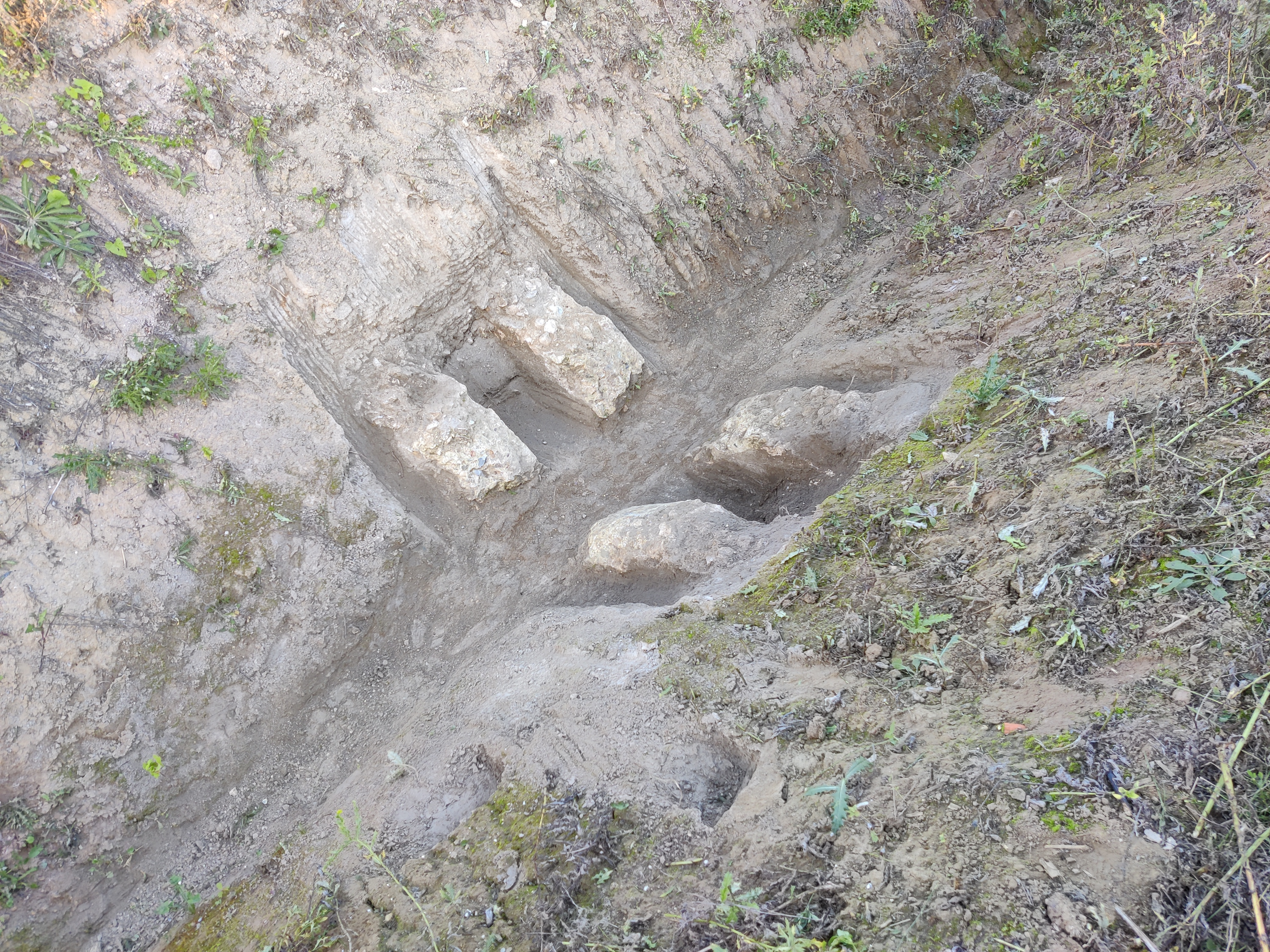
Feeder channel in the area of Montjean, Rungis

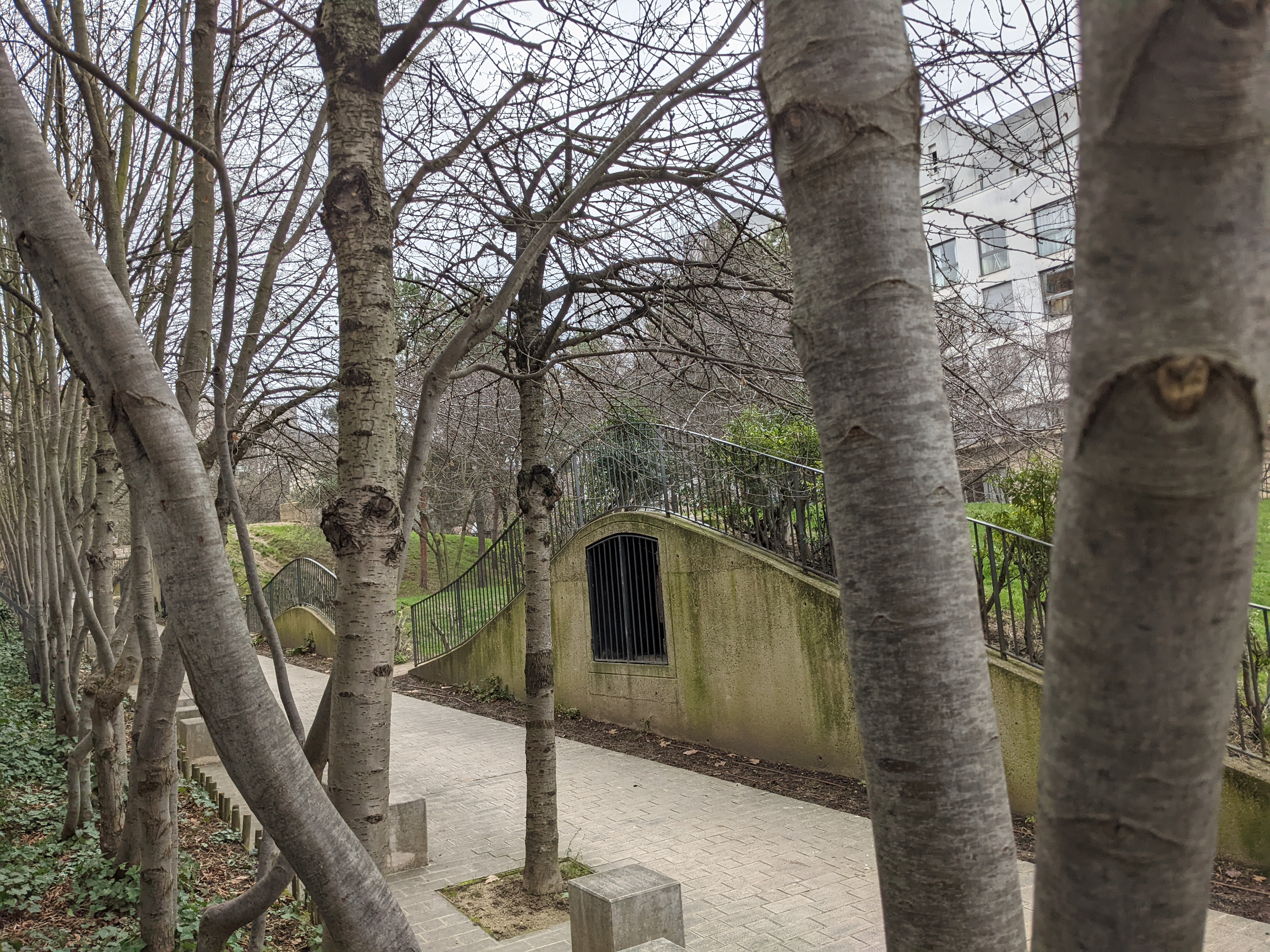
Jardin Marie-Thérèse Auffray

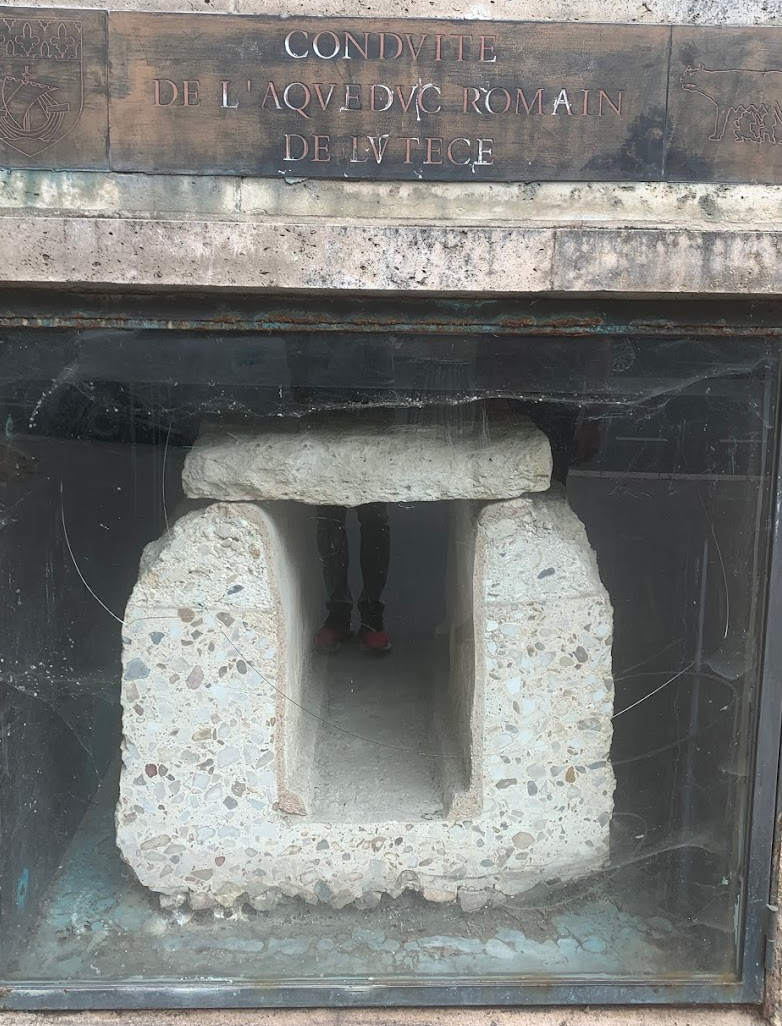
Avenue Reille
