= Kharayeb =

Kharayeb الخرايب
- Municipality
- Interactive map of Kharayeb
- Location within Lebanon
- Coordinates: 33°20′40″N 35°17′58″E
- Governorate: South Governorate
- District: Sidon District

Area
  - Total: 6.44 km^{2} (2.49 sq mi)
- Elevation: 190 m (620 ft)
- Time zone: UTC+2 (EET)
  - Summer (DST): UTC+3 (EEST)
- Area code: 07

Kharayeb (Arabic: الخرايب, romanized: al-Kharāyab) is a historic municipality in the Sidon District in the South Governorate, Lebanon. The town is 77 km (48 mi) south of Beirut, and stands at an average altitude of 190 m (620 ft) above sea level.

== History ==
Archaeological excavation in Kharayeb and its vicinity has revealed a complex settlement landscape spanning various chronological periods, from the Prehistoric to the Ottoman era (1516–1918). The Kharayeb region had been inhabited since the Middle Paleolithic, as evidenced by numerous flint tools. The earliest signs of agricultural use in historical periods comes from the site of Jemjim near Kharayeb, where a stele from the Late Iron Age was discovered. Excavations have also found a rural settlement with a complex system of cisterns dating to the Iron Age, and remains of terracotta vessels indicating occupation dating back to the second millennium BC.

During the Persian period (539–330 BC), Phoenicia flourished economically, and coastal city populations grew, necessitating resource optimization in their respective territories. The Persian policy aimed at promoting intensive agriculture within irrigated areas further supported this development. The subsistence of Tyre was ensured by the establishment of ancient rural agricultural centers, extending from the coast to southern Palestine. These rural areas, especially those situated near rivers, played a crucial role in Tyre's economy and witnessed the emergence of a series of planned settlements. It is within this territorial organization context that the expansion of the town of Kharayeb occurred, and the construction of its Phoenician temple was begun around the 6th century BC.

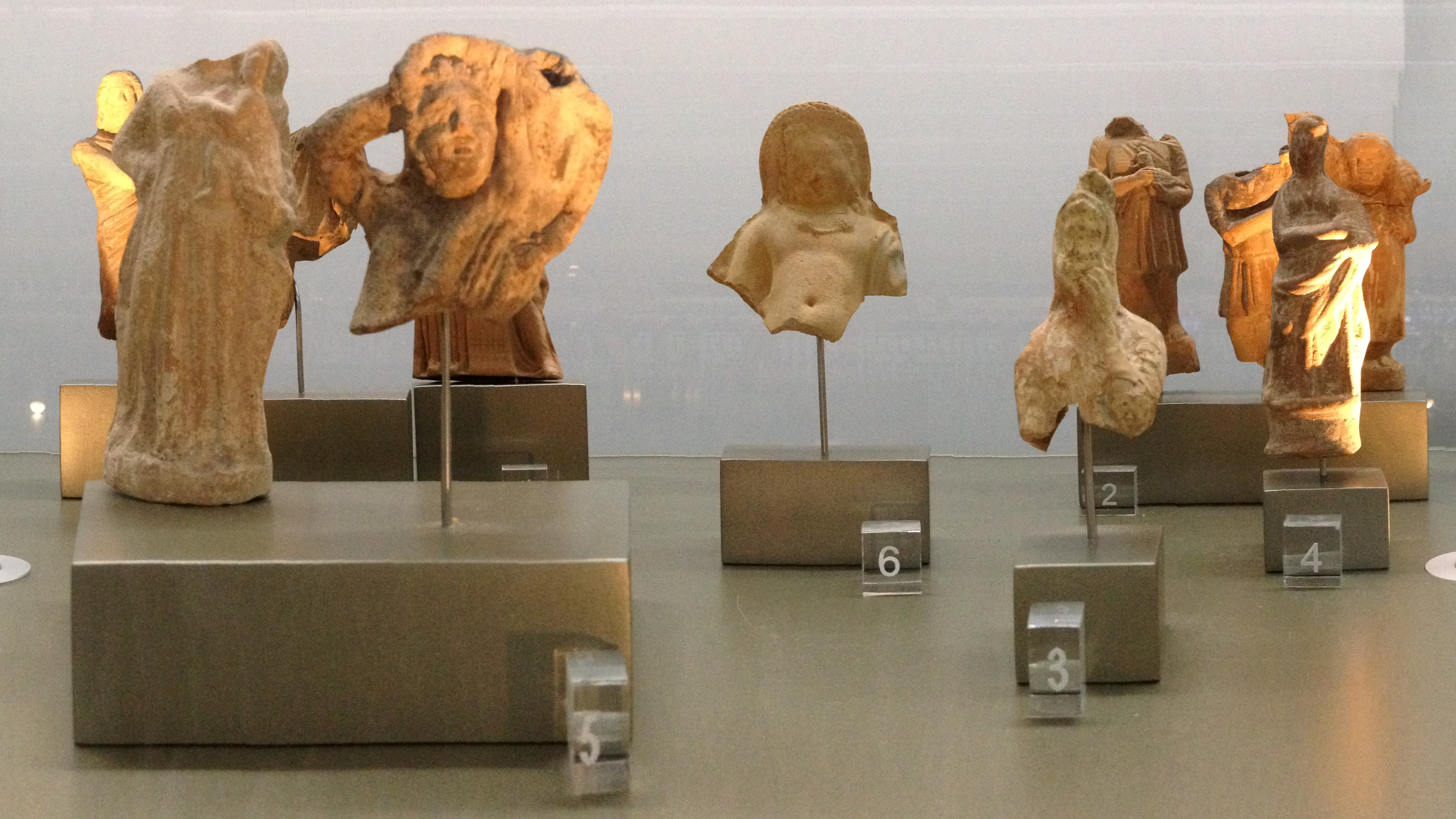
Figurines of the Hellenistic period (330–31 BC) from Kharayeb and Tyre, showcasing Greek influence, in a showcase at the Beirut Rafik Hariri International Airport

The modern town of Kharayeb dates back to the mid-19th century when it and its surroundings were owned by Nasif Al-Asaad, a resident of Zrarieh. For reasons that may have been economic or related to the feudal system of the time, ownership of Kharayeb transferred to the prominent Qaddura family of Sidon. According to local accounts, a meeting took place between the Al-Asaad and Qaddura families in 1885, in an area known today as Dahr Al-Awamid (Outcrop of the columns). After the passing of the family patriarch "Qadura Agha," ownership was passed down to his three sons: Raf'at, Bahjat, and Muhtaram. Each of them resided in the village, and families from neighboring areas began to move in. In 1925, during the French Mandate in Lebanon, the Qadura family began selling land parcels to the village residents. Affluent families bought lands, while the less well-to-do families pooled resources to purchase land parcels.

During the 2024 Israeli invasion of Lebanon, UNESCO gave enhanced protection to 34 cultural sites including the Kharayeb archaeological sites to safeguard them from damage.

== Geography ==
Kharayeb is in the Sidon District of the South Governorate. It is 77 km (48 mi) south of the capital Beirut, north of the Leontes River. It spans an area of 6.44 square kilometres (2.49 sq mi) and stands at an average altitude of 190 m (620 ft) above sea level. It is bordered to the north by the towns of Adloun and Kouthariyet Al-Riz. To the east, it is bordered by the towns of Arzai and Zrarieh, while the Leontes traces its southern boundary. The Mediterranean Sea lies to its west.

== Demographics ==
There were around 9,000 residents in 2006 and the population is predominantly Shia.

In 2014, Muslims made up 99.65% of registered voters in Kharayeb. 98.47% of the voters were Shiite Muslims.

The resident families are Akkoush, Dihini, Darr, Hammoud, Farkouh, Hayek, Hammadah, Zein, Bilal, Ezzeddin, Khalil, Tabbal, Hamdan, Shuman, Sharqaoui, Sbeity, Khalifa, Marwa, Kujuk, Ghazi, Saghir, Saab, Shour, Hraybi, Arrajah, Wehbi, Hijazi, Khalili, Jezzini, Al-Asaad, Saleh, Rahhal, Ismail, Al-Hajj, Haydar, Hani, Akhdar, Raad, Musa, Al-Faris, Hamdoun, Jawad, Hurani, Nasrallah, Ghoul, Ar-Rayes, Al-Hajj Mohammad, Al-Ali, Ahmed, Hussein, Kassirah, Kassem, Nasser.

== Cultural landmarks ==
The town is famed for its Phoenician temple, and the hoard of thousands of votive terracotta figurines, that helped shed light on the cultural and religious practices of the local Phoenician rural population during the Late Iron Age, Persian, and Hellenistic periods.
