= Phoenician sanctuary of Kharayeb =

Historic temple remains in Lebanon

- معبد الخرايب الفينيقي (Arabic)
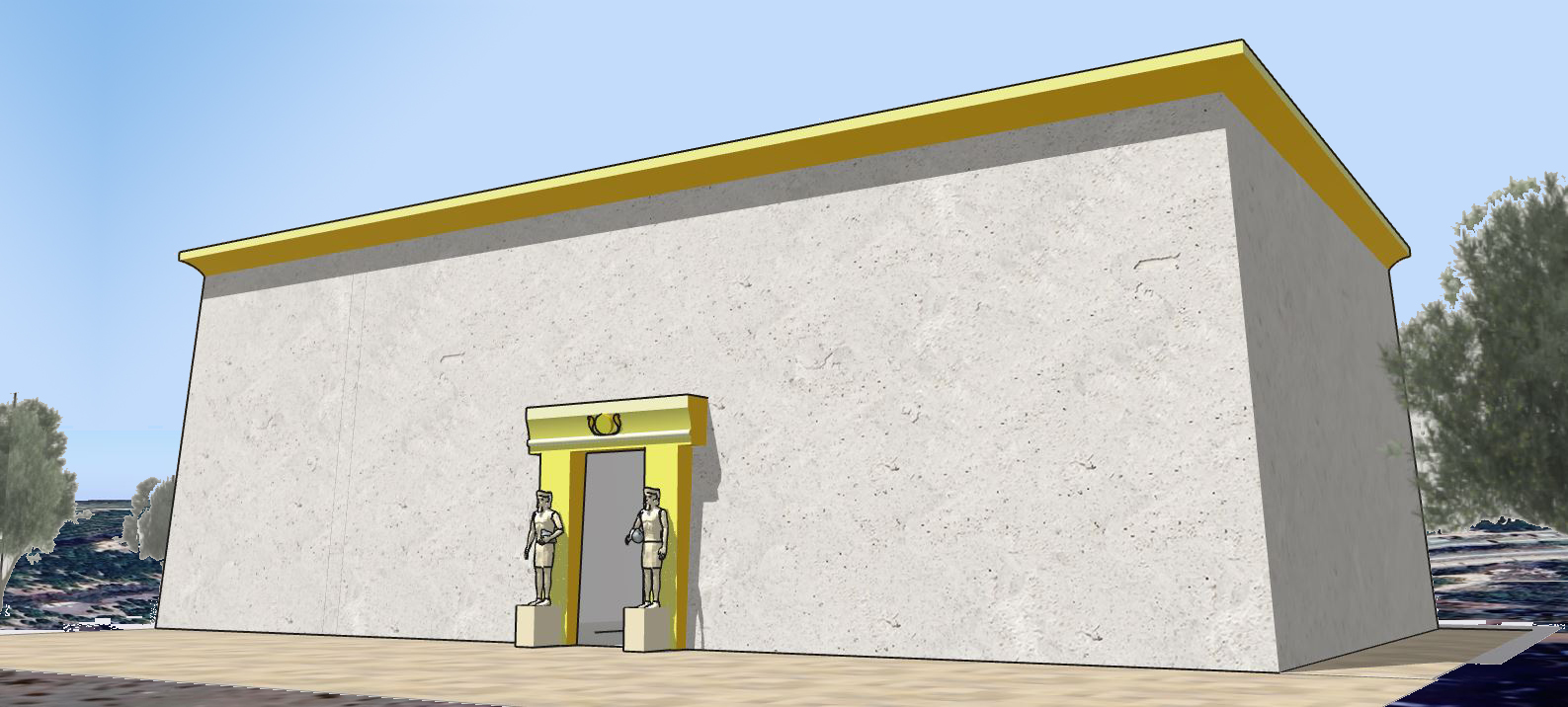
- Illustrative reconstruction of the sanctuary

- Location within Lebanon Location within Near East
- 33.3459°N 35.2815°E
- Cultures: Phoenician, Hellenistic
- Location: Kharayeb, South Lebanon

History
- Built: Iron Age II
- Abandoned: First century BC

Site notes
- Excavation dates: 1946; 1969; 2009–2013
- Archaeologists: Maurice Chehab; Brahim Kaoukabani; Ida Oggiano and Wissam Khalil
- Condition: Ruined
- Public access: Yes

The Phoenician sanctuary of Kharayeb (Arabic: معبد الخرايب الفينيقي) is a historic temple in the hinterland of Tyre, Southern Lebanon, that was excavated in three stages. In 1946, Maurice Chehab, head of Lebanon's Directorate General of Antiquities, led the first mission that revealed a Hellenistic period temple and thousands of clay figurines dating from the sixth-to-first centuries BC. Excavations in 1969 by the Lebanese archaeologist Brahim Kaoukabani and in 2009 by the Government of Italy yielded evidence of cultic practices, and produced a detailed reconstruction of the sanctuary's architecture.

The sanctuary originated in the sixth century BC with the establishment of rural agricultural centers near the growing city of Tyre. Initially, a temple was likely constructed from perishable materials. Only fragments of stone cultic statues survive from this phase. Around three centuries later during the Hellenistic period, a larger building fronted by a paved courtyard leading into a square hall and a smaller rectangular room., replaced the original structure. The interior was embellished with stucco, a central mosaic flooring and gem-like, glass-paste wall decorations. The exterior had a cavetto cornice, a lintel with a sun disk and two uraei—representations of a sacred snake used as a symbol of sovereignty and divinity in Ancient Egypt—and the entrance was flanked by two standing Egyptian-style, male-figure statues. The architecture followed pre-Classical Phoenician temple design, which is characterized by features such as a "bent-entry" and an east-west orientation.

The sanctuary yielded a collection of thousands of terracotta figurines and miniature vessels, and inscriptions that provide evidence of the religious practices of the local Phoenician population. The terracotta figurines from the Iron Age II and Persian periods depicted pregnant women, male figures, and deities. During the Hellenistic period, new molding techniques introduced Greek themes, and images of deities such as Aphrodite and Hermes. The religious practices observed at the sanctuary remained faithful to local Phoenician traditions, and were part of a wider cultic system that was practiced in the Tyre hinterland, involving similar rituals in other sanctuaries in the region. The deity to whom the sanctuary was dedicated remains unidentified because the unearthed inscriptions lack specific god names. The large number of figurines depicting children has been interpreted as evidence for cultic practices associated with childhood and childbearing and possibly with deities of healing and salvation. The discovery of around 8,000 terracotta figurines indicates intensive religious activity spanning centuries that ended in the first century BC.

== Location ==
The Phoenician sanctuary of Kharayeb is located on a hilly plateau at the entrance to the town Kharayeb, which is near Jemjim on the hills overlooking the Mediterranean Sea, and just north of the Leontes River 77 km (48 mi) south of Beirut, Lebanon. Historically, the Kharayeb sanctuary was within the territorial boundaries of the Phoenician city of Tyre, whose territory extended along the Levantine coast from Sarepta in the north to Sykaminon in the south during the Persian period, as documented in the Periplus of Pseudo-Scylax dating to c. 350 BC.

== History ==
Relevant archeological periods
Prehistory
- Middle Paleolithic: 300–30 ka

Ancient Near East
- Iron Age I: 1200–1000 BC
- Iron Age II: 1000–539 BC
- Persian period: 539–330 BC
- Hellenistic period: 330–31 BC

Modern Period
- Ottoman period: 1516–1918

=== Historical background, foundation, and decline ===
Archaeological remains from Kharayeb and its vicinity date from the prehistoric through the Ottomanperiods. The region had been inhabited since the Middle Paleolithic as evidenced by the presence of flint tools. The earliest sign of agricultural use of the area comes from the archaeological site of Jemjim, where excavations have revealed a rural settlement with a complex system of Iron Age cisterns, along with ceramics indicating occupation during the second millennium BC.

During the Persian period, when Phoenicia was under Achaemenid rule, the Phoenician economy flourished and the coastal cities' populations grew, necessitating resource optimization. According to the French historian Josette Elayi, Achaemenid-period economic policy encouraged the expansion of agriculture and irrigation in Phoenician territory. To ensure the subsistence of the city of Tyre, rural agricultural centers extending from the Phoenician coast to Mount Carmel in Palestine were established. These settlements supplied agricultural produce to Tyre and led to the emergence of planned settlements. The earliest evidence for a place of worship at Kharayeb dates to around the sixth century BC. The establishment of the sanctuary of Kharayeb along a river, and in a relatively isolated location, occurred at a time when cults of deities of healing and salvation were emerging throughout the Levant.

Following Alexander the Great's conquest of the Persian Empire in 330 BC and his premature death, Hellenistic kingdoms emerged across the conquered Seleucid Empire in West Asia and Ptolemaic Egypt. Greek culture and language spread as far as modern-day India, resulting in a mixing of ancient Greek and local cultures. In Phoenicia, despite the prevailing use of the Phoenician language, the institutions and organizational structures of the coastal cities experienced a pronounced Hellenistic influence, which is less detectable in the inland rural regions. (Note: The classical historian Peter Green emphasizes that "The social strata of any society evolve historically at different speeds and in different ways. For the Hellenistic era, as for many other periods, a safe rule of thumb is 'The lower, the slower.' For the fellahin of Egypt, or the peasantry of Greece and Anatolia, very little changed over these three centuries except the identity and, sometimes, the severity of their (mostly alien) oppressors, whose unswerving aim was to extract as much tax-money and labor from them as could be done without provoking mass revolution.") During this period, the sanctuary was rebuilt. Concurrently, a surge in the use of Greek- and Ptolemaic Egypt-inspired imagery, subjects, and artistic motifs emerged in the heavily Hellenized coastal Phoenician cities. Inscriptions in the sanctuary of Kharayeb, which were written in Phoenician, indicate the rural population's persistent adherence to their native language (Note: "Et, plus curieusement, la majorité des inscriptions phéniciennes de Phénicie date de l'époque hellénistique : dans la ville et le territoire de Tyr, l'écrit phénicien conservé est même presque entièrement d'époque hellénistique" [And, more curiously, the majority of Phoenician inscriptions in Phoenicia date from the Hellenistic period: in the city and territory of Tyre, the Phoenician writing preserved is even almost entirely from the Hellenistic period.]) and traditional religious practices. The same conclusion could be drawn from the predominantly Phoenician inscriptions in the nearby sanctuary of Umm al-Amad. (Note: Not all of Umm al-Amad's inscriptions are in Phoenician, one is in Greek and reads ("ΑΒΔΗΛΙ[ΜΟΣ] / ΤΥΡΙΟΣ Χ[ΑΙΡΕ]" [Abdelim of Tyre, farewell]).) No archaeological evidence dating from later than the end of the Hellenistic period has been discovered in the sanctuary area, suggesting cultic activity at the sanctuary ceased in the first century BC after a long period of prosperity and intensive use.

=== Modern discovery ===
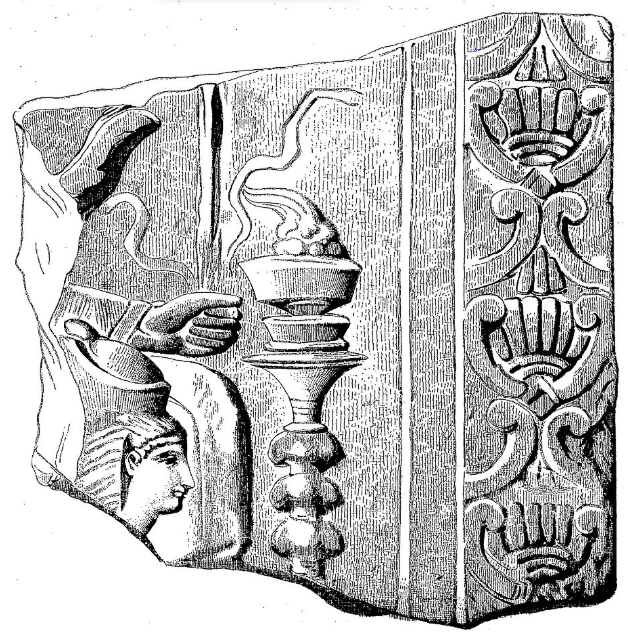
Sketch of the Jemjim relief, now in the Louvre

The region surrounding Kharayeb yielded a number of ancient artifacts, attracting the attention of scholars and explorers since the 19th century. In April 1863, a marble slab bearing intricate relief sculpture, which is believed to be a fragment of a door frame, was discovered among the construction materials of a house in Jemjim. The slab was acquired by local treasure hunter Alphonse Durighello. The relief depicts a seated female figure wearing a pschent, an Ancient Egyptian double crown, and she holds an incense burner. In his book Mission de Phénicie, French biblical scholar and orientalist Ernest Renan reported the discovery as being from the town of "Djamdjîne" (Jemjim). The locals of Kharayeb referred to the area where the Phoenician sanctuary was later discovered as Juret el-Khawatem ("the pit of the rings"), a name that derives from the practice of collecting what they thought were beads unearthed on the premises. They then fashioned their finds into bracelets and decorative accessories. (Note: Alternatively, the locals have called the area of the sanctuary Mahdoumeh ('the demolished place'), and after the start of the archaeological excavations al-Mathaf ('the museum').)

In 1946, prompted by the discovery of terracotta figurines, the head of Lebanon's Directorate General of Antiquities Service Maurice Chehab initiated excavations at Juret el-Khawatem. He unearthed the remains of a rectangular, cultic building dating from the Hellenistic period. In front of the building, near a paved courtyard, he uncovered a favissa, a sacred underground deposit containing thousands of clay figurines dating from the sixth-to-first centuries BC. In 1969, the Lebanese archaeologist Ibrahim Kaoukabani resumed excavations at the site. He unearthed figurines, significant architectural elements, including a lintel adorned with uraei—representations of a sacred snake—and two large statues that exhibited an Egyptian style attire. Kaoukabani published his preliminary excavation report in 1973. In 2009, the Government of Italy funded the re-examination and study of the sanctuary's clay figurines in the collections of the General Directorate of Antiquities in Beirut, and in November 2013, a new excavation project in the Kharayeb sanctuary site and its vicinity. The mission team was led by the archaeologists Ida Oggiano from Italy and Wissam Khalil from Lebanon. Several significant discoveries ensued, including a previously undiscovered section of the main rectangular cultic building. The Italian mission made a detailed reconstruction of the sanctuary, revealing the developmental stages of the cultic building. The team digitally reconstructed original architectural embellishments of the Hellenistic structure, showing intricate designs including colored mosaic tesserae, stucco, and glass ornaments.

== Architecture and description ==
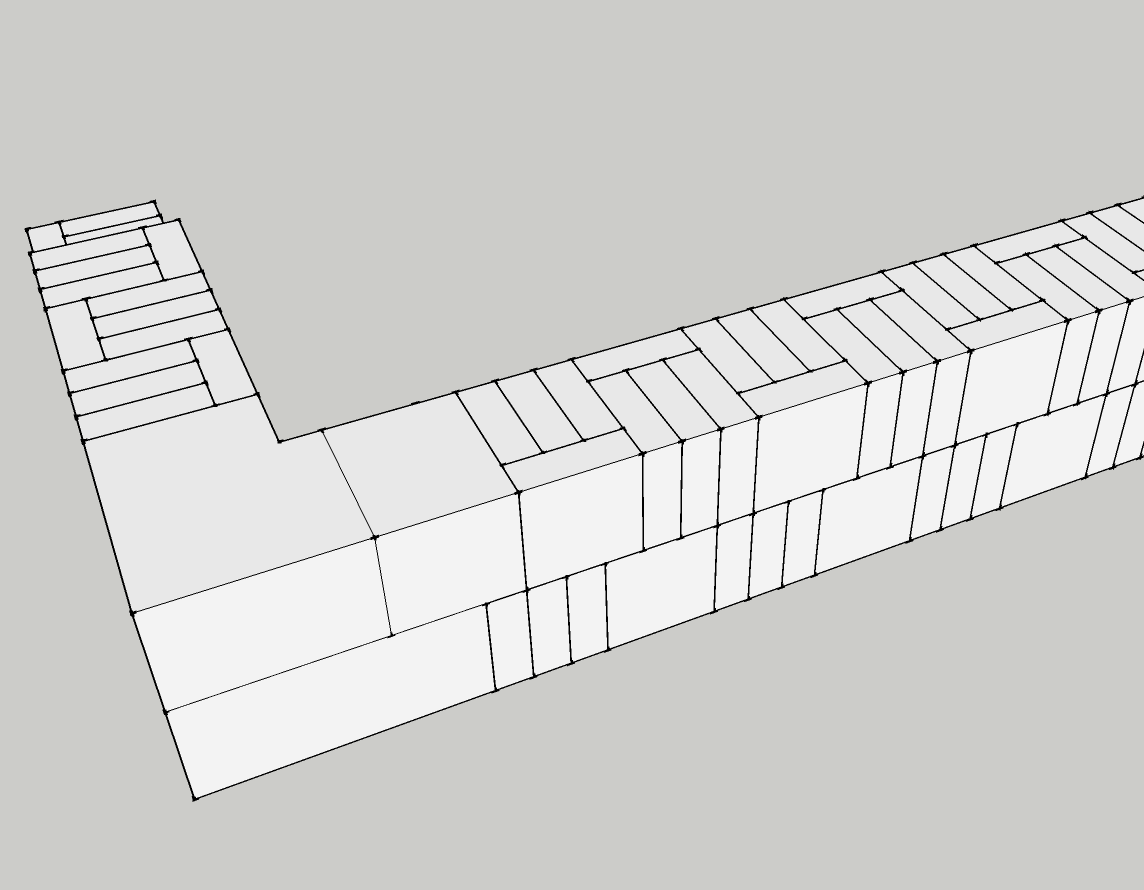
Header against stretcher ashlar construction technique used in the Phoenician sanctuary of Kharayeb

Archaeological evidence indicates the sanctuary was built in phases. A temple was initially built between the Iron Age II and Persian periods but remains have not survived intact, indicating it was likely constructed using perishable materials. In the initial phase, the sacred area housed at least one cultic statue, evidence for which is supported by the discovery of a fragment from a small statue dating to the first half of the sixth century BC that was found 20 m (66 ft) northwest of the sanctuary favissa. This statue resembles several examples of Cypriot cultic statues that were discovered among the materials of the favissa of the Phoenician temple in Amrit but it remains uncertain whether the Kharayeb statue was imported from Cyprus or locally produced. Kaoukabani found the feet of another statue of a different iconographic type. Cultic artifacts dating from the Iron Age II or Persian period were also discovered; these include figurines, small-and-miniature vases and pottery, and miniature altars.

In a later phase at the beginning of the Hellenistic period, the Iron Age II structures were replaced with a larger building. The surviving Hellenistic-period temple's main chamber measures approximately 13 m × 11 m (43 ft × 36 ft). Due to the sloping, rocky terrain, significant foundation work was done to level the flooring, and walls were built directly on the bedrock. The sanctuary then consisted of a large, paved courtyard leading to the southwest-facing temple façade. The temple consisted of a large, square hall that led to a smaller, rectangular room on the west-northwest side. The sanctuary's walls were constructed using stones and large blocks to provide stability, using a typical header-and-stretcher bond ashlar (Note: Finely-cut masonry stone) construction technique that is commonly seen in Persian and Hellenistic-period buildings in Phoenicia. Interior and exterior walls were covered with lime plaster, and the interior plaster was polished.

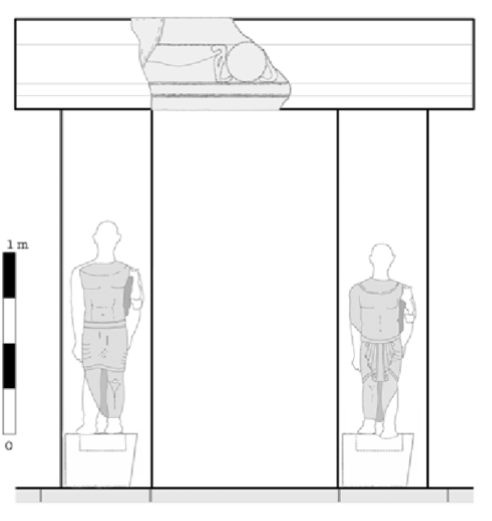
Oggiano's reconstruction of the entrance to the sanctuary in the Hellenistic period

The temple exterior was adorned with architectural design elements that were common in sacred buildings in the Tyre region, including a cavetto cornice and a lintel decorated with a sun disk flanked by uraei. The building's design and decorations resembled the sanctuary of Umm al-Amad. The temple's main entrance on the southwest-facing façade was flanked by two male-figure statues that wore an Egyptian-style loin cloth, the shendyt. Each statue has one advanced foot and the best-preserved of the figures shows traces of an animal held under the left arm. Such sculptures are typical of Phoenicia and Cyprus. In Phoenicia, examples of this type were found in Sarepta, Amrit, Byblos, Sidon, Tyre, and Umm al-Amad. Scholars believe these Egypt-inspired sculptural groups served as protective figures and were stationed at the entrance of Phoenician temples. At a later stage during the Hellenistic period, the floor of the large, square hall was paved with flat stone slabs. A group of multicolored mosaic tesserae was excavated, suggesting the presence of a simple, geometric, pattern mosaic in the center of the hall. The interior walls were embellished with stucco decoration that was similar to the ornate houses of the coastal cities of the Levant during that period, which had oval-shaped motifs, some examples of which Kaoukabani found on site. The building's interior decoration, which included the scattered gem-like glass pastes locals collected to make jewelry, was also dated to the Hellenistic period.

== Artifacts and finds ==
Excavations at the Phoenician sanctuary of Kharayeb have yielded many artifacts, including miniature vessels and thousands of terracotta figurines, that provide evidence of the native population's religious practices.

=== Votive terracotta figurines ===
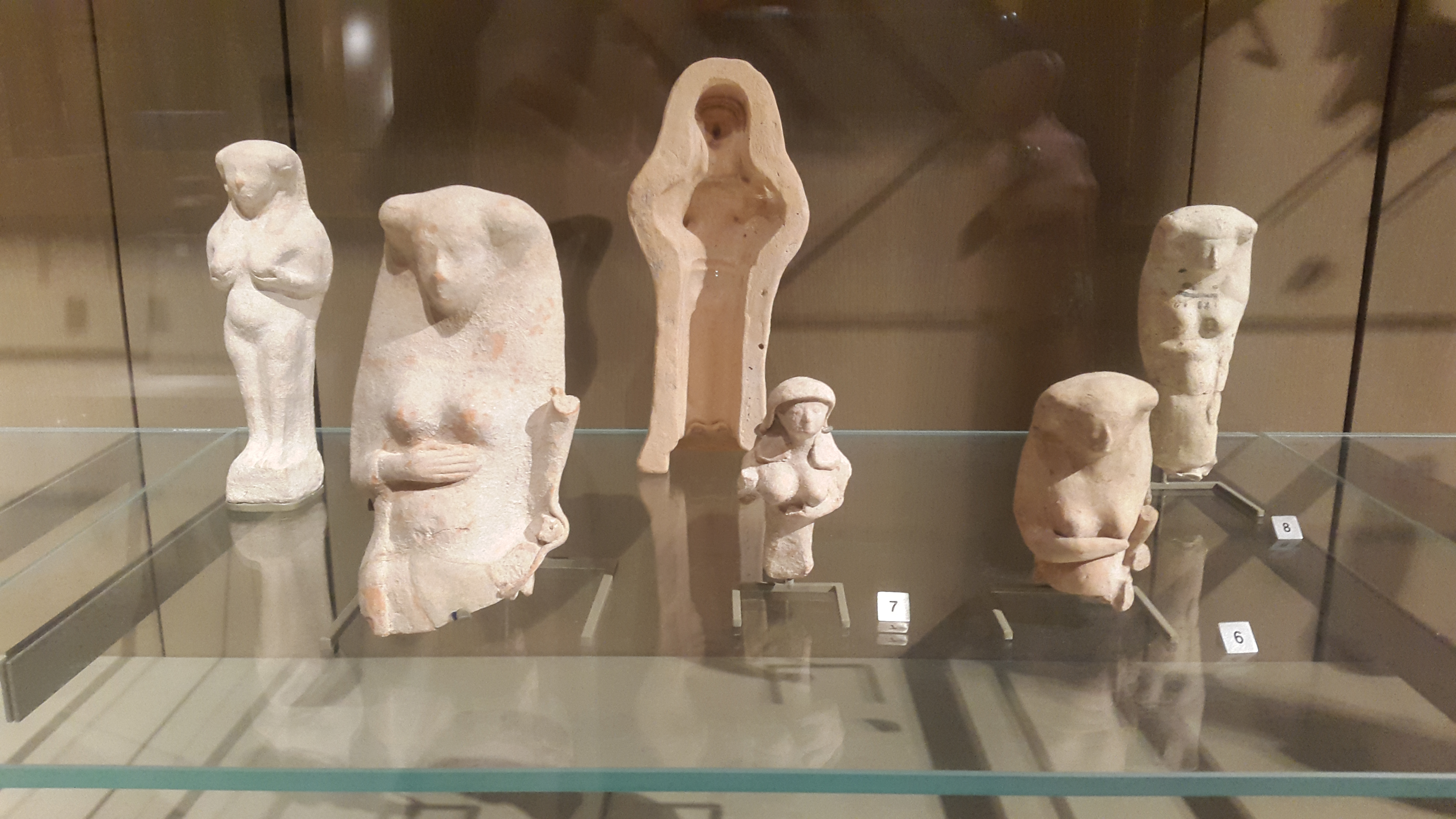
Figurines of the Iron Age from Kharayeb and Tyre, at the National Museum of Beirut

Terracotta figurines from the Iron Age II or Persian period, which artisans who produced images of a well-documented type found in Phoenicia (Sarepta, Tyre, Tell Keisan, Achziv, Dor) and Cyprus, produced locally. The repertoire of votive figurines includes pregnant women, women with their hands placed on their breasts, seated male figurines wearing an atef crown or with a flat hairstyle, horse riders, tambourine players, and the god Bes—an Ancient Egyptian deity that was worshiped as a protector of households, mothers, children, and childbirth.

In the Hellenistic period, a heavy influx of worshipers prompted local terracotta-figurine makers to adopt the more efficient and cost-effective double-molds technique, which was introduced from prominent Hellenistic figurine-production centers like Alexandria, Egypt. Original molds were acquired and modified to reflect local styles and contexts, and figurines were locally produced in Tyre as evidenced by clay ion-beam analysis, and the presence of incised Phoenician letters on the figurines before firing. The acquisition of molds with Greek iconography introduced images of Hellenistic deities, such as Aphrodite, Artemis, Demeter, Dionysus, Eros, Heracles, and Hermes, into the hinterland of Tyre. Figurines depicting deities are scarce compared to the quantity of cataloged pieces; most of the figurines depict human subjects and children engaged in playful activities. The imagery portrays the rural, pastoral environment in which the users of these figurines lived. There are figurines of schoolchildren and theater masks, suggesting a diverse range of worshipers, including those from urban centers. The inclusion of these motifs reflects the cultural and educational aspects of Hellenistic city life, indicating the sanctuary attracted devotees from rural areas and from coastal cities, where such themes were more prevalent in daily life. The influence of Alexandria is also apparent through figurines depicting a breastfeeding Isis, Horus, and Harpocrates.

=== Other finds ===
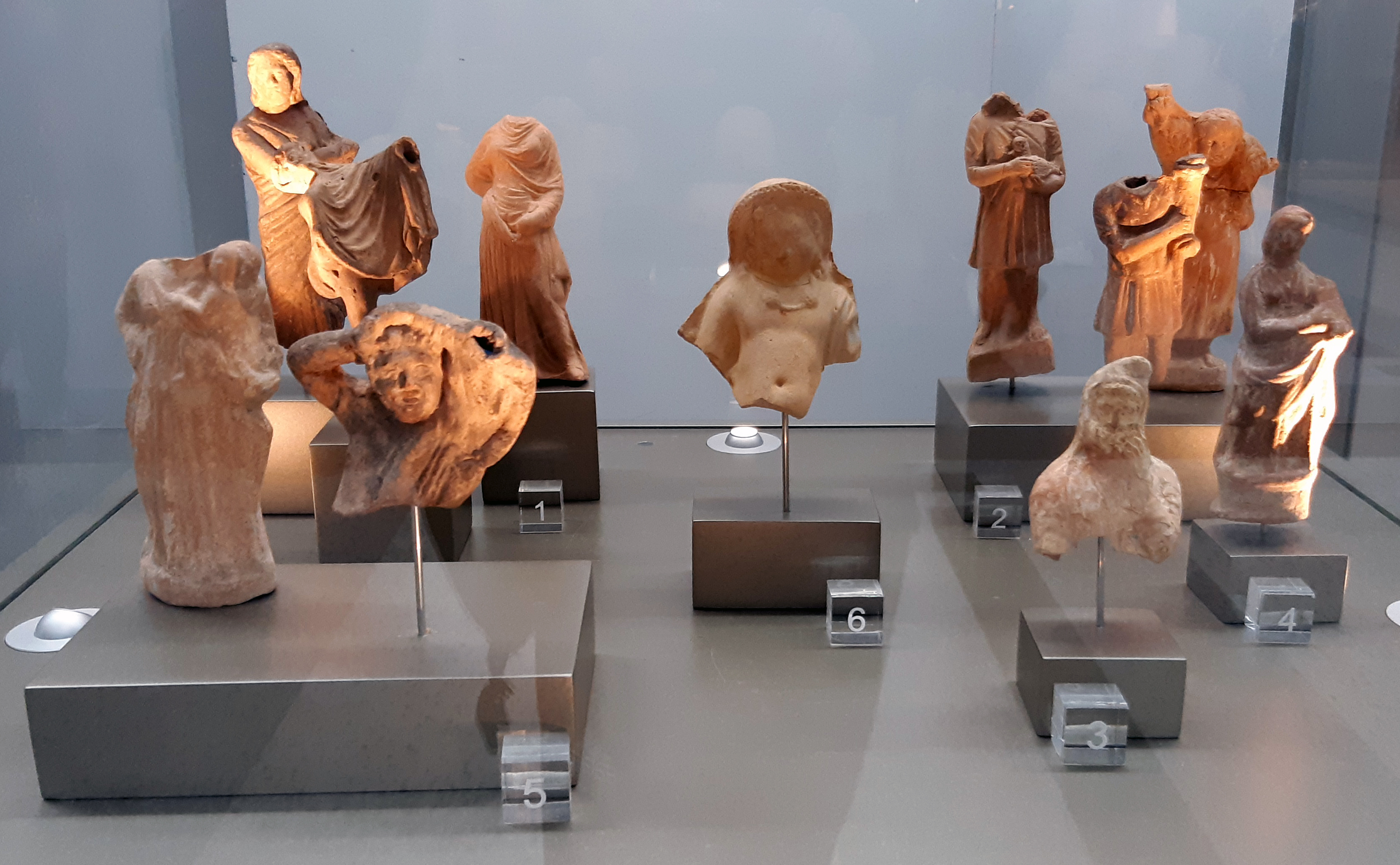
Figurines of the Hellenistic period (330–31 BC) from Kharayeb and Tyre, showcasing Greek influence, displayed at the Beirut Rafik Hariri International Airport

Miniature cultic pottery vessels were found in the Phoenician sanctuary of Kharayeb; these were used in rituals throughout the sanctuary's periods of use. The Italian mission found small plates and bowls beneath the temple's paving in the Iron Age II-and-Persian-period phase layers. Pottery from the Hellenistic phase include small and miniature unguentaria, miniature plates, and small jugs. Chéhab uncovered the remains of a lamb and an ankle bone that was used for divination within one of the small plates. A number of miniature altars dating to the Iron Age II and Persian period, and similar to ones found in Amrit, Sidon, and Tell el-Burak, were also found on site.

The site yielded a few inscriptions on votive figurines and on a fragment of a limestone statue Chéhab found at the bottom of the sanctuary's favissa. The fragment consists of a statue base on which both feet are depicted in profile with a carved Phoenician inscription between the legs. Chéhab translated the inscription in his 1952 excavation report as: "Because he heard the word of his servants". In 1955, he revised his interpretation as: "...of them, because he heard their words (prayers), may he bless them". The inscription was dated to the fourth century BC using comparisons with the inscription of the Batnoam sarcophagus (KAI 11) and Phoenician graffiti from Abydos, Egypt (KAI 49).

== Dedication and function ==
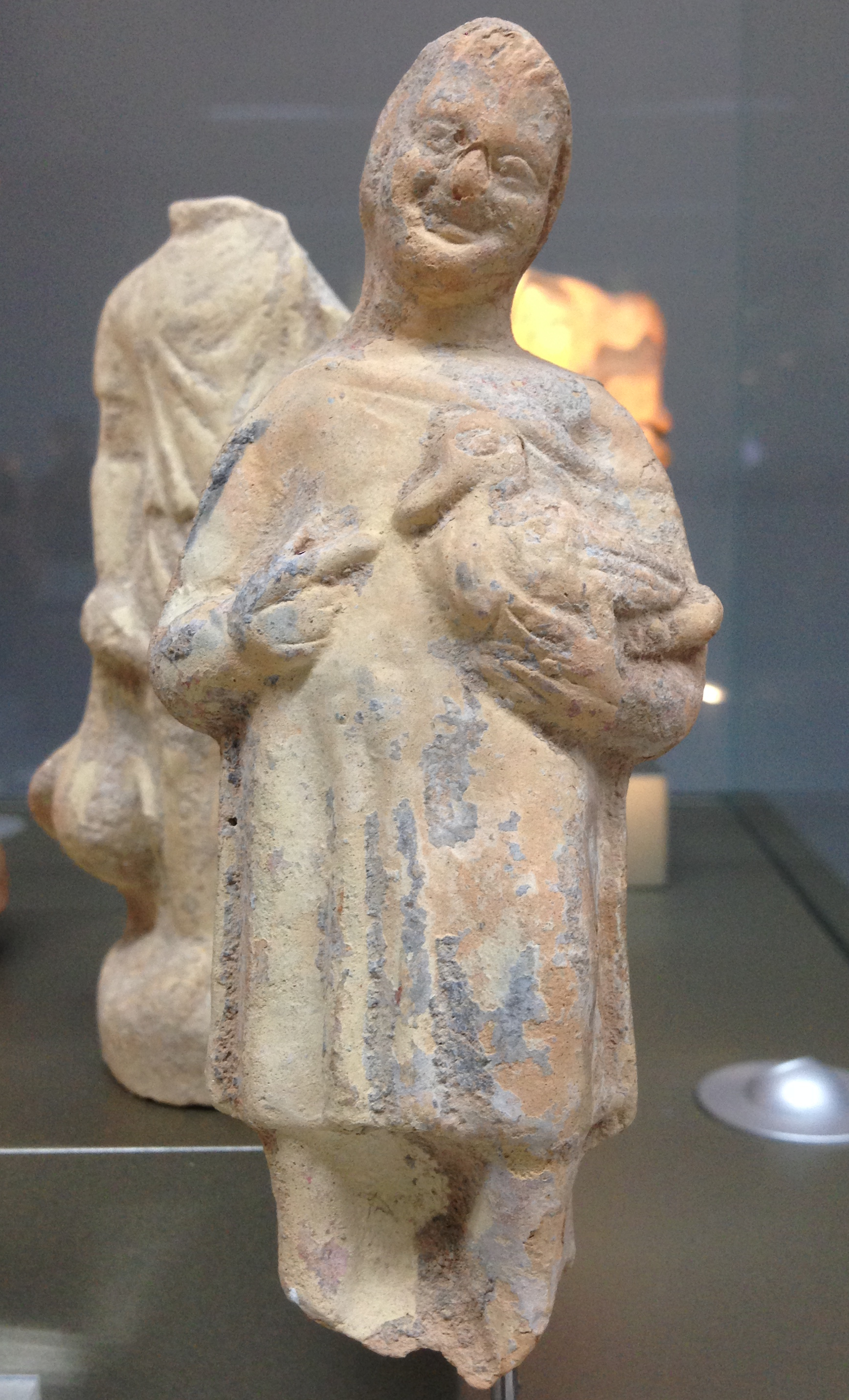
Terracotta figurine holding a duck from the Kharayeb sanctuary, in the collection of the National Museum of Beirut

Scholars have not identified the deity that was worshiped at the Phoenician sanctuary of Kharayeb because no god names are mentioned in the site inscriptions. Basing his proposal on figurines representing Demeter and Kore, the Greek goddesses of harvest and spring respectively, Chéhab proposed the sanctuary was a center for agrarian and initiatory cults. Kaoukabani proposed that the sanctuary was initially dedicated to Astarte; according to his interpretation, the building was a mammisi, a chapel-like building where rituals and ceremonies associated with the divine birth or infancy of a deity were performed. He also proposed the cult likely acquired characteristics related to Demeter and included mystical elements. The study of the terracotta figurines contributed to the understanding of the religious cult. The Italian historian Maria Grazia Lancellotti stated a revised understanding; he characterized the sanctuary as a smaller religious site that, like the temple of Eshmun in Bustan el-Sheikh in Sidon, centered around the veneration of deities of healing and salvation with an emphasis on rituals associated with childbearing and childhood. This interpretation explains the discovery of numerous child figurines onsite.

Oggiano places Kharayeb within a wider cultic system in the Tyre hinterland, noting similarities with practices at sanctuaries such as Umm al-Amad and Sarepta. These shared practices included the performance of comparable rituals, the dedication of stone and terracotta statues, and the use of a similar syntax of dedicatory inscriptions across the Tyre hinterland. The Eastern Temple in Umm al-Amad yielded twelve terracotta figurines, most of which were retrieved from the Throne Chapel. These figurines belong to the well-documented type associated with the Kharayeb sanctuary. The rituals practiced at the Kharayeb sanctuary also included the pouring of oils from unguentaria and the offering of libations that were poured from miniature and medium-sized jugs. The great number of clay figurines discovered at the sanctuary is evidence for the intensive religious activity in the Phoenician sanctuary between the fourth and first centuries BC. The temple's small interior was periodically cleared of votive offerings to accommodate new statuettes. Around 8,000 terracotta figurines were collected and stored in a specially dug favissa. The Kharayeb figurines portray aspects of local Phoenician society over many centuries, consistently emphasizing the significance of motherhood and childhood for the people frequenting the sanctuary. During the Persian period, a great number of figurines represented pregnant women and in the Hellenistic period, depictions of children engaged in playful activities with animals or music instruments were found. The small size of the cultic objects also indicates the potential involvement of children in rituals.

== See also ==
- Roman temple of Bziza – Cultural heritage building in Bziza, Lebanon
- Temple of Eshmun – Ancient temple to the Phoenician god of healing in Lebanon
