= Opus signinum =

Ancient Roman cement type

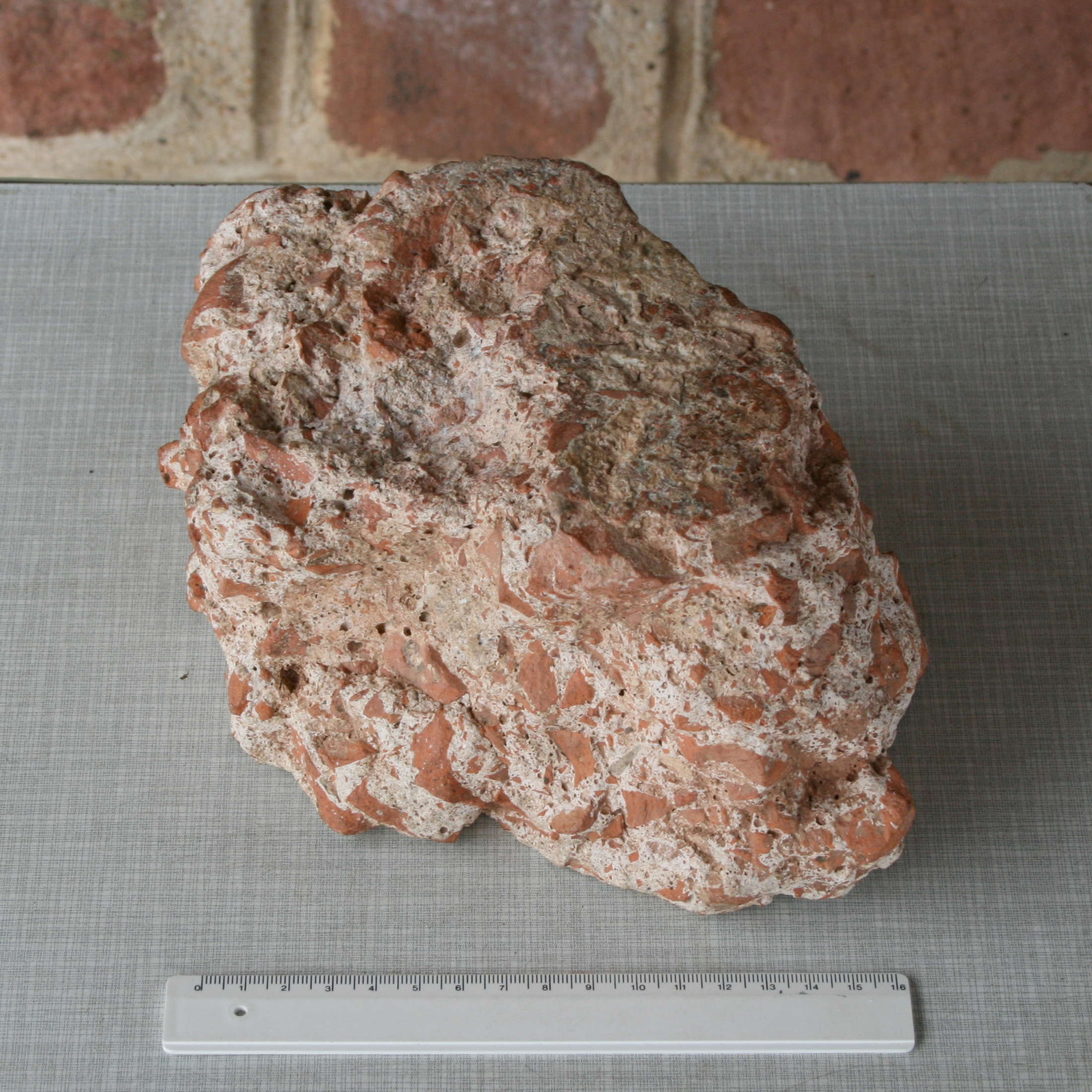
A piece of opus signinum from the Roman Villa of Haselburg, near Höchst im Odenwald

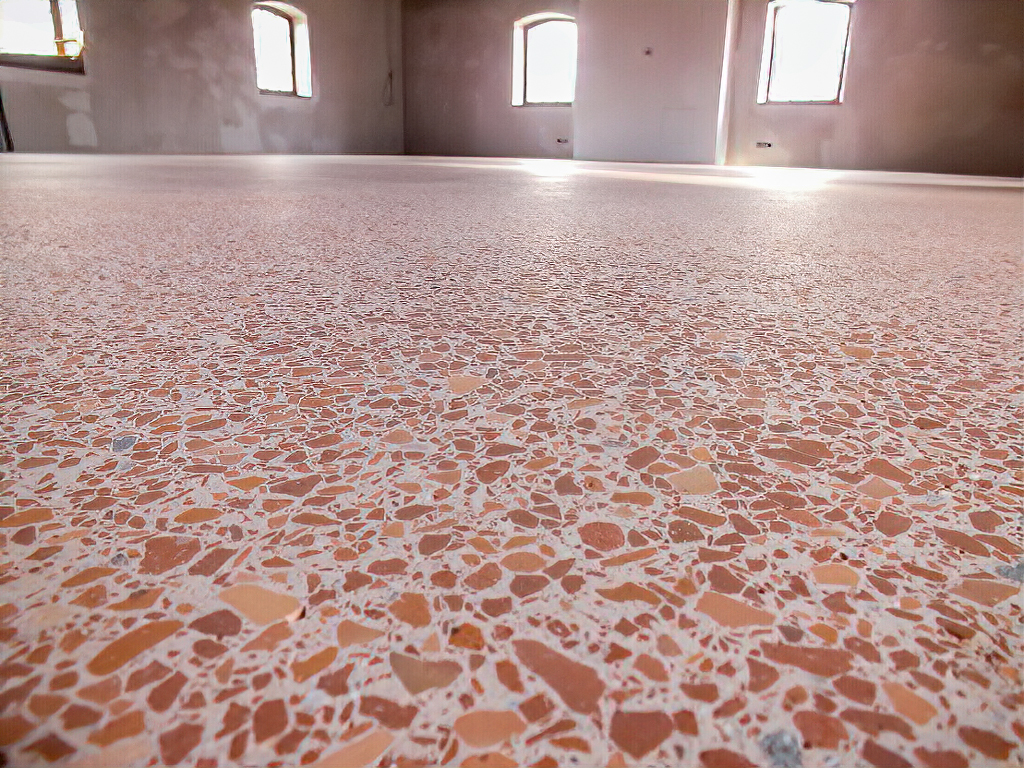
Reconstructed opus signinum in the European Archaeological Park of Bliesbruck-Reinheim

Opus signinum ('cocciopesto' in modern Italian) is a building material used in ancient Rome. It is a form of Roman concrete (opus caementicium), the main difference being the addition of small pieces of broken pot, including amphorae, tiles or brick, instead of other aggregates. Its main advantage over opus caementicium was that it is waterproof, the reason for its widespread use in Roman baths, aqueducts, cisterns and any buildings involving water. In floors it provided damp-proofing.

Pliny the Elder describes its manufacture:

Quid non excogitat vita fractis etiam testis utendo, sic ut firmius durent, tunsis calce addita, quae vocant signina ! Quo genere etiam pavimenta excogitavit.

What is there that human industry will not devise ? Even broken pottery has been utilised; it being found that, beaten to powder, and tempered with lime, it becomes more solid and durable than other substances of a similar nature; forming the cement known as the Signine composition, so extensively employed for even making the pavements of houses.

Pliny's use of the term signine references Signia (modern Segni), the town in Latium which was famous for its tiles.

== Origins, spread, disuse ==
The technique, most probably invented by the Phoenicians, is documented in the early 7th cent. BC at Tell el-Burak (Lebanon), then in Phoenician colonies in North Africa, some time before 256 BC, and spread north from there to Sicily and finally to the Italian peninsula. Floors of signinum are found extensively in the Punic towns of North Africa and commonly in the Hellenistic houses on Sicily. While some signinum pavements have been found in Rome, the technique is not common there. Vitruvius describes the process of laying a floor, whether signinum or mosaic. The trend began in the 1st century BC, proliferating in private homes as well as public buildings. By the 2nd century, opus signinum would give way to more patterned styles of pavement.
