= Muhaibib =

Village in southern Lebanon

Muhaibib محيبيب
- Municipality
- Location within Lebanon
- Coordinates: 33°09′17″N 35°30′20″E
- Grid position: 197/284 PAL
- Country: Lebanon
- Governorate: Nabatieh Governorate
- District: Marjayoun District
- Time zone: UTC+2 (EET)
  - Summer (DST): UTC+3 (EEST)
- Dialing code: +961

Muhaibib (Arabic: محيبيب), also spelled Mhaibib, is a municipality in the Marjayoun District in southern Lebanon.

Muhaibib holds a shrine to Benjamin, who Islam considers a prophet, which attracts pilgrims and visitors. In October 2024, Israeli forces demolished and bombed the entire village including the shrine.

== Etymology ==
E. H. Palmer wrote that the name Neby Muheibîb meant "the prophet Muheibîb", "beloved".

== History ==
In 1881, the PEF's Survey of Western Palestine (SWP) described Neby Muheibib as: "a small village [a]round the stone Neby, containing about seventy Moslems, situated on top of ridge, with olives and arable land; there are two cisterns in the village."

During the 2024 Israeli invasion of Lebanon, the Israel Defence Forces (IDF) released footage of themselves destroying nearly the entirety of Muhaibib. The New York Times connected a statement in which the IDF claimed that they had 'dismantled a tunnel network used by Hezbollah's elite Redwan Forces' to the destruction of the village. Al Jazeera published footage of Israeli soldiers they claimed were celebrating the destruction of the village.

The spokesperson for the US Department of State, Matthew Miller, said that "we do not want to see entire villages destroyed", nor "civilian homes". He claimed that there was potential for Hezbollah presence inside civilian homes. He then said: "I don't know what was in those buildings, I don't know what was potentially underneath those buildings."

== Demographics ==
In 2014 Muslims made up 99.55% of registered voters in Muhaibib. 97.91% of the voters were Shiite Muslims.

== Bibliography ==
- Conder, C.R.; Kitchener, H.H. (1881). The Survey of Western Palestine: Memoirs of the Topography, Orography, Hydrography, and Archaeology. Vol. 1. London: Committee of the Palestine Exploration Fund.
- Palmer, E.H. (1881). The Survey of Western Palestine: Arabic and English Name Lists Collected During the Survey by Lieutenants Conder and Kitchener, R. E. Transliterated and Explained by E.H. Palmer. Committee of the Palestine Exploration Fund.
