= Maqam Shamoun Al Safa =

Religious shrine in South Lebanon

- مقام شمعون الصفا
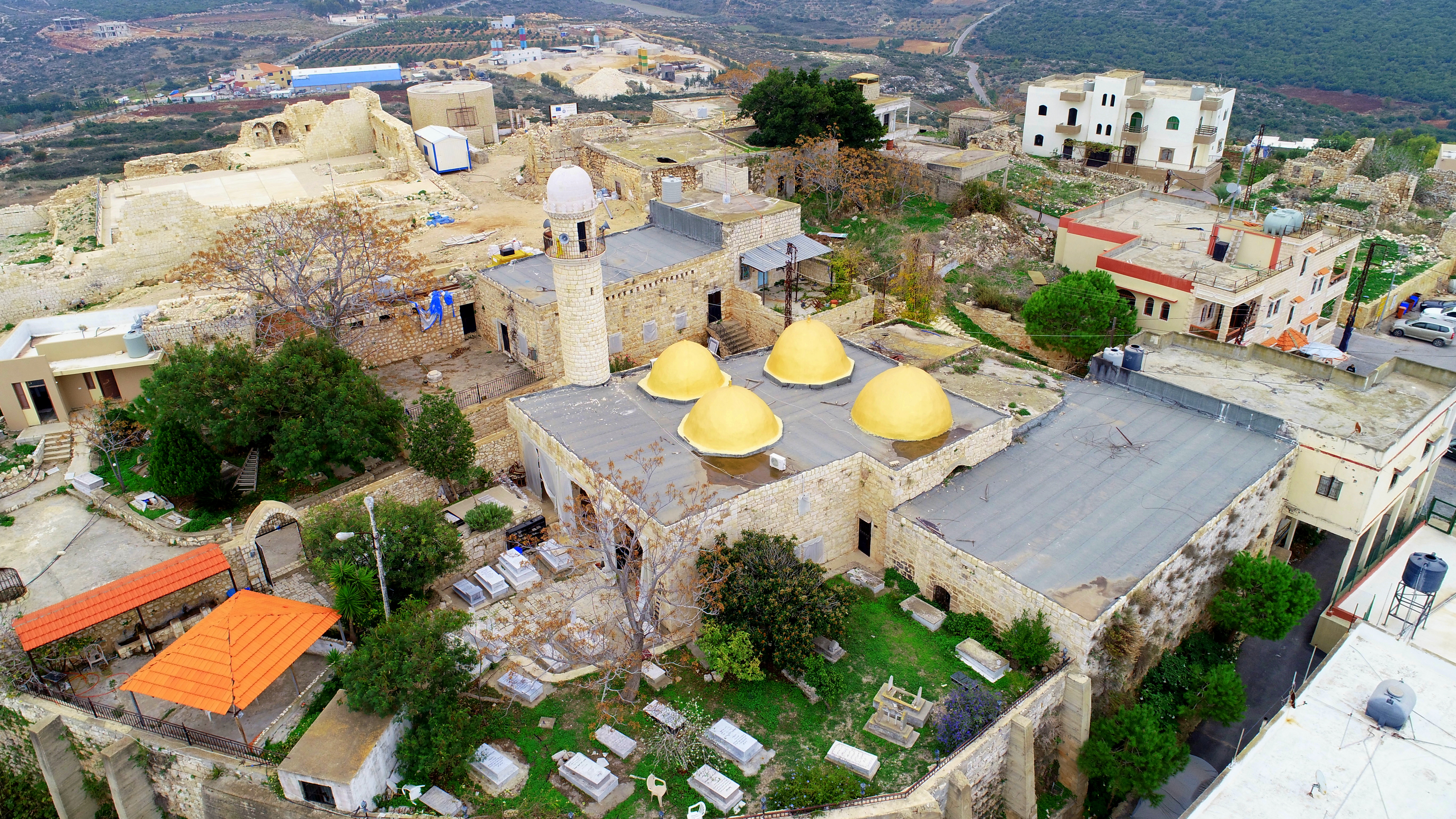
- 2018 aerial view of the shrine

- Location within Lebanon

General information
- Type: shrine, mosque, mausoleum
- Architectural style: Fatimid architecture
- Location: Shamaa, Lebanon
- Coordinates: 33.145592°N 35.208347°E

The Maqam Shamoun Al Safa (Arabic: مقام شمعون الصفا) is a Shi'ite Islamic shrine and mosque located in the Shamaa village, in Tyre District of the South Governorate, Lebanon. It contains a mausoleum believed to be that of Saint Peter, known in Muslim exegetical traditions as Sham'un as-Safa (Simon Cephas). The shrine was built or renovated by the Fatimids in 1097.

On 15 November 2024, the shrine was heavily damaged during the 2024 Israeli invasion of Lebanon.

== History ==
=== Burial of Simon Peter ===
Local tradition among Shiites holds that Simon Peter was buried in an area proximate to modern-day Tyre. This contrasts with mainstream Christian belief that Simon Peter was buried in the mausoleum underneath the St. Peter's Basilica in the Vatican. Modern signage outside of the shrine and surrounding areas claims that the grave within the shrine dates to the 1st century CE.

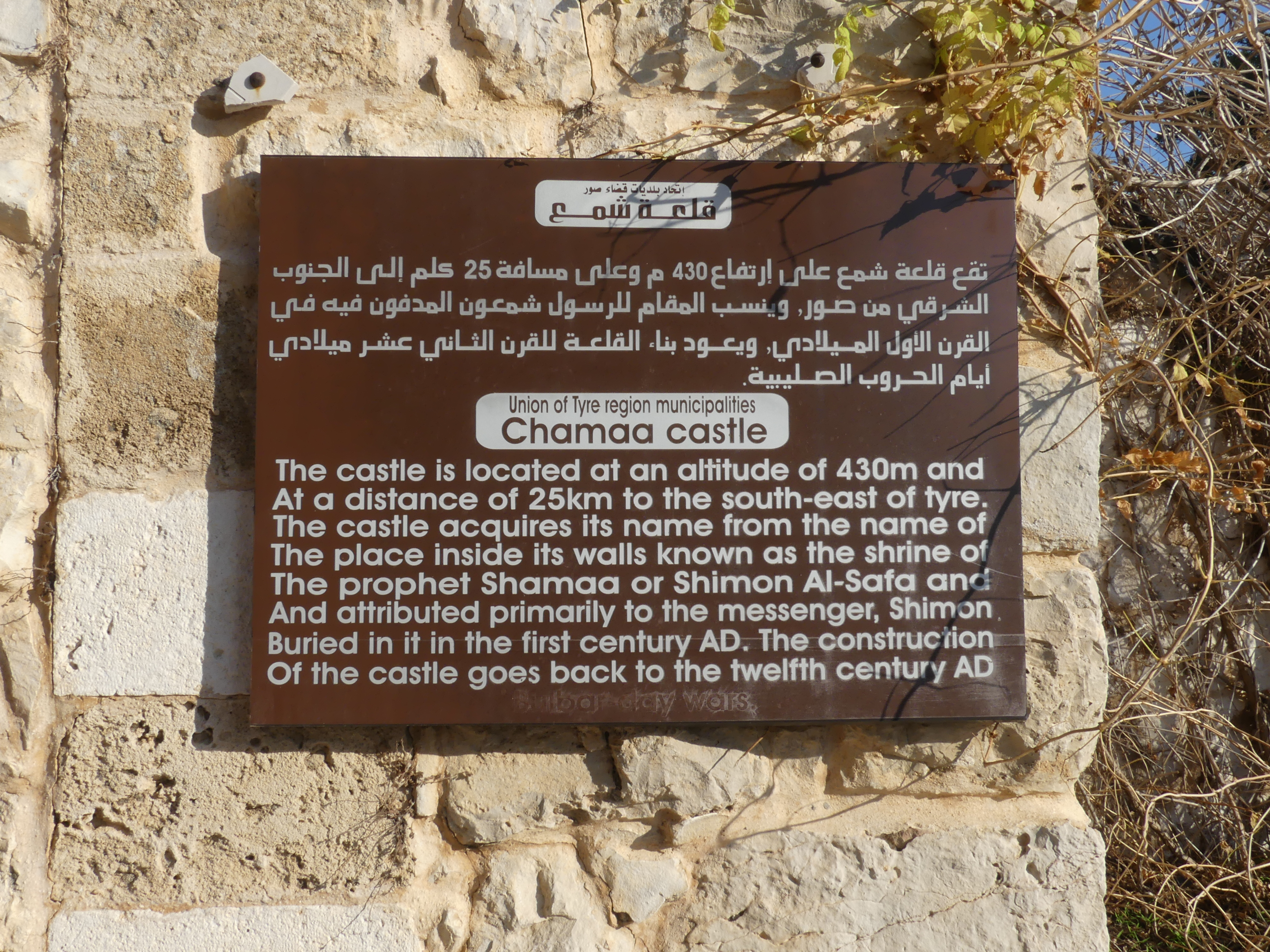
An information board outside Shamaa Citadel, indicating the shrine's supposed history dates back to the 1st century.

=== History of the shrine ===
Archaeological excavations indicate that some of the building material used in the shrine dated back to the 1st century CE, and one of the rooms may have been a Christian chapel.

The current shrine was built by the Fatimids emirs of Lebanon in 1097, based on an inscription inside of the shrine. The inscription at the minaret reads:

This blessed place was overseen .... in the year 490 (1097 CE)

The shrine was partially damaged by the Crusaders in 1124 after the fall of Tyre during the First Crusade, but was subsequently restored during the Mamluk period. Within the shrine's vicinity, an adjacent prayer room was built by Sheikh Hussein Khatoun, recorded in an inscription in the year 1100 AH (1688 CE). The shrine was also visited by Shia scholar and faqīh Yusuf al-Bahrani some time after 1750.

The shrine was damaged in 2006 Lebanon War but was fully restored after the end of the war. In 2019, it was reported that the site was a major religious destination in Lebanon for Shiite pilgrims.

The shrine was heavily damaged by shelling on 15 November 2024 by the IDF during the 2024 Israeli invasion of Lebanon. Videos of the shrine circulated online after 26 November ceasefire, showing the large amount of damage taken to the shrine and the grave appearing to have been looted.

== Gallery ==
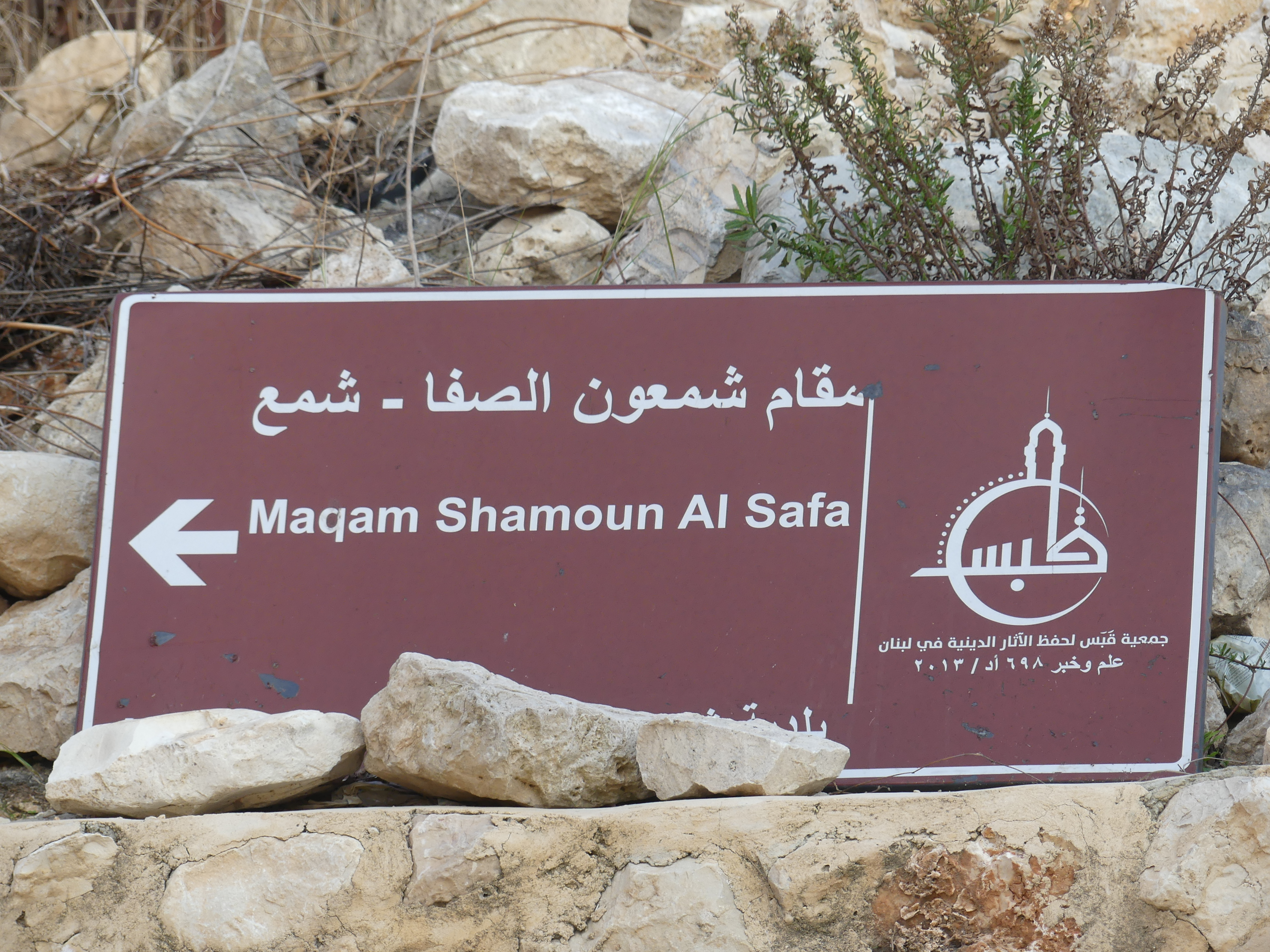
Signboard near the shrine

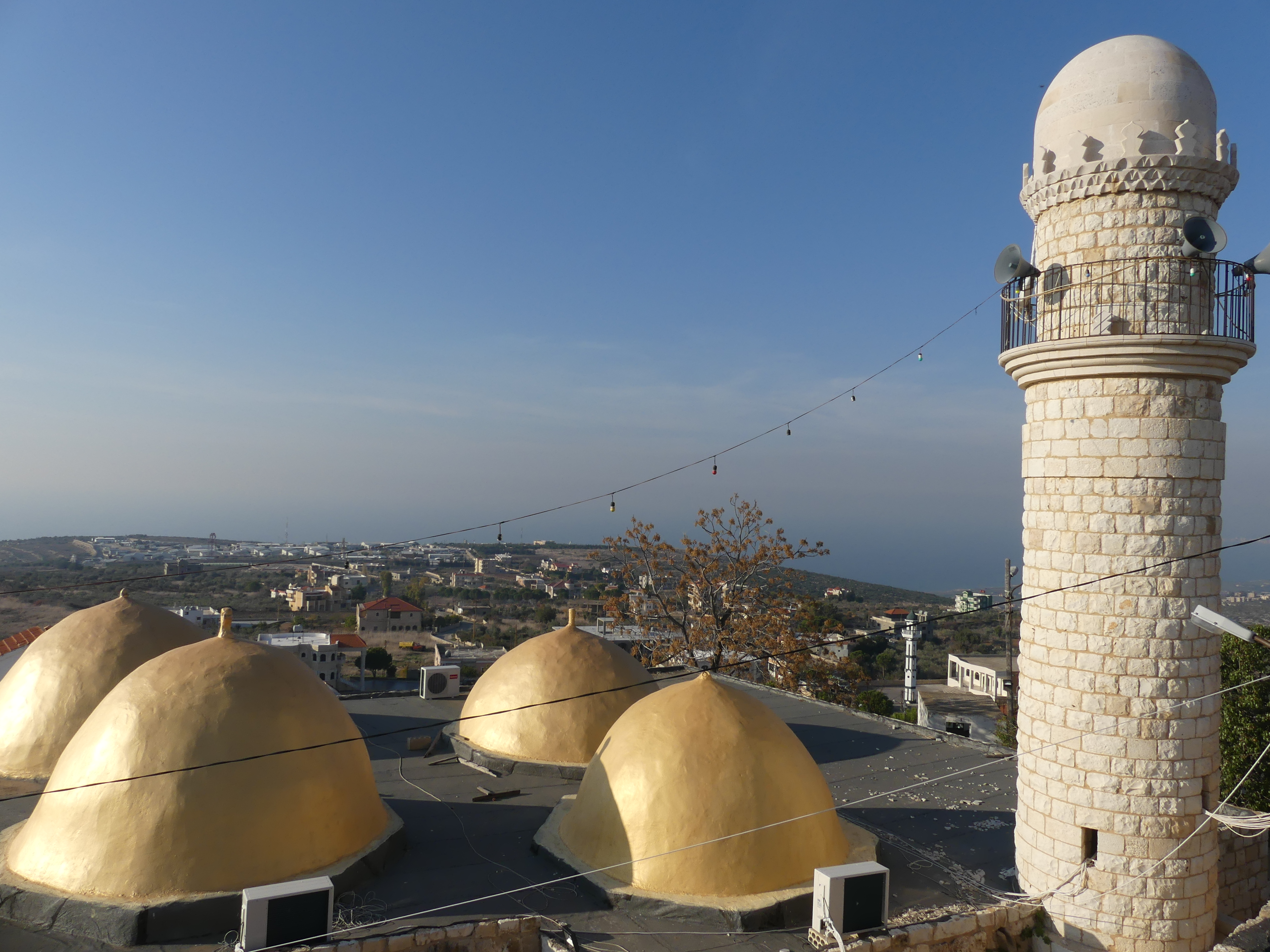
Domes and minaret

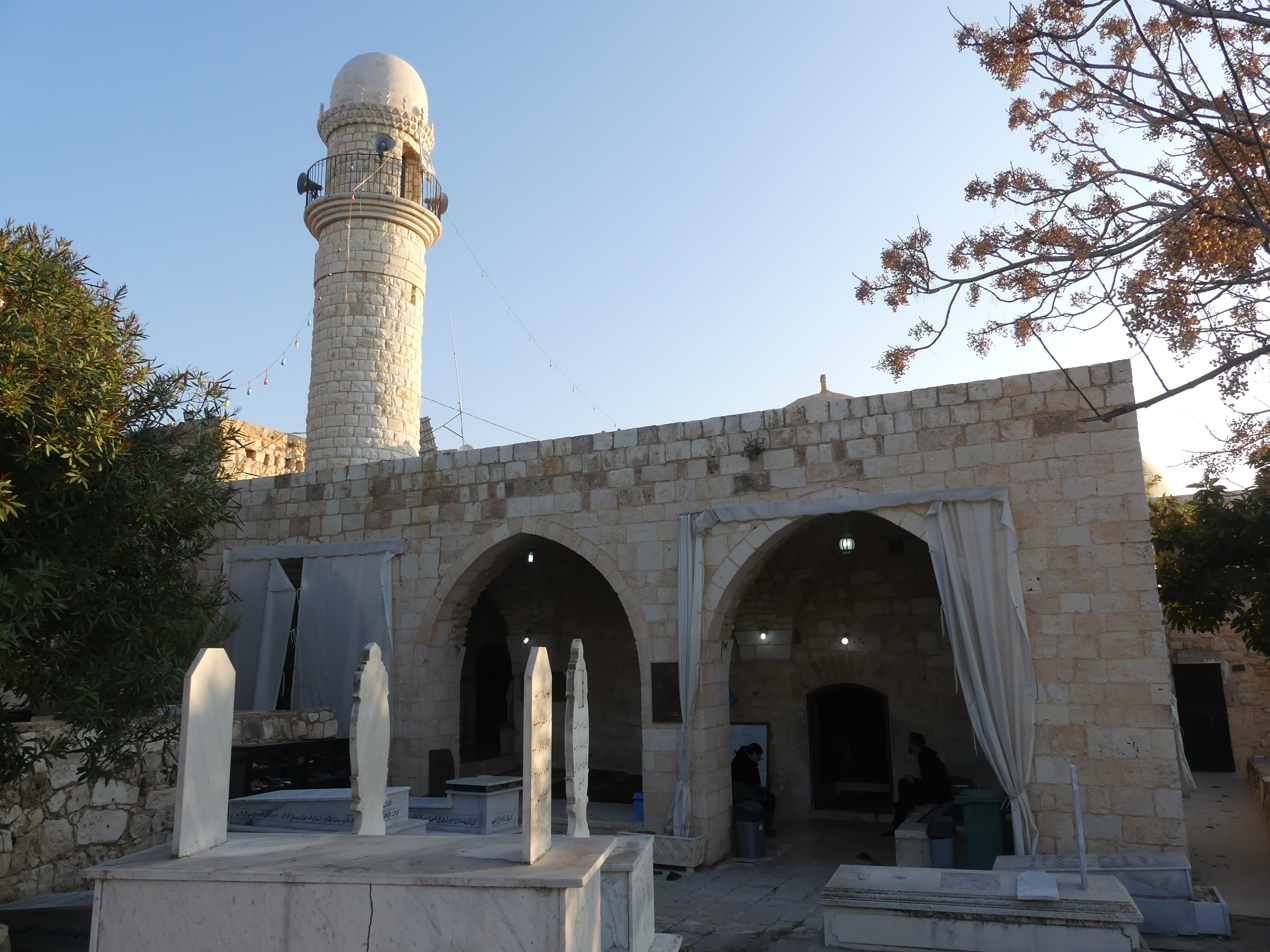
Cemetery in courtyard, the tombstones mostly read "Safi ad-Din"

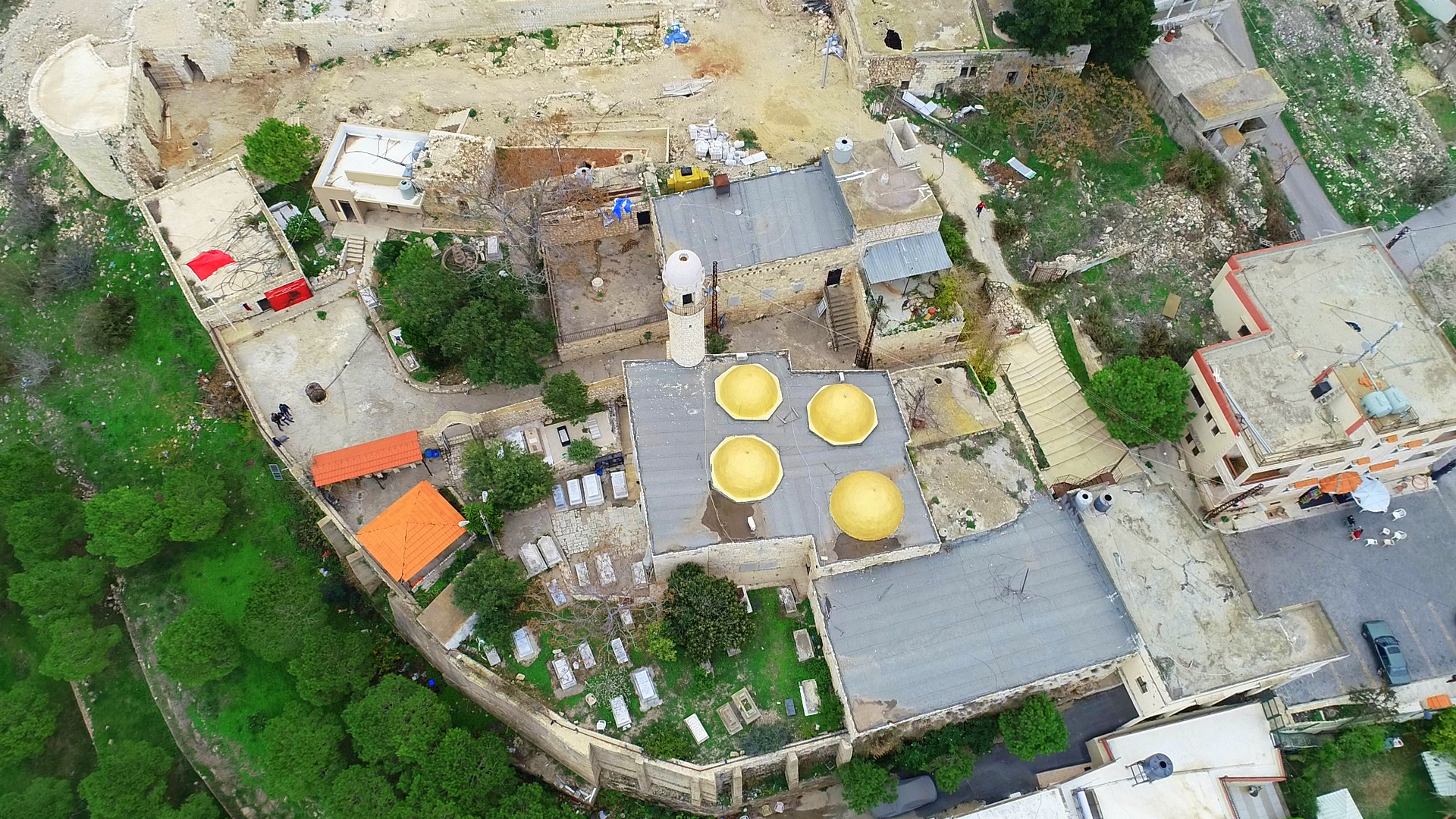
Aerial view of shrine

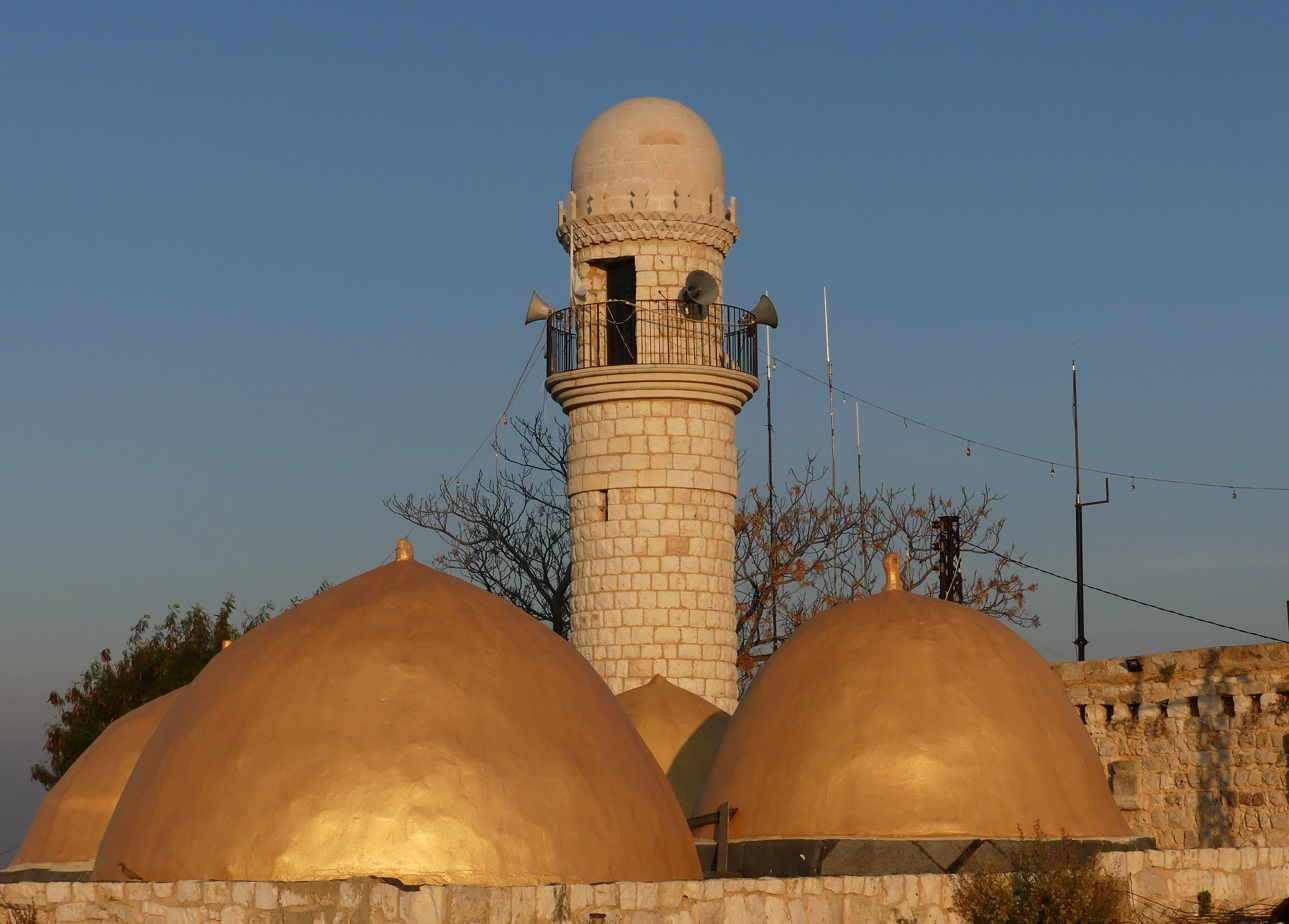
Evening view of domes and minaret from front

== See also ==
- Peter in Islam
