= Tell el-Burak =

Archaeological site in Lebanon

- تل البرك (Arabic)
- Location within Lebanon Location within Near East
- 33.482388°N 35.322636°E
- Cultures: Phoenician
- Location: Brak El Tall, South Lebanon

Site notes
- Excavation dates: 1998; 2004; 2020
- Condition: Ruined

Tell el-Burak is an archaeological site located near the southern coast of Lebanon. It served as an agricultural production center between 725 and 350 BCE. The area has been studied by the American University of Beirut and the University of Tübingen since 1998. These excavations have revealed three major periods of occupations on the tell: first in the Middle Bronze Age, then during the Iron Age, and lastly during the Ottoman Period.

== Excavations ==
The German-Lebanese team of archaeologists had conducted most of the excavations of Tell el-Burak by 2011, and the study and analysis of the site is ongoing.

During the 2024 Israeli invasion of Lebanon, UNESCO gave enhanced protection to 34 cultural sites in Lebanon, including Tell el-Burak, in attempt to safeguard them from damage.

The tell stands prominently amidst agricultural lands on a strip of plain fronted by the Mediterranean Sea and backed by a range of hills. The plain, a well-watered zone, is home to a large agricultural area where fruit trees currently predominate. The conical, purpose-built tell towers above the plain approximately 19 meters and is readily visible from both land and sea. From the top of mound, Sidon can be seen to the north and to the south, rising above Ras el-Qantara, the tell of the Late Bronze Age/Phoenician city of Sarepta can be seen.

In 2004, an underwater archaeological survey was conducted in the area of the tell by the archaeologist Ralph K. Pedersen. It indicated that there was no harbour nor good anchorage near the site.

=== Middle Bronze Age ===
During the earliest Middle Bronze Age stage, the mound was built as part of a defensive structure, serving as the base for a fortress on its top. It appears to be the first Middle Bronze Age fortified palace so far discovered in Lebanon. The fortress was built with mudbricks.

==== "Kingdom of Sidon" ====
According to archaeologists, Tell el-Burak excavations have helped significantly to clarify the history of the nearby Sidon during the Middle Bronze Age. Previously, there was a gap in this history from the end of the Early Bronze Age until the middle of the 2nd millennium BC, when Sidon is first mentioned in the historical texts. Sidon was the big power centre at that time, that controlled significant territory. So there appears to have been the Kingdom of Sidon that controlled el-Burak, and other areas.

==== Oldest wall paintings ====
The biggest room, measuring 7 by 14 meters, contained wall paintings that demonstrated the area's ties to Egypt at the time, as early as 1900 BCE. Egyptian blue, a pigment extremely rare in the natural world yet produced and used in Egypt since the 3rd millennium BCE, was utilized in the paintings. Bertsch, an archaeologist working on the site excavations, stated the paintings may have even been painted directly by Egyptian artists.

Dr. Hélène Sader, professor at the American University of Beirut, believes that the site casts considerable light on the early history and development of the ‘’fresco’’ paintings in the entire Mediterranean, including the famous wall paintings of Minoan Crete.

"According to Dr. Sader, the analysis of the painting technique revealed the presence of the oldest forerunner of fresco painting as the preliminary drawings were applied on the still wet plaster and combined with it. “The fresco painting technique may have originated and developed in the Levant long before its use in the later Minoan-Aegean paintings, namely on the island of Crete” she said."

=== Late Bronze Age ===
There is no apparent occupation in the intervening Late Bronze Age, as the site was seemingly abandoned in favor of Sarepta, four kilometers to the south.

=== Iron Age ===
In the Iron Age, Tell el-Burak was home to a settlement that was prosperous and peaceful, as seen in its defenselessness and fine architecture.

In September 2020, a winepress was discovered at Tell el-Burak, dating back to the seventh-century BCE.

== See also ==
- Cities of the ancient Near East
