= Saint Louis Castle =

Castle of Saint Louis
- Sidon, Lebanon
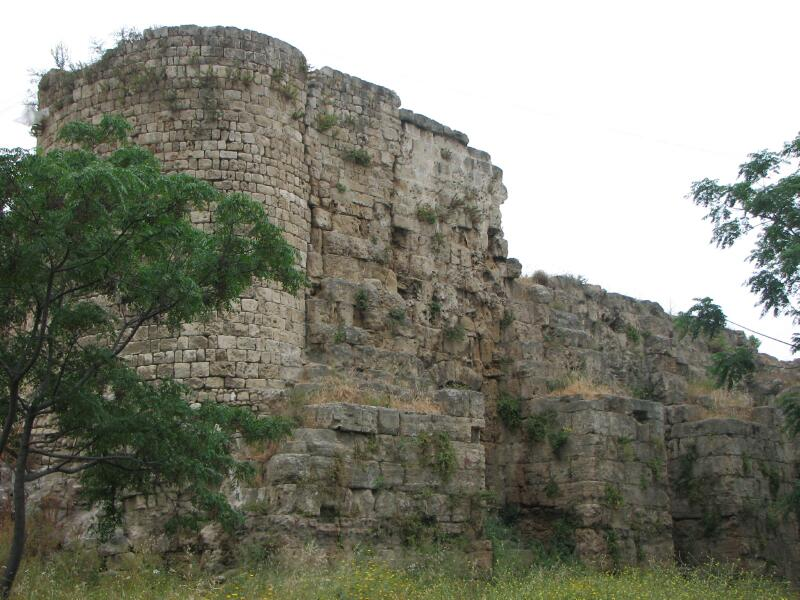
- Overgrown ruins of the Castle of St. Louis

Site information
- Type: Castle
- Open to the public: Yes
- Condition: Ruins

Location
- Location within Lebanon
- Coordinates: 33°33′36.8″N 35°22′14.4″E

Site history
- Built: 10th – 17th centuries
- Built by: Fatimid Caliphate (original fortress); Crusaders (present castle)

The Castle of Saint Louis (Arabic: قلعة القديس لويس, romanized: Qalʻat al-Qiddīs Luwīs), also known as Qalaat al Muizz (Arabic: قلعة المعز) or the Land Castle, is a ruined castle in Sidon, Lebanon. It was built in 1254 by French crusaders on the site of an earlier Fatimid fortress and was altered a number of times until the 17th century.

== History ==
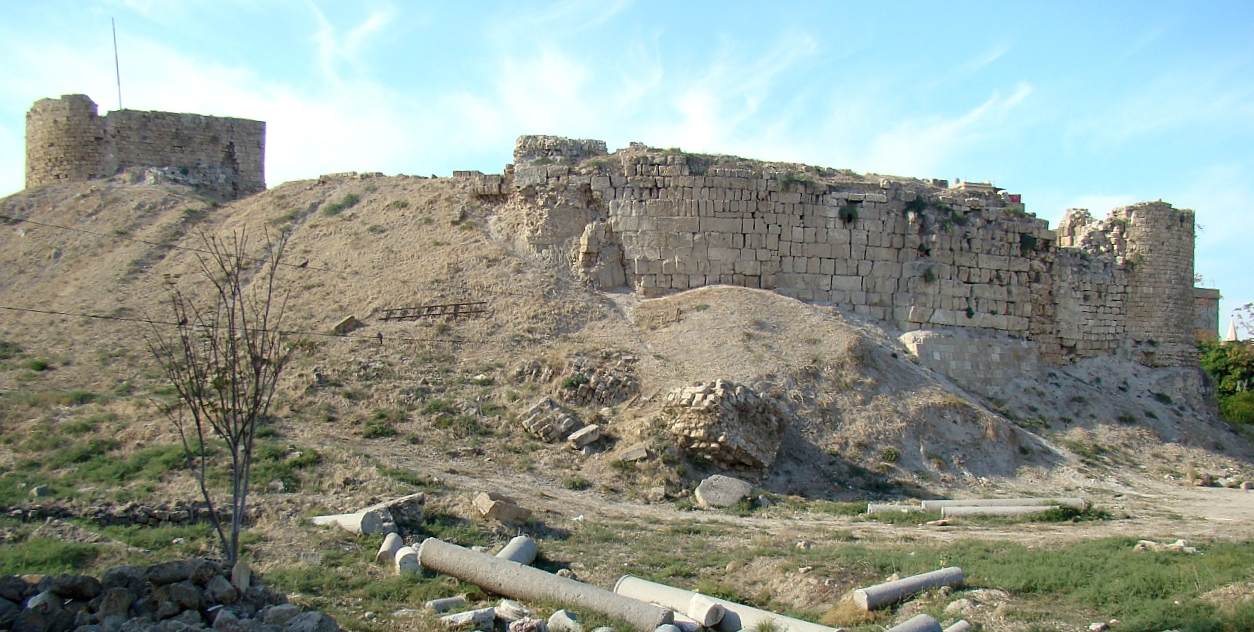
St. Louis Castle on the site of the acropolis

=== Ancient acropolis ===
The site now occupied by the Castle of St. Louis is said to have been the acropolis of the ancient city. Some remains of this acropolis still exist, including a theater.

=== Early Muslim period ===
The ancient citadel was probably completely demolished and then rebuilt by the Arabs.

The site became a fortress in the 10th century, when Fatimid Caliph Al-Mu'izz li-Din Allah fortified it and gave it the name Qalaat al Muizz.

=== Crusader castle ===
The castle as it is today was built in 1254 by crusaders during the Frankish occupation of Sidon. The French king, Louis IX, better known as St. Louis, appears to have spent a long time at the castle, and this is perhaps why the site is named after him. A mass grave from the period was discovered by archaeologists in 2021.

=== Ayyubid, Mamluk and Ottoman periods ===
When the Arabs reoccupied the city, the castle was restored. It was damaged later on by the Mamluks, and was extensively rebuilt by Fakhr-al-Din II in the 17th century. The castle was then looted a number of times, leaving the structure in ruins. Part of the castle collapsed during the end of the Ottoman era.

=== 20th and 21st centuries ===
The castle served as a shelter for refugees of the 1948 Palestinian expulsion and flight. It was further damaged by Israeli shelling. Plans are being made to restore the castle.

== Murex Hill ==
To the south of the citadel is a mound of debris called Murex Hill. A talus of crushed shells of murex shells (correctly, specimens of Bolinus brandaris and Hexaplex trunculus) along the western slope can still be seen. This artificial mound (100 m long and 50 m high) was formed by the accumulation of refuse from the purple dye factories of Phoenician times. Mosaic tiling at the top of the mound suggests that Roman buildings were erected there when the area was no longer used as the city's dumping ground. Part of the hill today is covered by the cemetery of the Shia Muslim community of Sidon.

== See also ==
- List of Crusader castles
