= El Bizri family =

Levantine Noble Family

Āl al-Bizrī آل البزري
- Sayyid Hashemite
- Parent family: Banu al-Husayn of Banu Hashim
- Country: Ottoman Empire
- Current region: Lebanon; Syria; Palestine; Jordan
- Origin: Sidon, Lebanon
- Founder: Sayyid Abd Allah al-Bizri al-Sidawi
- Traditions: Sunni Hanafism; Ash'arism

The El-Bizri (Al-Bizri, Bizri) family (Arabic: البزري, romanized: al-Bizrī) is an Arab Levantine noble family of Hashemite origin. Historically, its members settled in Sidon, Lebanon with a large branch also growing in Damascus, Syria, and a much smaller presence in Acre, mainly in pre-1948 Palestine.

== Origin ==
Traditionalist Arab/Levantine genealogists (nuqaba’ Sayda wa Dimashq) who established the family-tree noted that the Al-Bizri descent comes from the lineage of the Imam Husayn ibn Ali as 'Sherifs' (Ashraf).

Following Arab clan lineages, which are recorded as well as transmitted orally, the Al-Bizri line is traced back to the grandfather of the family al-Siyyid ‘Abd’Allah al-Bizri al-Sidawi, who is linked to the descendants of al-Siyyid Ja’far al-Tawwab al-Rabhi, known as ¨Abi al-Banin¨ جعفر بن علي الهادي, who is the son of al-Imam Ali al-Hadi. (His grandfather is al-Imam Muhammad al-Jawwad, ibn al-Imam ‘Ali al-Rida, ibn al-Imam Musa al-Kazim, ibn al-Imam Ja’far al-Sadiq, ibn al-Imam Muhammad al-Baqir, ibn al-Imam ‘Ali Zayn al-‘Abidin, ibn al-Imam Husayn).

The Al-Bizri family is a bearer of the historical titles ‘Husayni’ and ‘Ridwi’ (in a respective attribution of their lineage to Imam al-Husayn and Imam al-Rida). Although being Ashraf who descend from the Husayni and Ridwi line, they are not Shi’a and for a long time they have been associated with the Sunni Hanafi tradition in Islam, perhaps under influences from the Ottoman era in the Levant. The ancient lineage of the family is safeguarded in the records of its elders, and the clerics who search for genealogies (ansab al-ashraf) confirmed the old family-tree manuscript that is traced on papyrus. Many of the young members of the Al-Bizri family are not aware of their Arabian lineage, let alone that tradition links their clan history with the descendants from the tree of the Imam al-Husayn bin 'Ali, or that they have migrated historically from the eastern regions of the Fertile Crescent to Damascus and the Lebanese coast.

== Modern times ==
In modern times, the Al-Bizri family contributed to the social, economic, and political life in Sidon and Damascus in the wider Levantine context. Their role from the late Ottoman period, at the end of the nineteenth century, then throughout the forming of the greater Lebanon and its history till the end of the twentieth century (especially in Sidon) was notable. This was mainly felt on the political scene. They were mainly civil servants, notaries, merchants, army officers, and muftis in the late Ottoman era, and had a bond in marriage with a branch of the famed Abaza clan that came from Egypt to settle in Sidon at the end of the nineteenth century.

== Politics ==
This sectarian and demographic division rose to the surface during the Lebanese Civil War, when armed clashes erupted between the pro-Palestinian Sunni Muslims and the anti-Palestinian Christians. The clashes ended with the surrender of the Christian front, and the Christians were forced to move to east Beirut. After the war ended in 1990, the Christians have gradually returned to their hometowns.

The local politics of Sidon in the 20th century was mainly dominated up till the 1980s by allegiances around two main families, the Al-Bizri and Saad. The Al-Bizri politicians were known for their business connections, close ties with eminent Lebanese and Levantine leaders, and their bent on serving the Lebanese state as government ministers, officials, and mayors. The Saad politicians tended to be populist and became engaged in violent protests in the 1940s, 1950s and then during the Lebanese civil war as Nasserites (populist followers of Nasser in Lebanon). The local political conflict between these two families was always resolved through amicable means and ties of kinship. Their hold over the political aspects of the city was similar to that of Mediterranean families in Sicily or to being also influenced by the ties of Arab families, clans, and tribes in traditionalist forms. The most notable figures of the Al-Bizri family in the first half of the 20th century were: Ahmad El-Bizri (born 1899), Salah El-Bizri, Eizeddine El-Bizri (commonly known as Eizzo), and Anwar El-Bizri (born 1910). These four brothers were businessmen and politicians who dominated the political life of the city up till the late 1940s, using traditional inherited forms of governance since Ottoman times. With intelligence and strength, they maintained their power for over 50 years. It is from their ranks that Maarouf Saad started his public life, and their close cousins, Nazih El-Bizri, Amin El-Bizri, and Fouad El-Bizri became the next generation of politicians and statesmen in Lebanon; holding positions as ministers and members of parliament. The Al-Bizri and the Saad political practices were bent on social justice and on local service in public affairs. The Al-Bizri were since the Ottoman rule bent on serving the state, and this continued with their loyalty and support to the successive governments of Lebanon since the times of independence. They also helped eminent politicians and statesmen of Sidonian descent such as Prime Ministers Riad Solh, Taki El-Din Solh, and Rashid Solh, they also gave their support to former Prime Minister Saab Salam, father of the current Lebanese prime minister, Tamam Salam. The presence of the Al-Bizris was at times intimidating on the local scene, but they were also known for their goodwill and dignified public service. The Saad family developed their links with Nasserism in the 1950s and engaged in the uprising and armed protest of 1958 against the government of the Lebanese President Chamoun. They also became involved in the civil war as part of the left-wing politics of Lebanon (Al-Haraka al-Wataniyya) with PLO connections, and they actively contributed to resisting the Israeli occupation after 1982. They remained populist in their politics and focused on the grassroots, while the Al-Bizri were generally appealing to the middle and upper classes. In the middle 1980s, the Hariri family started to rise to prominence and it became the most influential in Sidon in political and financial terms, even though the presence of the Saad and the Al-Bizri in local politics remained significant at the level of visibility and activism. The politics of Sidon is similar to that of the traditional old cities of the Levant in the sense of being family-based. In broad terms, one could say that the Al-Bizri family had an influence since Ottoman times, and then most significantly across almost the entirety of the 20th century. It was local in impact at first, but then the members of this family became influential within the Lebanese state and institutions, and they supported the Solh family that had successive Prime Ministers and that moved its power base from Sidon to Beirut. The Saad family developed its original politics from within the sphere of influence of the Al-Bizri family and then became a power to reckon with on its own after 1948, and most powerfully in 1958, then in the civil war and up till today. Maarouf Saad, the leader of his family, and a local influential politician was assassinated on the eve of the Lebanese civil war in 1975. The Saads retained their populism and grassroots appeal and attracted a core of loyal adherents since the middle of the 20th century. While the Al-Bizri were Levantine in their Arabism (namely focused mainly on Bilad al-Shaam in regional politics), and the Solh being also similar to them in this, the Saad were leaning more towards a broader pan-Arabism (Nasserite, Libyan, and then Syrian). As for the Hariri family, they are regionally focused on Saudi orientations in politics. The Hariri family started to rise to political and economic prominence in the 1980s and became perhaps the most influential family in Lebanon by the middle 1990s. It is now one of the most organized in political terms and it follows modern forms of political practice through a large party (Future Movement) that cuts across various economic classes but that is usually seen as a Sunni political movement with regional weight due to its close ties with Saudi Arabia.

== Notable Members ==
The names of many notable members of the El-Bizri family in the twentieth century are listed on the Sidon Wikipedia webpage with additional Wiki-links and external references.

- Afif al-Bizri, a major field general in the Syrian army who was a key figure in shaping the Arab united republic in the Gamal Abdel Nasser era between Syria and Egypt.
- Dalal Al-Bizri, Lebanese researcher
- Nader El-Bizri, the philosopher and architect.
- Gamil El Bizri, mayor of Sidon from 1908 to 1910
- Mosbah El Bizri, mayor of Sidon from 1910–1914, and 1920–1922.
- Said El Bizri, mayor of Sidon from 1923–1933.
- The Four Brothers - Riad El Bizri's sons:
- Ahmad El Bizri, (Mayor of Sidon from 1937–1951, Member of Parliament from 1951–1953
- Hisham Bizri, Lebanese-American filmmaker
- Dr. Nazih El Bizri, mayor of Sidon from 1952–1959, Lebanese Parliament Deputy from 1953–1958 and 1972–1992. Lebanese Minister of Health and Minister of Social Affairs from 1955–1956, 1972–1973, and 1980–1982.
- Fouad El Bizri, Lebanese Minister of Public works and Transportation and Ministry of Energy and Water from 1966–1968, Vice-chairman of the International Baalbeck Festival for decades, Chairman of the Social Welfare Institutions (Dar Al Aytam Al Islamiya) for decades.
- Amin El Bizri, Lebanese Minister of Public works and Transportation from 1976–1979.
- Dr. Abdel Rahman El Bizri, mayor of Sidon from 2004–2010, Lebanese Parliament Deputy from 2022.
- Fayez Salah El Bizri, President of Makassed Islamic Charitable Society.
- Abdullah Albizri, Associate Professor, Information Management and Business Analytics, Feliciano School of Business
