= Sidon =

Capital city of South Governorate, Lebanon

Sidon صيدا
- City
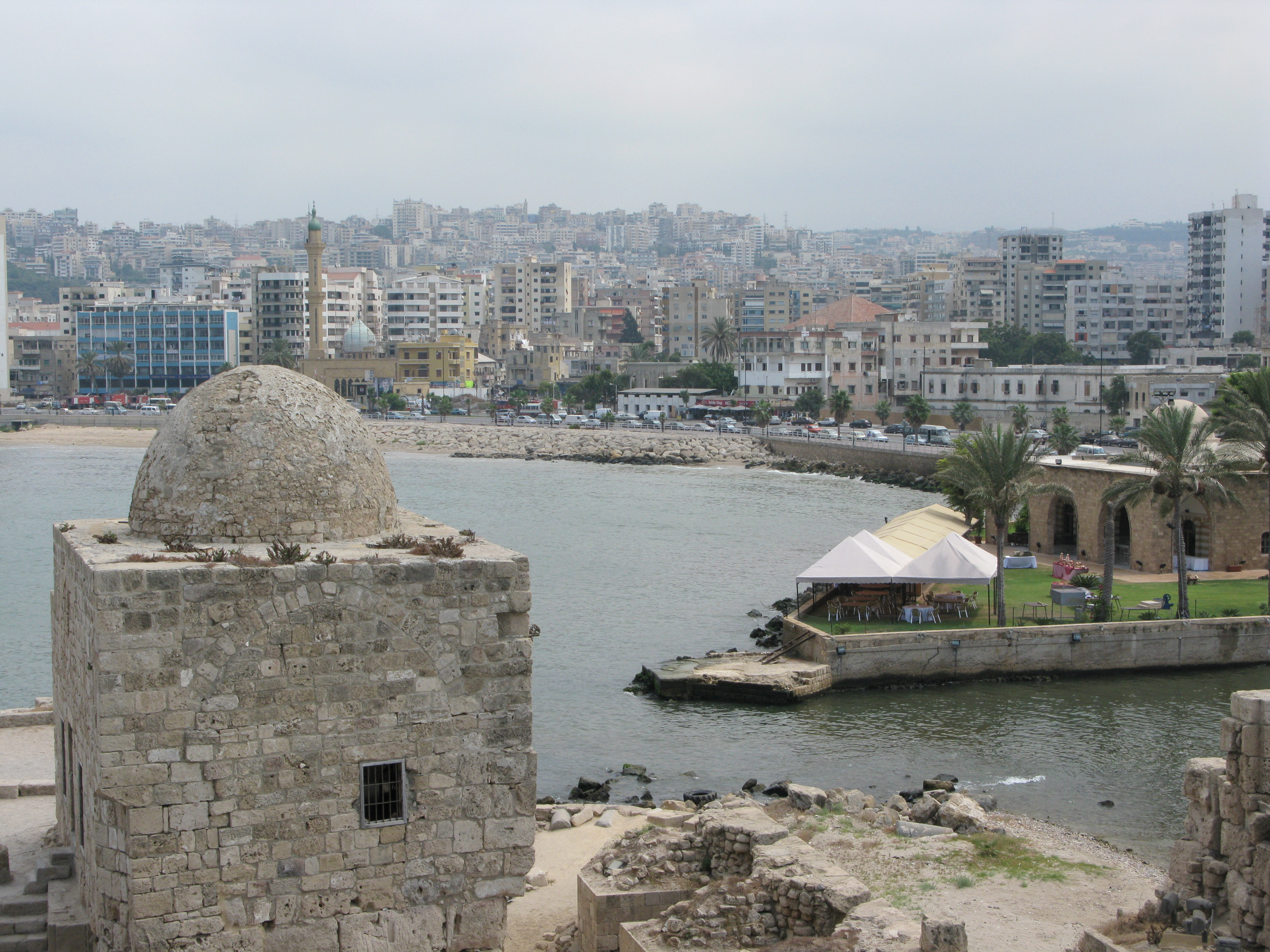
- Saida's Sea Castle

- Location in Lebanon Sidon (West and Central Asia)
- Coordinates: 33°33′38″N 35°22′33″E
- Country: Lebanon
- Governorate: South Governorate
- District: Saida District
- Settled: 3rd millennium BC

Government
  - Mayor: Mustafa al-Hijazi (Independent)

Area
  - City: 3.02 sq mi (7.82 km^{2})
  - Metro: 9.7 sq mi (25 km^{2})

Population
  - City: ~80,000
  - Metro: ~266,000
- Time zone: UTC+2 (EET)
  - Summer (DST): UTC+3 (EEST)
- Postal code: 1600
- Area code: 07

Sidon (/ˈsaɪdən/ SY-dən), or Saida (/ˈsaɪdə, ˈsɑːɪdə/ SY-də, SAH-id-ə; Arabic: صيدا, romanized: Ṣaydā), is the third-largest city in Lebanon. It is located on the Mediterranean coast in the South Governorate, of which it is the capital. Tyre, to the south, and the Lebanese capital of Beirut, to the north, are each about 40 kilometres (25 miles) away. Sidon has a population of about 80,000 within the city limits, while its metropolitan area has more than a quarter-million inhabitants.

== Etymology ==
I10 Z4 D46 V1 N35 G1 T14 N25
ḏjdwnꜣ
in hieroglyphs
Era: New Kingdom
(1550–1069 BC)

I10 D46 D46 V1 N35 G1 T14 N25 O49
ḏddwnꜣ
in hieroglyphs

The Phoenician name Ṣīdūn (𐤑𐤃𐤍, ṣdn) probably meant "fishery" or "fishing town". It is mentioned in Papyrus Anastasi I as ḏjdwnꜣ. It appears in Biblical Hebrew as Ṣīḏōn (Hebrew: צִידוֹן) and in Syriac as Ṣidon (ܨܝܕܘܢ). This was Hellenised as Sidṓn (Ancient Greek: Σιδών), which was Latinised as Sidon and entered English in this form. The name appears in Classical Arabic as Ṣaydūn (صَيْدونْ) and in Modern Arabic as Ṣaydā (صَيْدَا).

As a Roman colony, it was renamed Colonia Aurelia Pia Sidon to honour its imperial sponsor.

During the Crusades, Sidon was known in Latin as Sagittus and in Old French as Saete, Sayette or Sagette.

In the Book of Genesis, Sidon was the first-born son of Canaan, who was a son of Ham, making Sidon a great-grandson of Noah.

== History ==
In antiquity, Sidon was a significant Phoenician city. It was nestled on a mainland promontory and had two harbors. Throughout ancient history, Sidon had many conquerors: Assyrians, Babylonians, Egyptians, Persians, Greeks, and finally Romans. Under Persian rule, it eclipsed Tyre to become the paramount city in Phoenicia. In the New Testament era, Herod the Great visited Sidon. Both Jesus and Saint Paul are said to have visited it, too (see Biblical Sidon below). The city was eventually conquered by the Arabs and then by the Ottoman Turks.

=== Prehistory ===
Sidon has been inhabited since very early in prehistory. The archaeological site of Sidon II shows a lithic assemblage dating to the Acheulean, whilst finds at Sidon III include a Heavy Neolithic assemblage suggested to date just prior to the invention of pottery.

=== Middle Bronze ===
==== Middle Bronze IIA ====
In late MB IIA, Sidon Level 4 became an important port trading with Egypt (late 12th and early 13th dynasties).

=== Late Bronze ===
==== Late Bronze II ====
Amarna period. Around 1350 BC, Sidon was part of the Egyptian Empire and ruled by Zimredda of Sidon. During the Amarna Period, Egypt went into decline, leading to uprising and turmoil in the Levant. There was rivalry between Lebanese coastal city-states fighting for dominance, with Abimilku of Tyre in the south, and Rib-Hadda of Byblos in the north. Byblos became significantly weakened as the dominant city on the Lebanese coast. Further north, the Akkar Plain rebelled and became the kingdom of Amurru with Hittite support. The Mitanni Empire, an ally of the Egyptians, had dominated Syria but now fell apart due to the military campaigns of Suppiluliuma I of Hatti. Tutankhamun and his general Horemheb scrambled to keep Egyptian control over southern Levant, as the Hittites became overlords in the north.

The oldest testimony documenting words in the Phoenician language of Sidon, is also from this period. The Book of Deuteronomy (3, 9) reads: "the Sidonians call Hermon Sirion". In other words: Mount Hermon was called "Sirion", in (the Phoenician language of) Sidon.

=== Iron Age ===
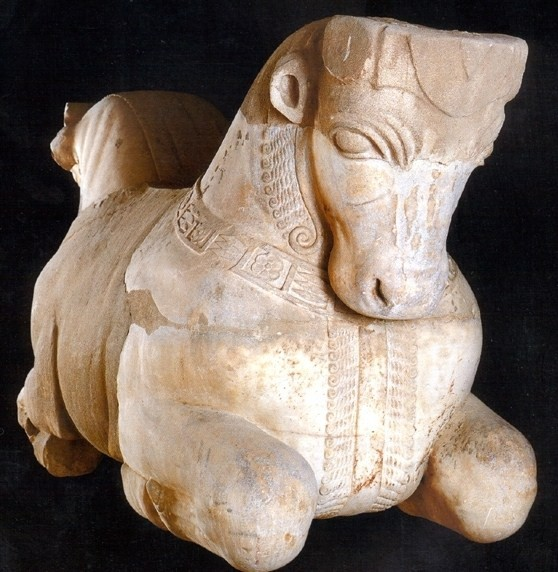
Persian style bull protome found in Sidon gives testimony of the Achaemenid rule and influence. Marble, 5th century BC

Sidon was one of the most important Phoenician cities, and it may have been the oldest. From there and other ports, a great Mediterranean commercial empire was founded. Homer praised the skill of its craftsmen in producing glass, purple dyes, and its women's skill at the art of embroidery. It was also from here that a colonising party went to found the city of Tyre. Tyre also grew into a great city, and in subsequent years there was competition between the two, each claiming to be the metropolis ('Mother City') of Phoenicia.

During the Phoenician era, Sidon thrived on two pivotal industries: glass manufacturing and purple dye production. The city's glass production operated on an extensive scale, while the manufacturing of purple dye held nearly equal importance. The magnitude of Sidon's purple dye production was evident through a considerable mound of discarded Murex trunculus shells discovered near the southern harbor. These shells were broken to extract the precious pigment, so rare that it became synonymous with royalty.

In AD 1855, the sarcophagus of King Eshmun’azar II was discovered. From a Phoenician inscription on its lid, it appears that he was a "king of the Sidonians," probably in the 5th century BC, and that his mother was a priestess of ‘Ashtart, "the goddess of the Sidonians." In this inscription the gods Eshmun and Ba‘al Sidon 'Lord of Sidon' (who may or may not be the same) are mentioned as chief gods of the Sidonians. ‘Ashtart is entitled ‘Ashtart-Shem-Ba‘al, '‘Ashtart the name of the Lord', a title also found in an Ugaritic text.

Nebuchadnezzar II subjugated the city to be part of the Neo-Babylonian Empire. Sidon's navy played a significant role in the Battle of Salamis in 480 BC, aligning with the Persian fleet against the Greeks. From the mid-fifth century BC onward, warships became a prominent feature on the city's coinage. At the end of the Persian era, in 351 BC, Phoenicia was invaded by Artaxerxes III.

=== Persian and Hellenistic periods ===
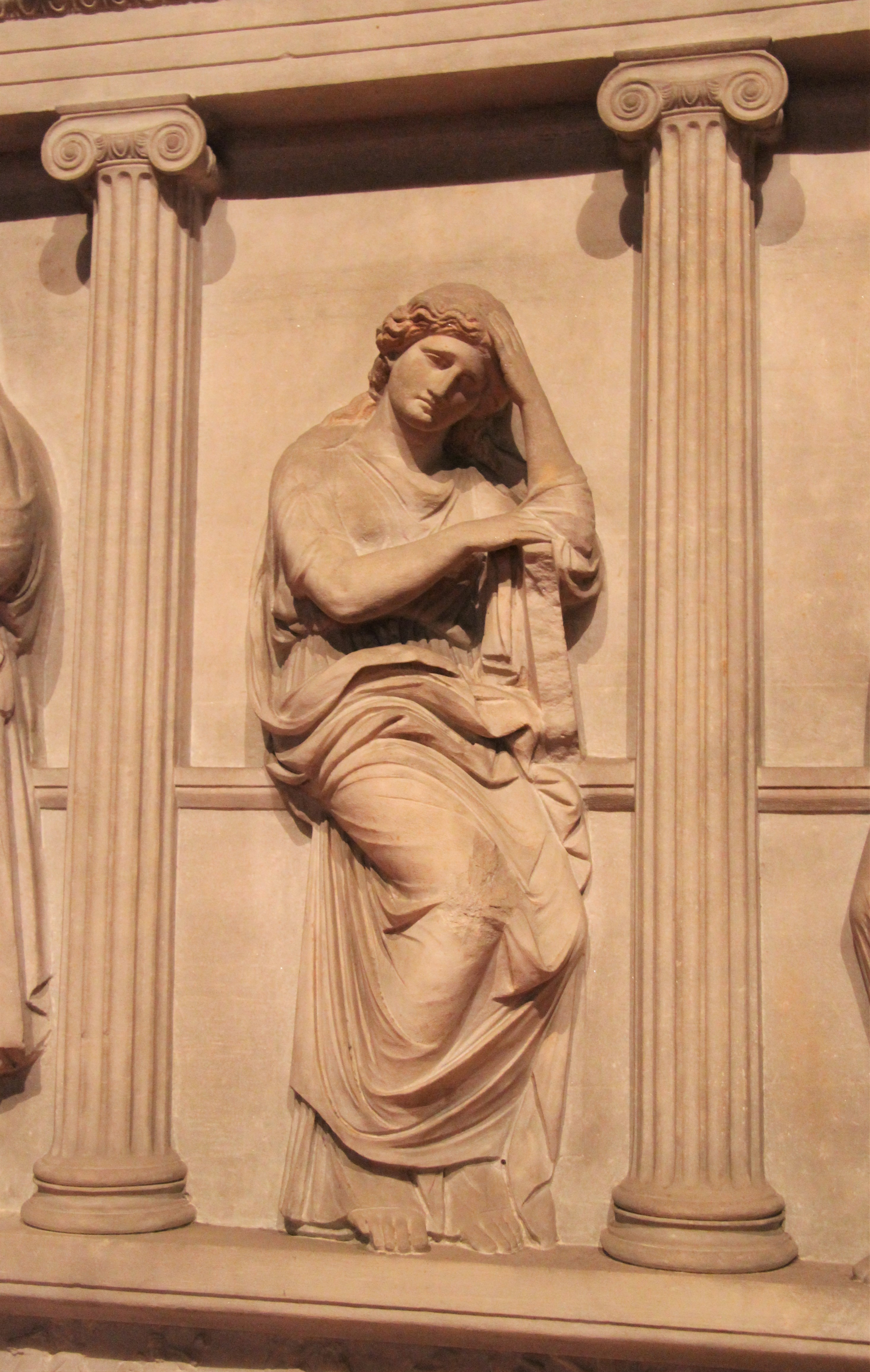
Tomb of the Mourning Women, Hellenistic necropolis of Sidon, now in the Istanbul Archaeology Museums

Like other Phoenician city-states, Sidon suffered from a succession of conquerors, first by the Achaemenid Empire in the 6th century BC, ending with its occupation by Alexander the Great in 333 BC, and the start of the Hellenistic period of Sidon's history. The Persian influence seems to have been profound, as is observed in the change of the architectural style of the city. In exchange for supporting his conquest of Egypt, King Cambyses II of Persia awarded Sidon with the territories of Dor, Joppa, and the Plain of Sharon. (Note: See lines 18–20 of the Eshmunazar II sarchophagus inscription.) (Note: The territories of the Phoenician cities could be discontiguous: thus, the lands and the cities of Dor and Joppa belonging to the Sidonians were separated from Sidon by the city of Tyre.)

Under the Diadochi or successors of Alexander, it enjoyed relative autonomy and organised games and competitions in which the greatest athletes of the region participated. In the Hellenistic period necropolis of Sidon, important finds such as the Alexander Sarcophagus (likely the tomb of King Abdalonymus rather than Alexander), the Lycian tomb and the Sarcophagus of the Crying Women were discovered, which are now on display at the Archaeological Museum of Istanbul.

=== Roman period ===
When Sidon fell under Roman domination, it continued to mint its own silver coins. The city was embellished by Herod, king of Judaea, who built there a theatre. By the First Jewish–Roman War, Sidon sheltered enough Jews that local pagans hesitated to attack them during the broader massacre of Jews in Greco-Syrian towns in 66 CE, as documented by Josephus.

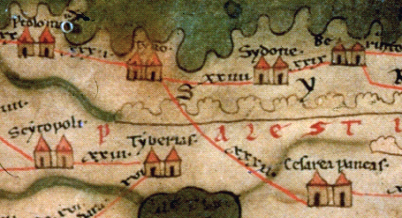
The Peutinger Table showing the location of Tyre and Sidon within the Roman Empire

The Romans built a theater and other major monuments in the city, and an underground Mithraeum was discovered. In the reign of Elagabalus, a Roman colony was established there. The Philogelos, a Greek-language joke book written circa the 4th century AD, features a series of jokes about Sidonians, who are stereotyped as unintelligent and literal-minded. During the Byzantine Empire, when the great earthquake of AD 551 destroyed most of the cities of Phoenice, the law school of Berytus took refuge in Sidon. The town continued quietly for the next century, until the Muslim conquest of the Levant in 636.

=== Crusader-Ayyubid period ===
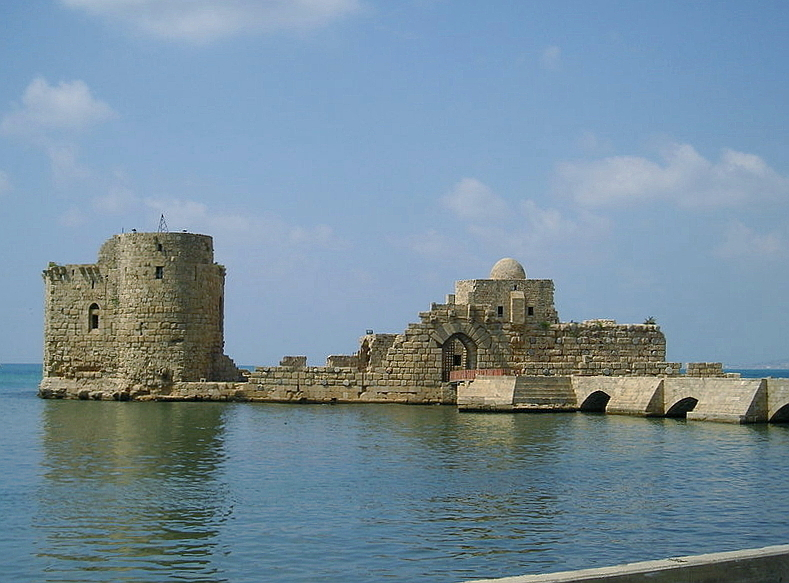
Sidon Sea Castle, built by the Crusaders in AD 1228

On 4 December 1110, Sidon was captured after the siege of Sidon, a decade after the First Crusade, by King Baldwin I of Jerusalem and King Sigurd I of Norway. It then became the center of the Lordship of Sidon, an important vassal-state of the Kingdom of Jerusalem. Saladin captured it from the Crusaders in 1187, but German Crusaders restored it to Christian control in the Crusade of 1197. It remained an important Crusader stronghold until it was destroyed by the Ayyubids in 1249. In 1260, it was again destroyed by the Mongols led by Kitbuqa. The remains of the original walls are still visible.

During the 12th century, Benjamin of Tudela noted the presence of approximately twenty Jews, possibly Jewish families, in Sidon, which he described as a "large city."

=== Ottoman period ===
After Sidon came under Ottoman Turkish rule in the early 16th century, it became the capital of the Sidon Eyalet (province) and regained a great deal of its earlier commercial importance. In 1521, Moses Basola encountered twenty families of Musta'rabi Jews during his visit to Sidon.

During the 18th century, the city was dominated by the Hammud family of notables, who monopolized the production and exporting of cotton in the region and built numerous palaces and public works in the city. The Hammuds also served as government customs agents and tax collectors for various Ottoman religious foundations.

During the Egyptian–Ottoman War, Sidon, like much of Ottoman Syria, was occupied by the forces of Muhammad Ali of Egypt. His ambitions were opposed by the British Empire, which backed the Ottomans. The British Admiral Charles Napier, commanding a mixed squadron of British, Turkish and Austrian ships, bombarded Sidon on 26 September 1840, and landed with a column. Sidon capitulated in two days, and the British went on to Acre. This action was recalled in two Royal Navy vessels being named HMS Sidon.

The 19th century brought significant changes to the Jewish community of Sidon. By 1830, the community, comprising around twenty-five families of primarily Arabic-speaking merchants, had customs akin to those of Judean Jews. Starting in 1850, the community witnessed growth as Maghrebi Jews, initially settled in the Chouf Mountains above Beirut, migrated to Sidon and Beirut amidst escalating Druze-Maronite tensions and the ensuing 1860 war. With roots in mountain traditions, they introduced citrus cultivation on the outskirts of Sidon, leading to the construction of a new synagogue in 1860 to meet the needs of the expanding community.

From 1887 the Royal necropolis of Sidon was extensively excavated by the Ottomans, and its treasures transferred to Istanbul (like the Alexander sarcophagus). Sidon was a small fishing town of 10,000 inhabitants in 1900.

=== After World War I ===
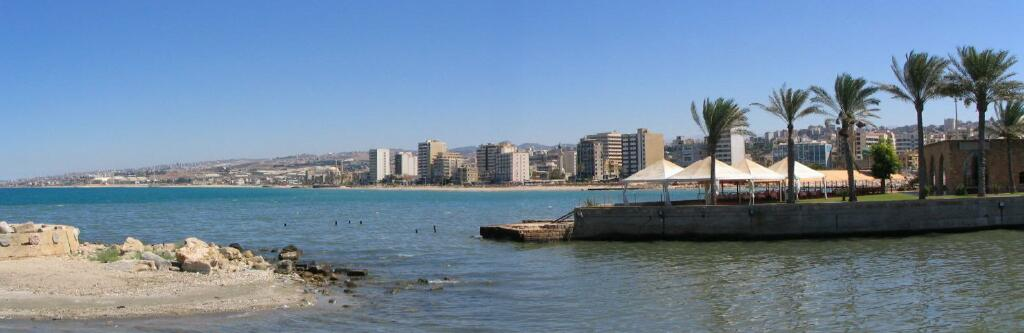
Sidon with a view of the Mediterranean coast

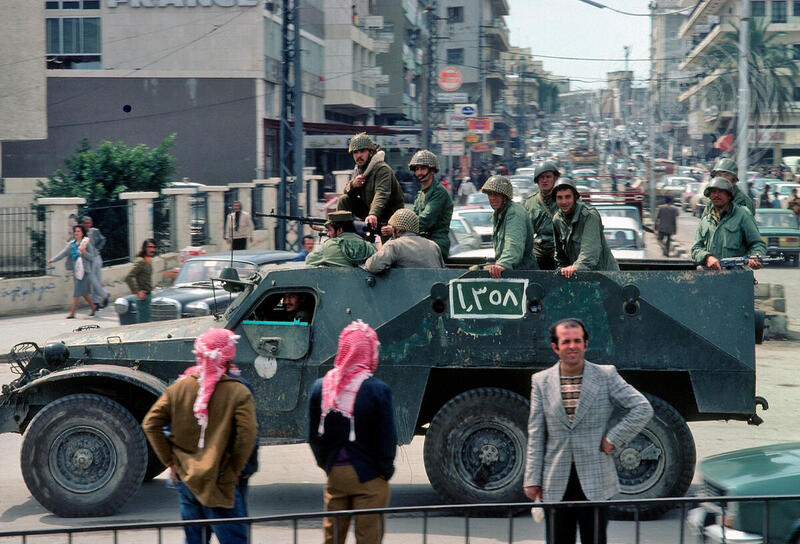
A Syrian BTR-152 armoured personnel carrier patrols the streets of the Lebanese port city of Saida (Sidon), March 1978.

After World War I it became part of the French Mandate of Lebanon. During World War II the city, together with the rest of Lebanon, was captured by British forces fighting against the Vichy French, and following the war it became a major city of independent Lebanon. Following the 1948 Palestinian expulsion and flight, Palestinian refugees arrived in Sidon, as in other Lebanese cities, and were settled at the large refugee camps of Ein el-Hilweh and Mieh Mieh. At first these consisted of enormous rows of tents, but gradually houses were constructed. The refugee camps constituted de facto neighborhoods of Sidon, but had a separate legal and political status which made them into a kind of enclaves. At the same time, the remaining Jews of the city fled, and the Jewish cemetery fell into disrepair, threatened by coastal erosion.

On Easter Sunday, 19 April 1981, at least sixteen people were killed in Sidon after the (South Lebanon Army) SLA's long-range artillery indiscriminately shelled the city centre. It was reported that it was in response to a request from Bashir Gemayel in connection with ongoing Syrian attacks on Phalangist positions around Zahle. Israel denied involvement. After the 1982 Israeli invasion of Lebanon, Sidon was occupied by the Israeli army for almost two and a half years.

On 18 August 1997, following a roadside bomb near Jezzine which killed two teenage members of a SLA leader's family, SLA artillery shelled Sidon killing seven civilians and wounding thirty-five. Hizbollah responded the following day by firing 60–80 rockets into the security zone and northern Israel. According to UNIFIL observers the missiles appeared to be targeted at uninhabited areas. The attack on Sidon is credited with leading to a truce between Hizbollah and Amal and increased cooperation between the two groups and the Lebanese Army. This was evident in the Ansariya ambush the following month.

On 8 June 1999, two gunmen entered the Palais de Justice, Sidon's main courthouse, and shot dead three magistrates and a chief prosecutor. The attackers escaped. No group claimed responsibility but suspicion focused on Osbat al-Ansar whose leader had been sentenced to death in absentia for the murder of the head of the Sufi Al-Ahbash movement and the attempted assassination of the mufti of Tripoli. He was believed to be in hiding in the Ain al-Hilwa refugee camp.

Studies in 2000 showed a population of 65,000 in the city, and around 200,000 in the metropolitan area. The little level land around the city is used for cultivation of wheat, vegetables, and fruits, especially citrus and bananas. The fishing in the city remains active with a newly opened fishery that sells fresh fish by bidding every morning. The ancient basin was transformed into a fishing port, while a small quay was constructed to receive small commercial vessels (see "Old City" and the "Architecture and landscape" sections below).

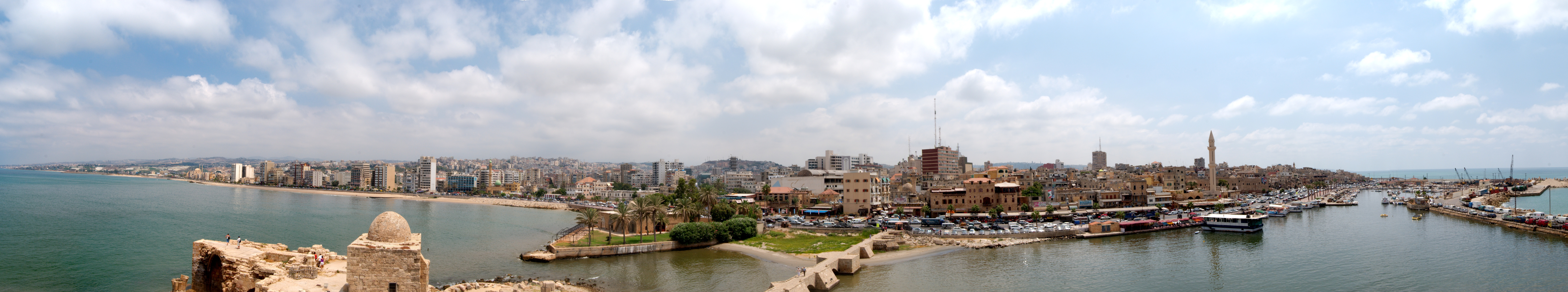
Panorama of Sidon as seen from the top of the Sea Castle, 2009

Saida Municipal Stadium was inaugurated in 2000 for the Asian Football Confederation's Cup 2000.

== Politics ==
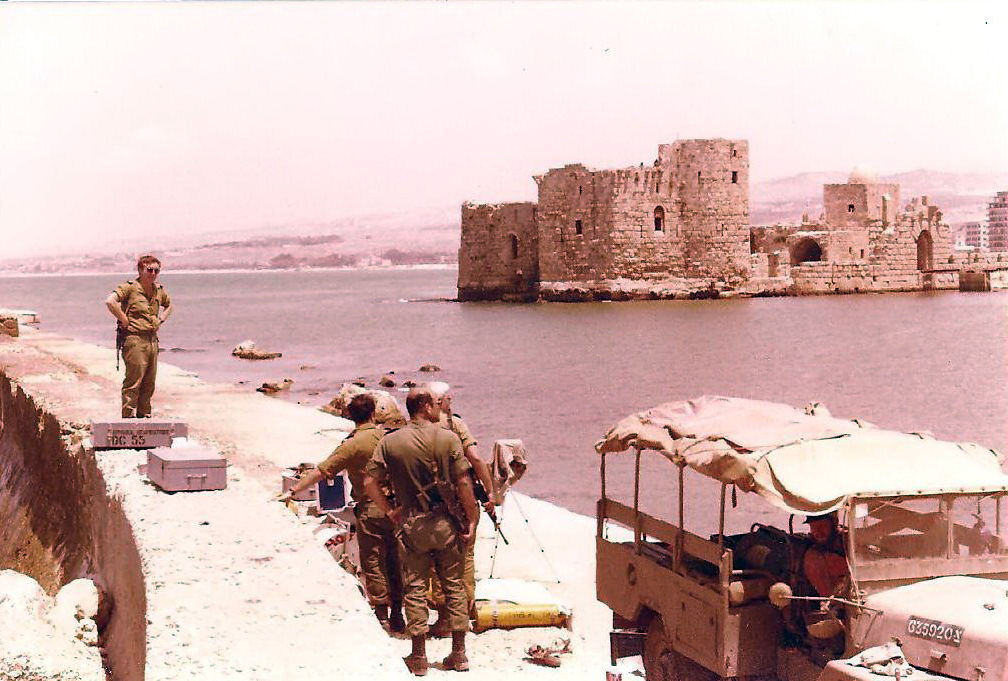
Israeli soldiers in the port of Sidon, June 1982

This sectarian and demographic division rose to the surface during the Lebanese Civil War, when armed clashes erupted between Sunni Muslims and Christians. The clashes ended with the surrender of the Christian front, and Christians were forced to move to east Beirut. After the war ended in 1990, some Christians gradually returned to their hometowns but in 2000 many fled to Israel. The local politics of Sidon in the 20th century was mainly dominated up till the 1980s by allegiances around two main families, the El-Bizri and Saad. The El-Bizri politicians were known for their business connections, close ties with eminent Lebanese and Levantine leaders, and their bent on serving the Lebanese state as government ministers, officials and mayors. The Saad politicians tended to be populist and became engaged in violent protests in the 1940s, 1950s and then during the Lebanese civil war as Nasserites (populist followers of Nasser in Lebanon).

The local political conflict between these two families was always resolved through amicable means and ties of kinship. Their hold over the political aspects of the city was similar to that of Mediterranean families in Sicily or to being also influenced by the ties of Arab families, clans, and tribes in traditionalist forms. The most notable figures of the El-Bizri family in the first half of the 20th century were: Ahmad El-Bizri (born 1899), Salah El-Bizri, Eizeddine El-Bizri (commonly known as Eizzo) and Anwar El-Bizri (born 1910). These four brothers were businessmen and politicians who dominated the political life of the city up till the late 1940s, using traditional inherited forms of governance since Ottoman times. With intelligence and strength they maintained their power for over 50 years. It is from their ranks that Maarouf Saad started his public life, and their close cousins, Nazih El-Bizri, Amin El-Bizri, and Fouad El-Bizri became the next generation of politicians and statesmen in Lebanon; holding positions as ministers and members of parliament.

The El-Bizri and the Saad political practices were bent on social justice and on local service in public affairs. The El-Bizri were since the Ottoman rule bent on serving the state, and this continued with their loyalty and support to the successive governments of Lebanon since the times of independence. They also helped eminent politicians and statesmen from Sidonian descent such as the Prime Ministers Riad Solh, Takieddine el-Solh and Rashid Solh, they also gave their support to former Prime Minister Saeb Salam, father of Tamam Salam, Prime Minister 2014–2016. The presence of the El-Bizris was at times intimidating on the local scene, but they were also known for their goodwill and dignified public service.

The Saad family developed their links with Nasserism in the 1950s and engaged in the uprising and armed protest of 1958 against the government of the Lebanese President Chamoun. They also became involved in the civil war as part of the left wing politics of the Lebanon (Al-Haraka al-Wataniyya) with PLO connections, and they actively contributed to resisting the Israeli occupation after 1982. The Saads remained populist in their politics and focused on the grassroots, while the El-Bizri were generally appealing to the middle and upper classes. In the middle 1980s, the Hariri family began to rise to prominence and became the most influential in Sidon in political and financial terms, even though the presence of the Saad and the El-Bizri in local politics remained significant at the level of visibility and activism. The Saad family developed its original politics from within the sphere of influence of the El-Bizri family and then became a power to reckon with on its own after 1948, and most powerfully in 1958, then in the civil war and until the present today.

Maarouf Saad, the leader of his family, and a local influential politician, was assassinated at the eve of the Lebanese civil war in 1975. The Saads retained their populism and grassroots appeal, and attracted a core of loyal adherents since the middle of the 20th century. While the El-Bizri were Levantine in their Arabism (namely focused mainly on Bilad al-Shaam in regional politics), and the Solh being also similar to them in this, the Saad were leaning more towards a broader pan-Arabism (Nasserite, Libyan, and then Syrian). The Hariri family started to rise to political and economic prominence in the 1980s and became perhaps the most influential family in Lebanon by the mid-1990s, following modern forms of political practice through a large party (Future Movement) that cuts across various economic classes.

== Impact on Sidon of regional underdevelopment ==
According to a 2013 United Nations Development Programme (UNDP) report "data also point to an increase in urban poverty especially in Lebanon's largest cities suburbs such as Beirut, Tripoli and Saida, as illustrated by poverty-driven symptoms (child labour, over-crowding and deteriorated environment conditions)." In another UNDP report, the author discusses the development predominance of Beirut over the rest of the regions of Lebanon (North, South and Beqaa) is a well-known imbalance that can be dated to the early 19th century. With the expansion of Beirut in the 1870s, urban growth in the future capital outpaced Tripoli and Saida. Transportation routes, missionary schools, universities and hospitals as well as the Beirut port development and the commerce of silk participated to the fortification of Beirut as a major trade center for Mediterranean exchange (ARNAUD 1993; LABAKI 1999: 23). However, the establishment of Great Lebanon in 1920, under the French mandate, added the poorer areas of the North (Akkar), Beqaa (Baalbak-Hermel) and the South (Jabal Aamel) to the relatively affluent cities of Mount Lebanon. This addition made of Lebanon a country composed of unequally developed regions. This legacy remains a heavy load to bear socially, culturally, economically and politically. Even though the public policies elaborated by the young Lebanese State were attempting to have regional perspectives, the early urban planning schemes reveal a development approach exclusively axed on Beirut and its suburbs.

The post war development policy of the State, promoted by Hariri government (1992–1998), was centered around balanced development and is widely inspired by the 1943 Pact and the 1989 Taef agreement (LABAKI1993: 104). However the application of this policy aims mainly at the rehabilitation and construction of roads and infrastructures (electricity, telephone, sewage). Another of its components is the rehabilitation of government buildings (airport, port, schools, universities and hospitals). Transportation projects (mainly concentrated on the coastal line) constitute 25% of the budget of 10-year economic plan developed by the CDR (BAALBAKI 1994: 90). However, all these projects are predominantly concentrated around Beirut, ignoring the regions.

=== The former Makab (waste dump) and the treatment plant ===
Near the southern entrance to the city used to be a 'rubbish mountain' called at the time by the locals the Makab; namely, a 600,000 cubic metre heap that reached the height of a four-story building. It was originally created to dispose of the remains of buildings destroyed in Israeli air strikes during the 1982 invasion, but it then became the main dump for the city. Growing out of the sea, it became an environmental hazard, with medical waste and plastic bags polluting nearby fishing grounds.

Sidon politicians, including the Hariri family, failed for decades to resolve the Makab crisis—which has endangered residents' health (especially during episodic burning). In 2004, Engineer Hamzi Moghrabi, a Sidon native, conceived the idea to establish a treatment plant for the city's decades-old chronic waste problem. He established the privately funded IBC Enviro and the treatment plant became operational in 2013.

The Ministry of Environment came up with a $50,000+ plan to clean the whole area and transform the dump into a green space, along with other heaps in the country. Qamla beach in Sidon, a coast in close proximity to the Sea Castle, witnessed a large municipal cleanup in May 2011, as it was an easy target of rubbish being washed up by the Makab. These plans aim to revive the former glory of the city's coasts and attract tourists who avoided swimming in Sidon's sea before. The project of cleaning the region where the waste dump has already started, and currently a waves-barrier is being built, and the vast bulk of the waste dump being cleared.

== Local government ==
The city of Sidon is administered by the Municipality of Sidon. The municipality is constituted of a council of 21 members including the City Mayor and his Deputy. It has administrative and financial independence but remains under the control and supervision of the central government, specifically the Ministry of Interior. The municipality's jurisdiction is limited to a region of 786 hectares in area and 5 meters in elevation, while each of the city's suburbs is administered by its own independent municipal council. Sidon is the center of the Governorate of South Lebanon, and hosts the seat of the Governor of Southern Lebanon. The city is also the center of the Sidon District and the Union of Sidon and Zahrani Municipalities (founded in 1978 and contains 15 municipalities). Sidon hosts the southern regional headquarters of a series of governmental facilities like the Central Bank of Lebanon, Électricité du Liban, Central Telecommunications Station and others. It is also the home of the Justice Palace of South Lebanon in its new headquarters on East Boulevard (the old headquarters were an old Ottoman Saray that is currently occupied by the LSF and is planned to be transformed into a cultural center by the municipality).

In the 2000 and 2005 parliamentary elections, the Sidon District along with the Tyre and Bint Jbeil districts formed the first electoral district of South Lebanon. However, in the 2009 elections – and due to the reactivation of the 1960 electoral law – the city of Sidon was separated from its district to form a separate electoral district.

== Demographics ==
Religion in Sidon (2014)
Religion	Percent
Sunni Islam	72.16%
Shia Islam	10.83%
Christian	16.49%
Jews	0.52%

In 2014, Muslims made up 82.99% and Christians made up 16.49% of registered voters in Sidon. 72.16% of the voters were Sunni Muslims and 10.83% were Shiite Muslims.

The overwhelming majority of Sidon's population belong to the Sunni sect of Islam, with a small number of Shiites and Christians. Sidon is the seat of the Greek Melkite Catholic Archbishop of Sidon and Deir el Qamar, and has housed a significant Catholic population throughout its history. Sidon also hosts the seat of the Shiite Ayatollah of South Lebanon.

In the 1930s, when Lebanon was still under the French mandate, Sidon had the largest Jewish population in Lebanon, estimated at 3,588, compared to 3,060 in Beirut, however by the end of 1990s most of the Jewish population had emigrated leaving their cemetery and other sites in a state of abandonment.

== Main sights ==
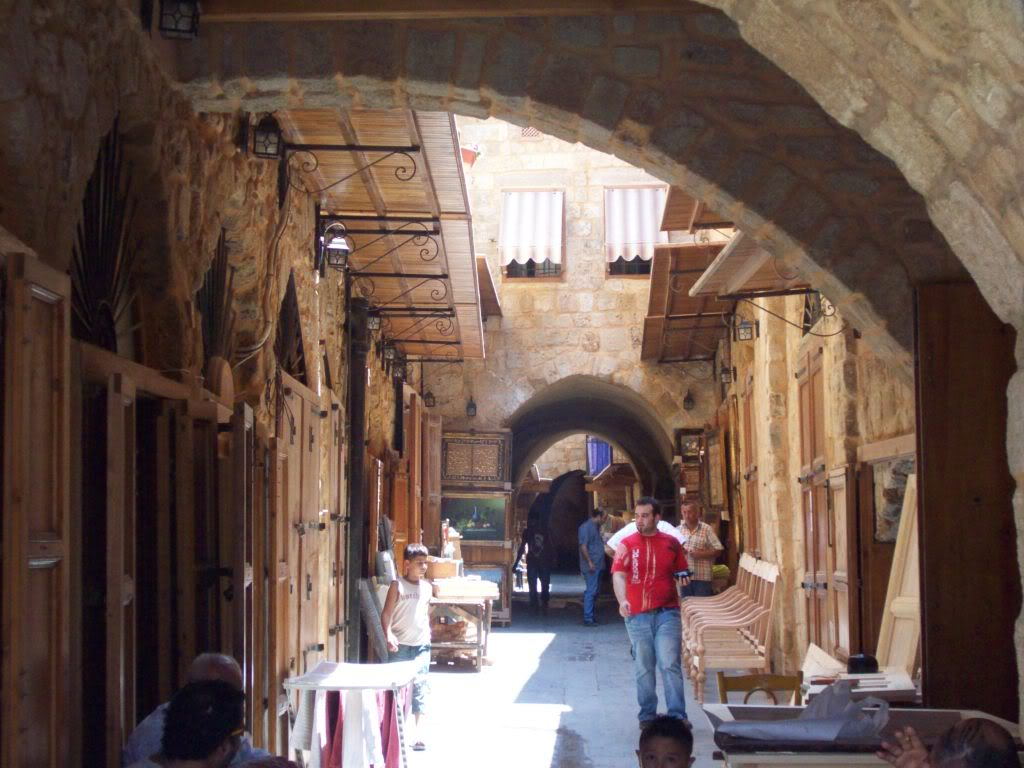
Alleyway inside the Old Souks

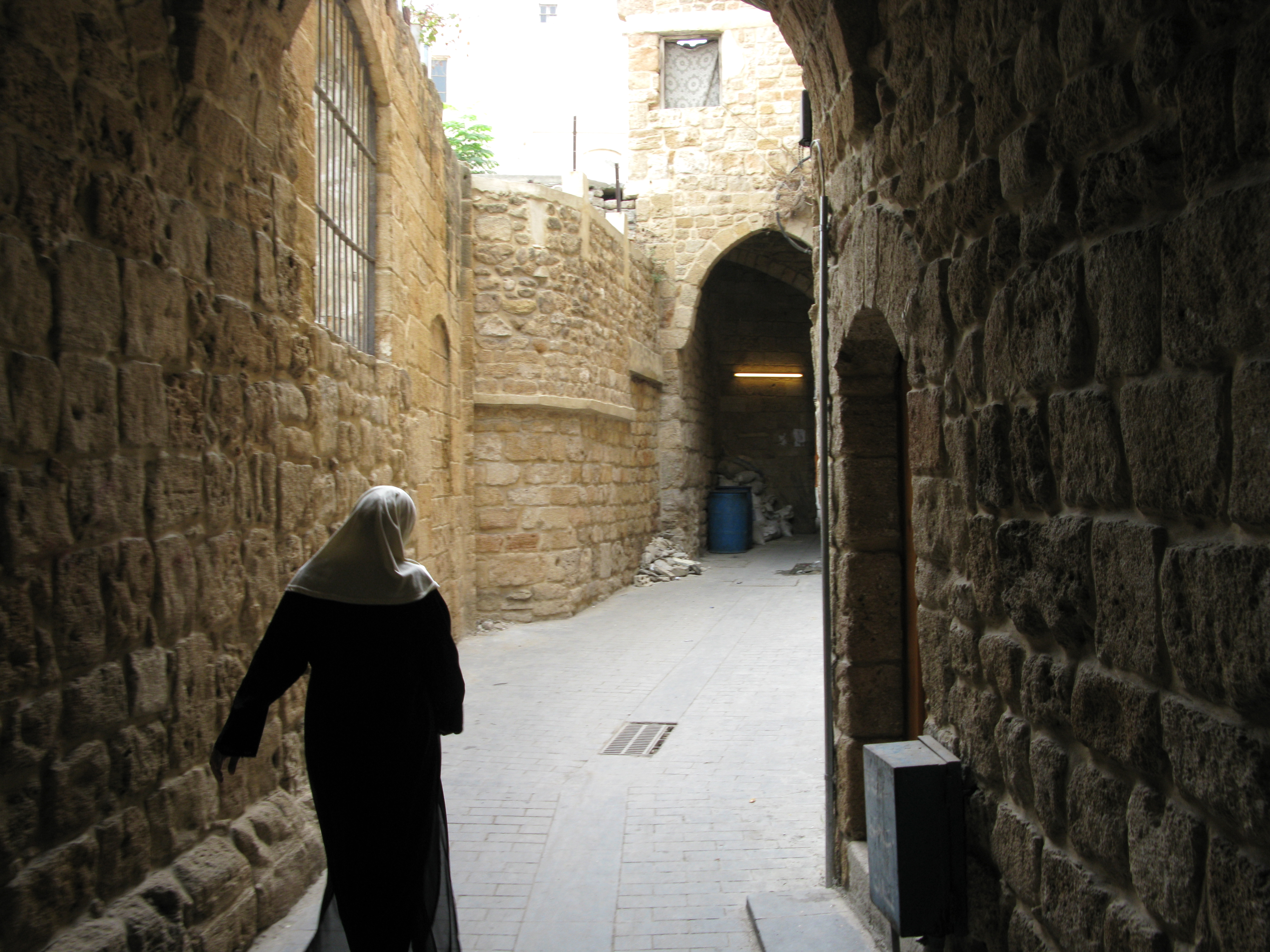
Alleyways of the Old City of Sidon

- Sidon Sea Castle, a fortress built by the Crusaders in the early 13th century. It is located near the Port of Sidon.
- Sidon Soap Museum. It traces the history of the soap making in the region and its different manufacturing steps.
- Khan al-Franj ("Caravanserai of the French"), a complex built in the 16th century, though erroneously credited to Emir Fakhreddine II in the 17th century. It gained its name for accommodating French merchants and goods in order to develop trade with Europe. This is a typical khan with a large rectangular courtyard and a central fountain surrounded by covered galleries.
- Debbane Palace, a historical residence built in 1721, an example of Arab-Ottoman architecture. This villa was earlier occupied by the Hammoud family in the 18th century and also by members of the famous Ottoman aristocrats of the Abaza clan in the late 19th century and early 20th century. The vaults at the ground level being originally stables for the villa residents and then turned into shops as part of the old souks, and known until recent time by association to the Abazas.
- The Castle of St. Louis (Qalaat Al Muizz). It was built by the Crusaders in the 13th century on top of the remains of a fortress built by the Fatimid caliph Al Muizz. It is located to the south of the Old Souks near Murex Hill.
- Eshmun Temple, dedicated to the Phoenician god of healing. Built in the 7th century BC, it is located in the north of Sidon near the Awali River.
- The British War Cemetery in Sidon. Opened in 1943 by units of His Majesty's (King George VI) British Forces occupying the Lebanon after the 1941 campaign against the Vichy French troops. It was originally used for the burial of men who died while serving with the occupation force, but subsequently the graves of a number of the casualties of the 1941 campaign were moved into the cemetery from other burial grounds or from isolated positions in the vicinity. The cemetery now contains 176 Commonwealth burials of the Second World War and nine war graves of other nationalities. It was designed by G. Vey. It is perhaps the only garden in modern Sidon that is elegantly kept and cared for. It is not a public garden, but can be visited when the wardens have its gateways opened.

== Education ==
Sidon is home to numerous educational facilities ranging from public elementary schools to private universities. According to a 2006 study, the city is home to 29 schools that serve a total of 18,731 students: 37% are in public schools, 63% are in private schools. Sidon also contains 10 universities, 5 of which are private universities.

University	Faculty	Type
Lebanese International University (LIU)	N/A	Private
Lebanese University (LU)	Faculty of Law, Political Science and Public Administration	Public
Saint Joseph University (USJ)	N/A	Private
American University of Lebanon (AUL)	N/A	Private
Al-Jinan University	N/A	Private
Lebanese University (LU)	Faculty of Public Health	Public
Lebanese University (LU)	Faculty of Literature and human Science	Public
Lebanese University (LU)	Institute of Social Sciences	Public
American University of Science and Technology	N/A	Private
Lebanese American University	N/A	Private
Lebanese University (LU)	Institute of Technology	Public

== Archaeology ==
The following archaeological sites in the area indicate settlements from the earliest prehistorical times.

Sidon I, II and III are prehistoric sites, while Sidon I is the tell of ancient Sidon starting from the Early Bronze Age.

Sidon I is an archaeological site located to the east of the city, south of the road to Jezzine. An assemblage of flint tools was found by P. E. Gigues suggested to date between 3800 and 3200 BC. The collection included narrow axes or chisels that were polished on one side and flaked on the other, similar to ones found at Ain Cheikh, Nahr Zahrani and Gelal en Namous. The collection appears to have gone missing from the Archaeological Museum of the American University of Beirut.

Sidon II is said to be "near the church" at approximately fifty meters above sea level. P. E. Gigues suggested that the industry found on the surface of this site dated to the Acheulean.

Sidon III was found by E. Passemard in the 1920s, who made a collection of material that is now in the National Museum of Beirut marked "Camp de l'Aviation". It includes large flint and chert bifacials that may be of Heavy Neolithic origin.

Sidon IV is the tell mound of ancient Sidon with Early Bronze Age (c. 3200 BC) deposits, now located underneath the ruined Saint Louis Castle and what are also thought to be the ruins of a Roman theater.

=== Bronze Age city and kingdom ===
==== City of Sidon (Sidon IV site) ====
In the area of this ruined Crusader castle, recent excavations uncovered a late Early Bronze Age I (EB I) settlement on bedrock. Here, an uninterrupted sequence from EB I to EB III was found. A modest third-millennium BC settlement consisting of domestic installations and tombs was also uncovered. Yet the following history of Sidon was not clarified. Very little has been known about the location, extent, and significance of Middle Bronze Age (MBA) Sidon until recently.

==== Tell el-Burak MBA settlement ====
Since the early 21st century, Tell el-Burak excavations have helped significantly in this area, because it was an active settlement during MBA, and quite well preserved. Tell el-Burak is located along the coast 9 km south from Sidon. Previously, there was a big gap in the history of this whole coastal area from the end of the Early Bronze Age until the middle of the 2nd millennium BC, when Sidon is first mentioned in the historical texts.

==== MBA kingdom of Sidon ====
Archaeologists determined that Sidon was clearly the big power centre during MBA, controlling significant territory. So there appears to have been the "Kingdom of Sidon" that controlled el-Burak, and many other surrounding areas.

=== Excavation history ===
The area around Sidon contains a number of important necropoli (below in order of age, and noting their principal excavators):

- Dakerman (Roger Saidah, 1968–1969)
- Tambourit (Saidah, 1977)
- Magharet Abloun (Aimé Péretié, 1855; Ernest Renan, 1864; Georges Contenau, 1920)
- Ayaa (William King Eddy, 1887; Osman Hamdi Bey, 1892; Contenau, 1920)
- Ain al-Hilweh (Charles Cutler Torrey, 1919–1920)
- El-Merah (Contenau, 1920)
- Qrayé (Contenau, 1920)
- Almoun, (Conenau, 1924)
- El-Harah (Theodore Makridi, 1904; Contenau, 1924)
- Magharet Abloun, Greco-Roman part (Renan, 1864; Contenau, 1914–1924)
- Helalié/Baramié/Mar Elias (William John Bankes, 1816; Renan 1864; Contenau, 1914; M. Meurdrac & L. Albanèse, 1938–1939)

In indication of the high-profile of the old city of Sidon in archaeological expeditions, and mainly in the 19th century, in October 1860 the famous French scholar Ernest Renan was entrusted with an archaeological mission to Lebanon, which included the search for the antique parts of Sidon. The Phoenician inscriptions that he discovered, and his field data, were eventually published in his notebook the: Mission de Phénicie (1864–1874; Phoenician Expedition).

The St. Louis castle grounds were excavated in 1914–1920 by a French team. Then eastwards a new site was also excavated by another generation of French expeditions in the 1960s. This same site received renewed attention in 1998 when the Directorate General of Antiquities in Lebanon authorized the British Museum to begin excavations on this area of land that was specifically demarcated for archaeological research. This has resulted in published papers, with a special focus on studying ceramics.

The archaeological fieldwork was not fully undertaken since the independence of the Lebanon. The main finds are displayed in the National Museum in Beirut. The fieldwork was also interrupted during the long civil war period, and it is now resumed but at a timid and slow scale, and not involving major international expeditions or expertise. Perhaps this is also indicative of the general lack in cultural interests among the authorities of this city, and almost of the non-existence of notable intellectual activities in its modern life. There are signs that the locals are beginning to recognize the value of the medieval quarters, but this remains linked to minor individual initiatives and not a coordinated collective effort to rehabilitate it like it has been the case with Byblos, even though the old district of Sidon contains a great wealth in old and ancient architecture.

During the 2024 Israeli invasion of Lebanon, UNESCO gave enhanced protection to 34 cultural sites in Lebanon including the archaeological sites at Sidon to safeguard them from damage.

== In the Bible ==
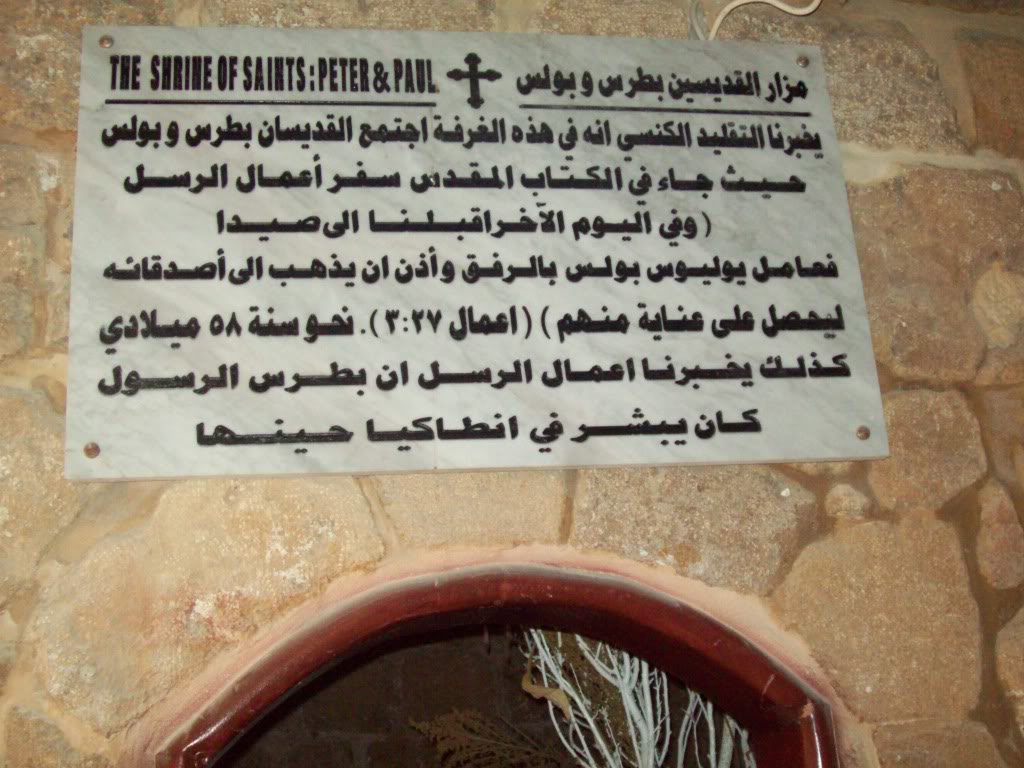
Shrine commemorating the last meeting place between St. Paul and St. Peter inside the Old City of Sidon

=== Hebrew Bible/Old Testament ===
The Hebrew Bible describes Sidon (צִידוֹן) in several passages:

- It received its name from the "first-born" of Canaan, the grandson of Noah.
- The Tribe of Zebulun has a frontier on Sidon
- It was the first home of the Phoenicians on the coast of Canaan, and from its extensive commercial relations became a "great" city.
- It was the mother city of Tyre. It lay within the lot of the tribe of Asher, but was never subdued.
- The Sidonians long oppressed Israel.
- From the time of David, its glory began to wane, and Tyre, its "virgin daughter", rose to its place of pre-eminence.
- Solomon entered into a matrimonial alliance with the Sidonians, and thus their form of idolatrous worship found a place in the land of Israel.
- Jezebel was the daughter of King Ithobaal I of Sidon.
- It was famous for its manufactures and arts, as well as for its commerce.
- It is frequently referred to by the prophets.
- Elijah sojourned in Sidon, performing miracles.

=== New Testament ===
- Jesus visited the region or "coasts" (King James Version) of Tyre and Sidon and from this region many came forth to hear him preaching, leading to the stark contrast in Matthew 11:21-23 to Korazin and Bethsaida. See the exorcism of the Syrophoenician woman's daughter, which takes place on the coast, in the region of Sidon and Tyre. Then he returned from the region of Tyre, and went by way of Sidon towards the Sea of Galilee, in the region of the Decapolis
- From Sidon, at which his ship put in after leaving Caesarea, Paul finally sailed for Rome.

== In ancient mythology ==
- The account ascribed to the Phoenician historian Sanchuniathon makes Sidon a daughter of Pontus, son of Nereus. She is said there to have first invented musical song from the sweetness of her voice.

== Gallery ==
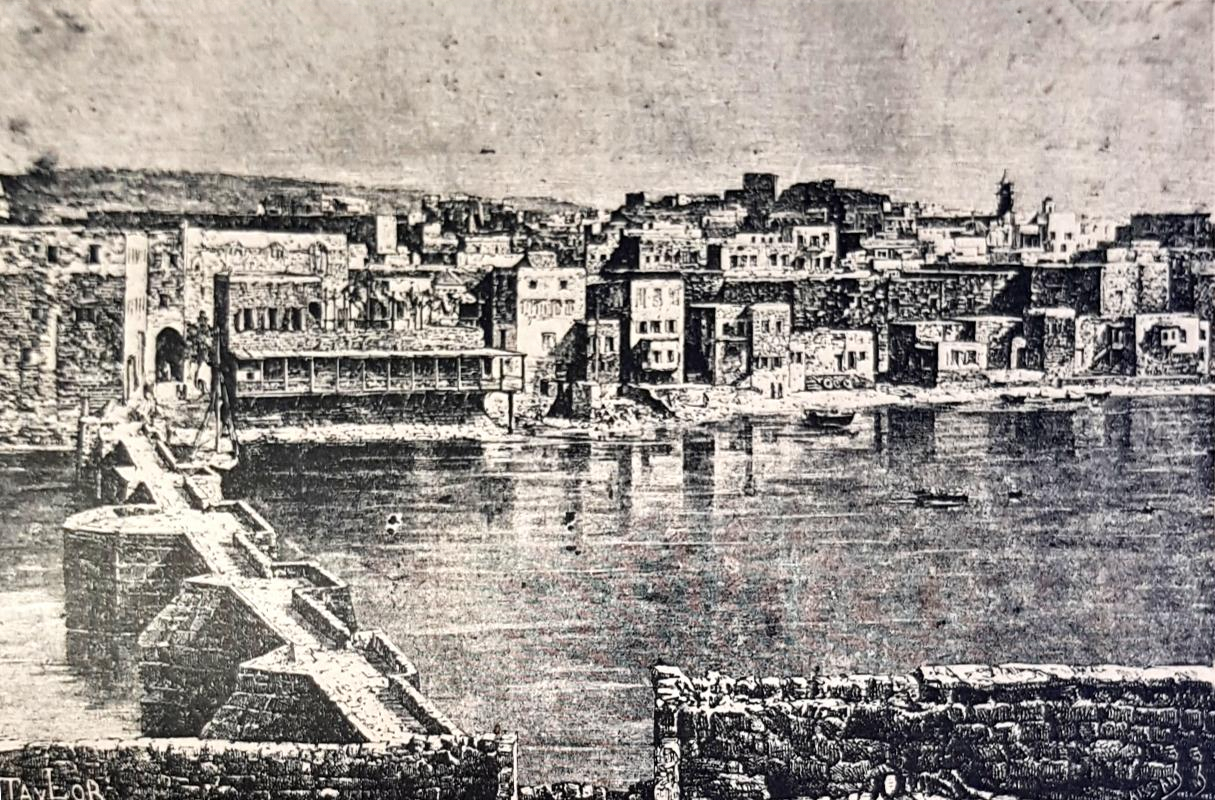
Port of Sidon, 19th century

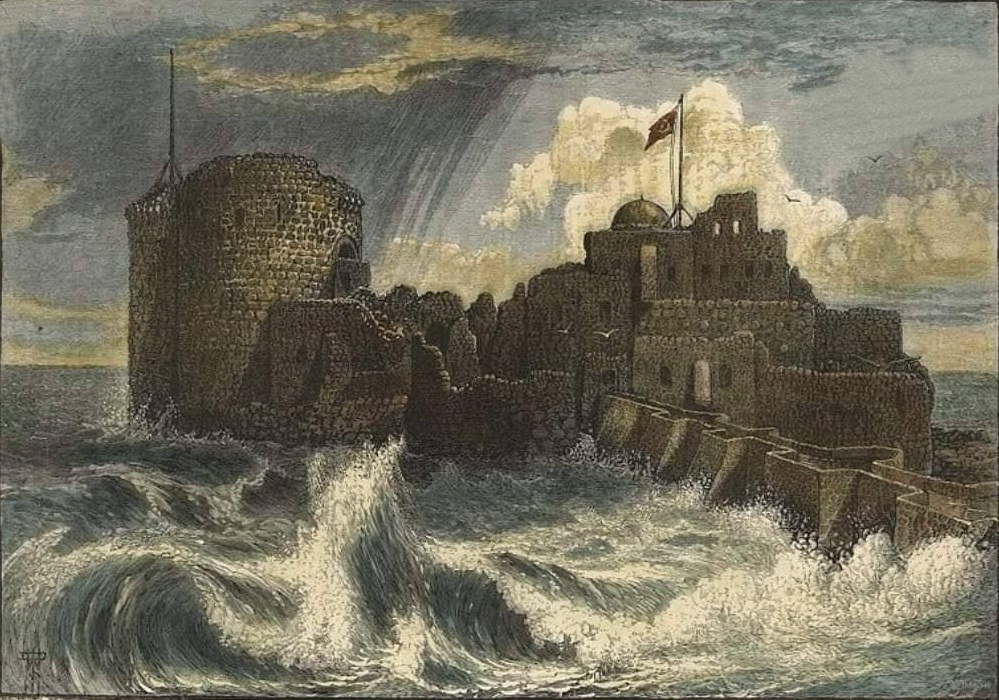
The castle and the harbour of Saida, the ancient Sidon

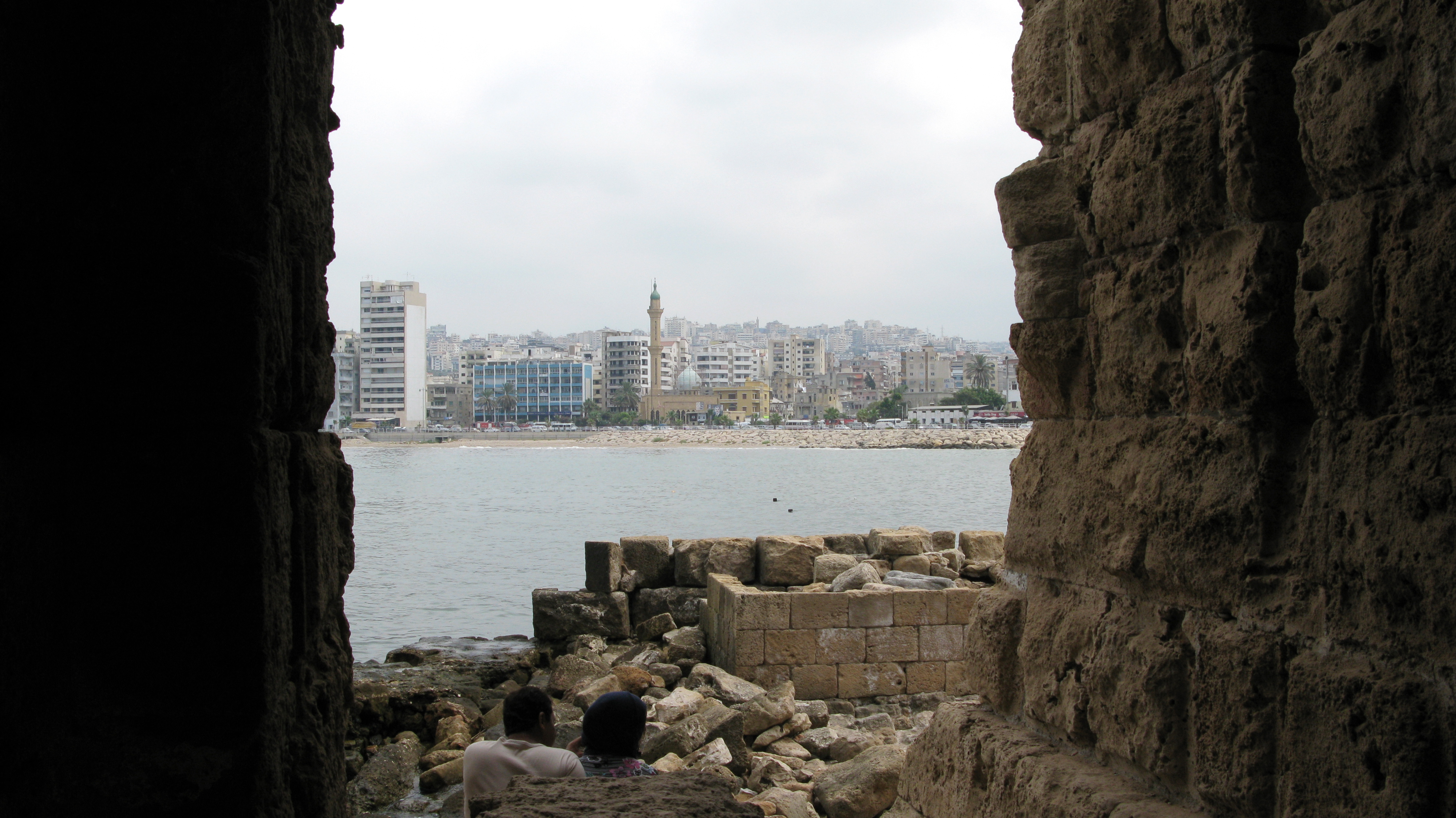
Sidon Castle

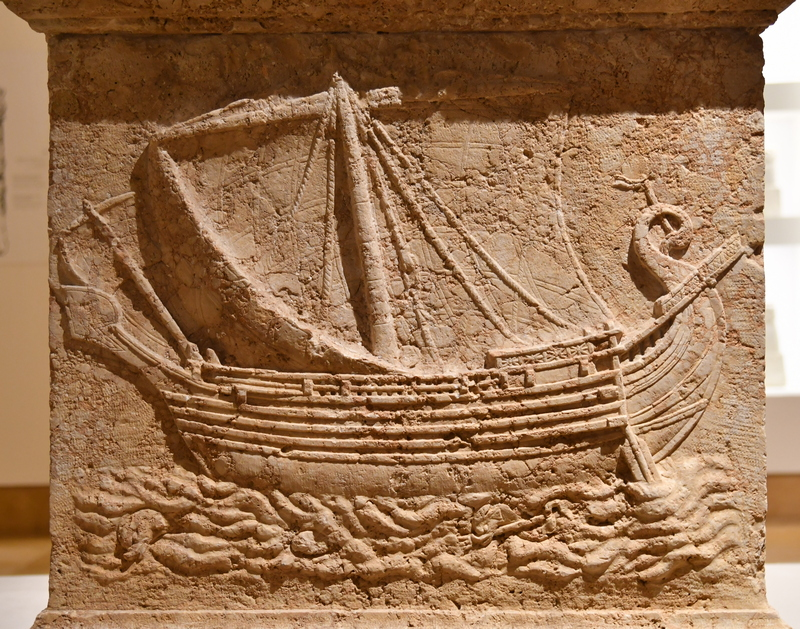
Sidon, Sarcophagus relief of a boat

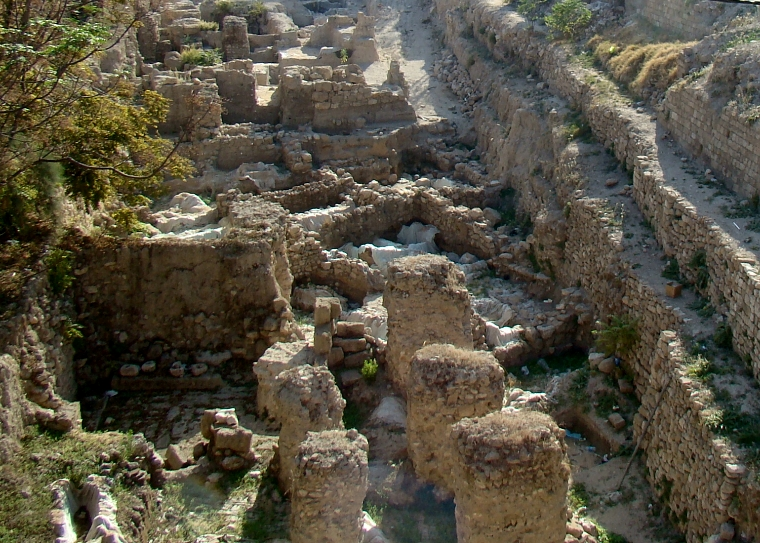
Sidon College site

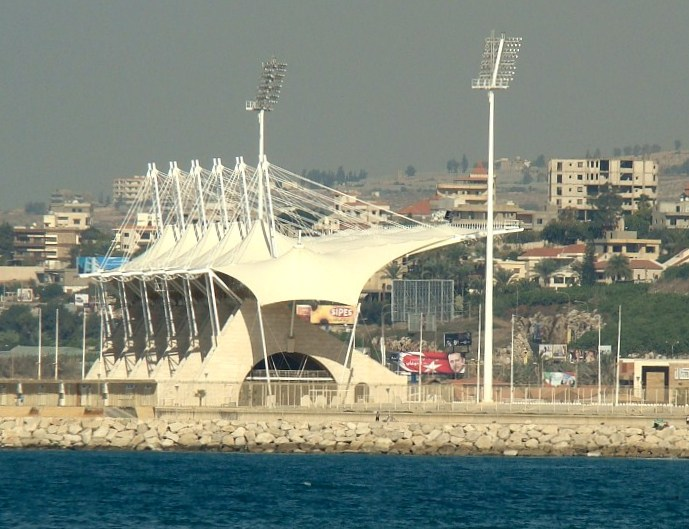
Sidon Stadium

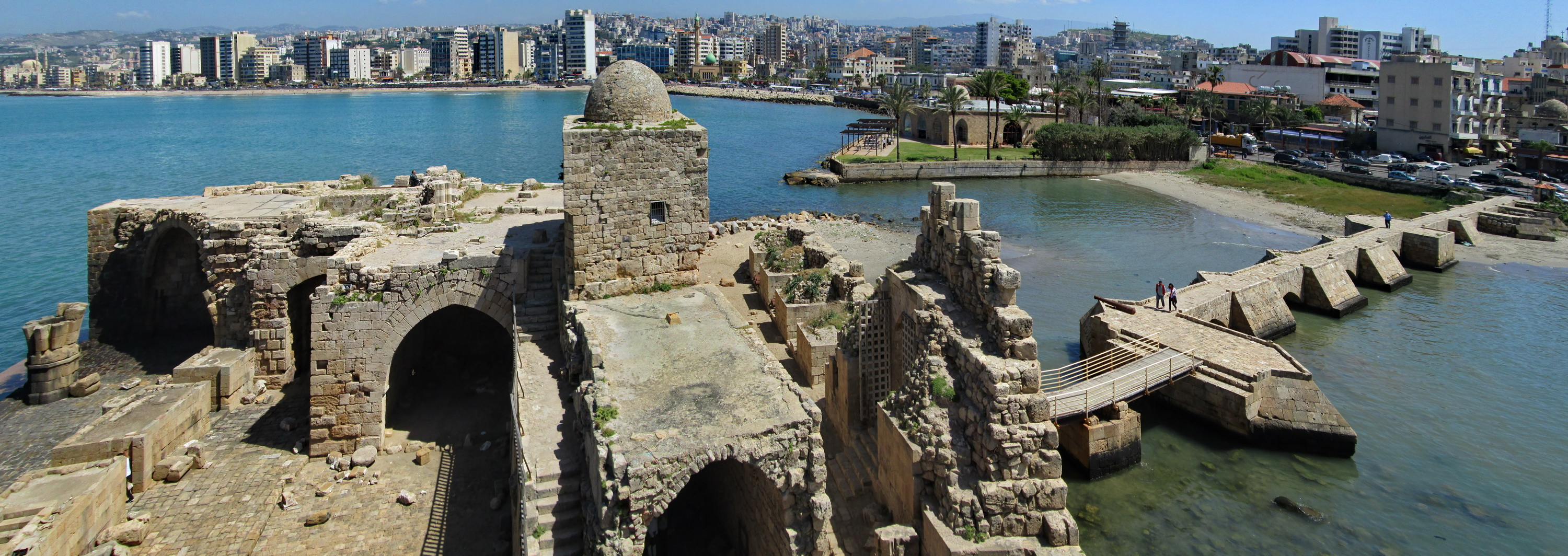
Sidon, Lebanon, Panorama

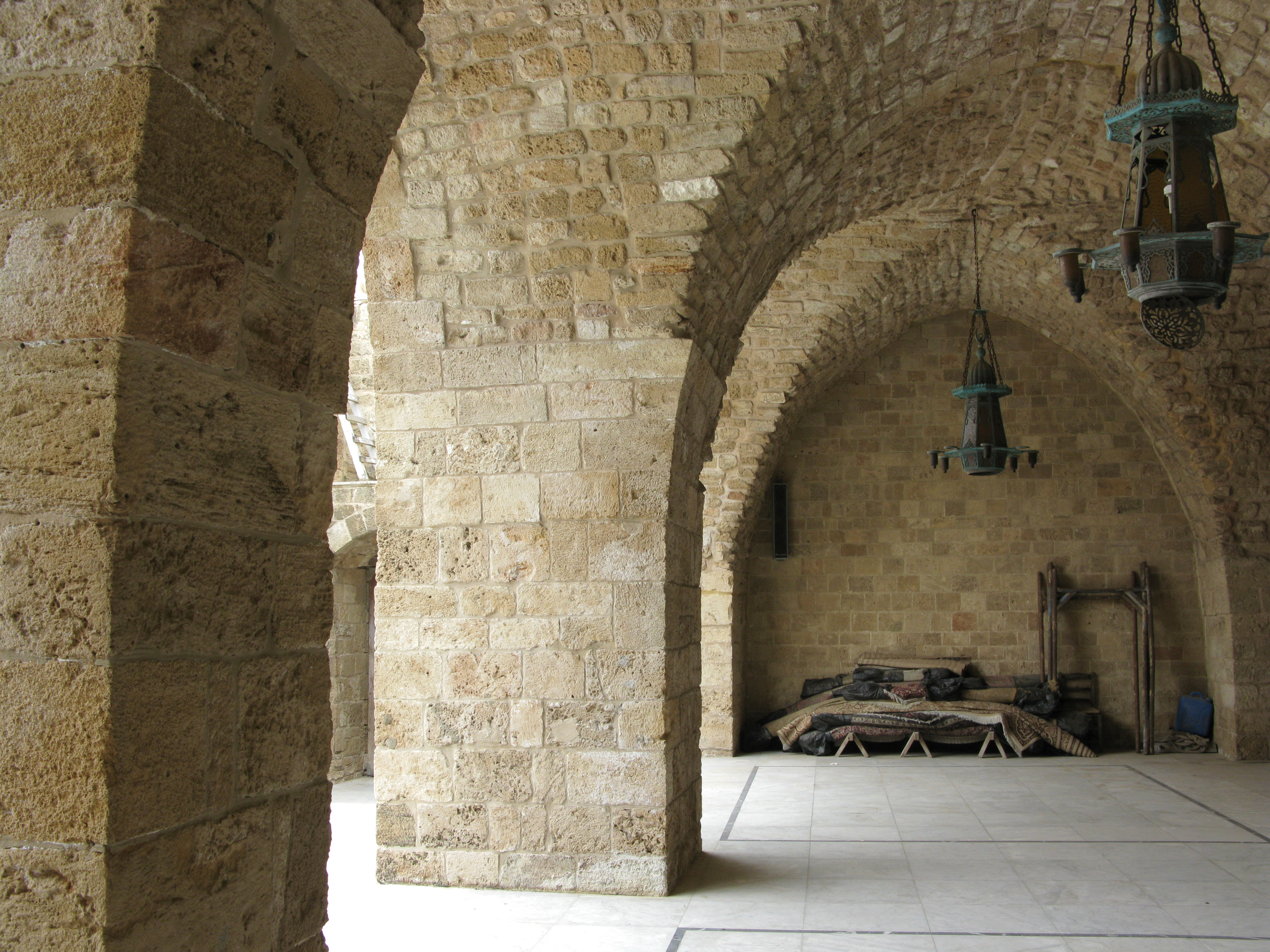
Mosque, Sidon

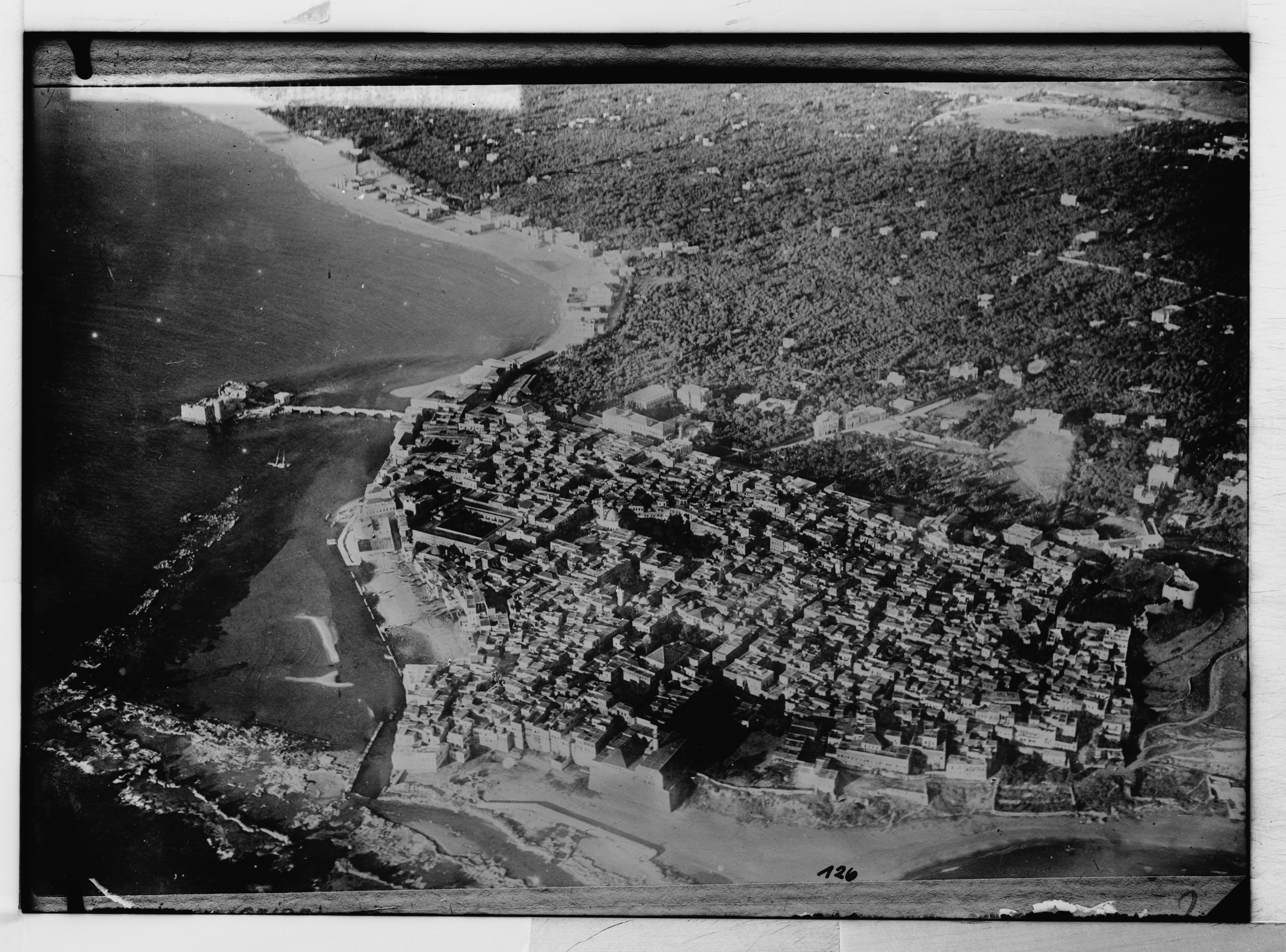
صيدا - صورة جوية قديمة

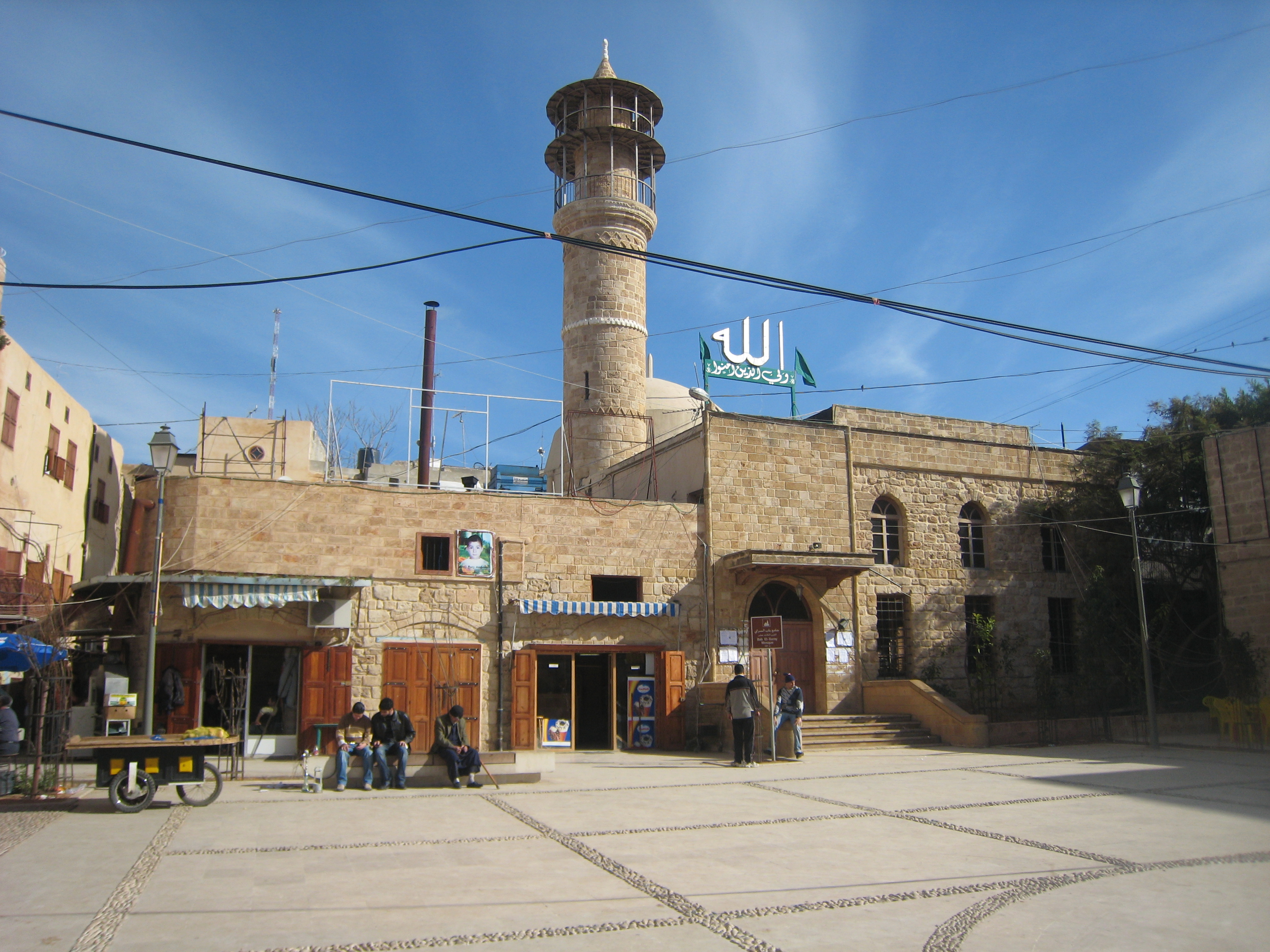
Mosque

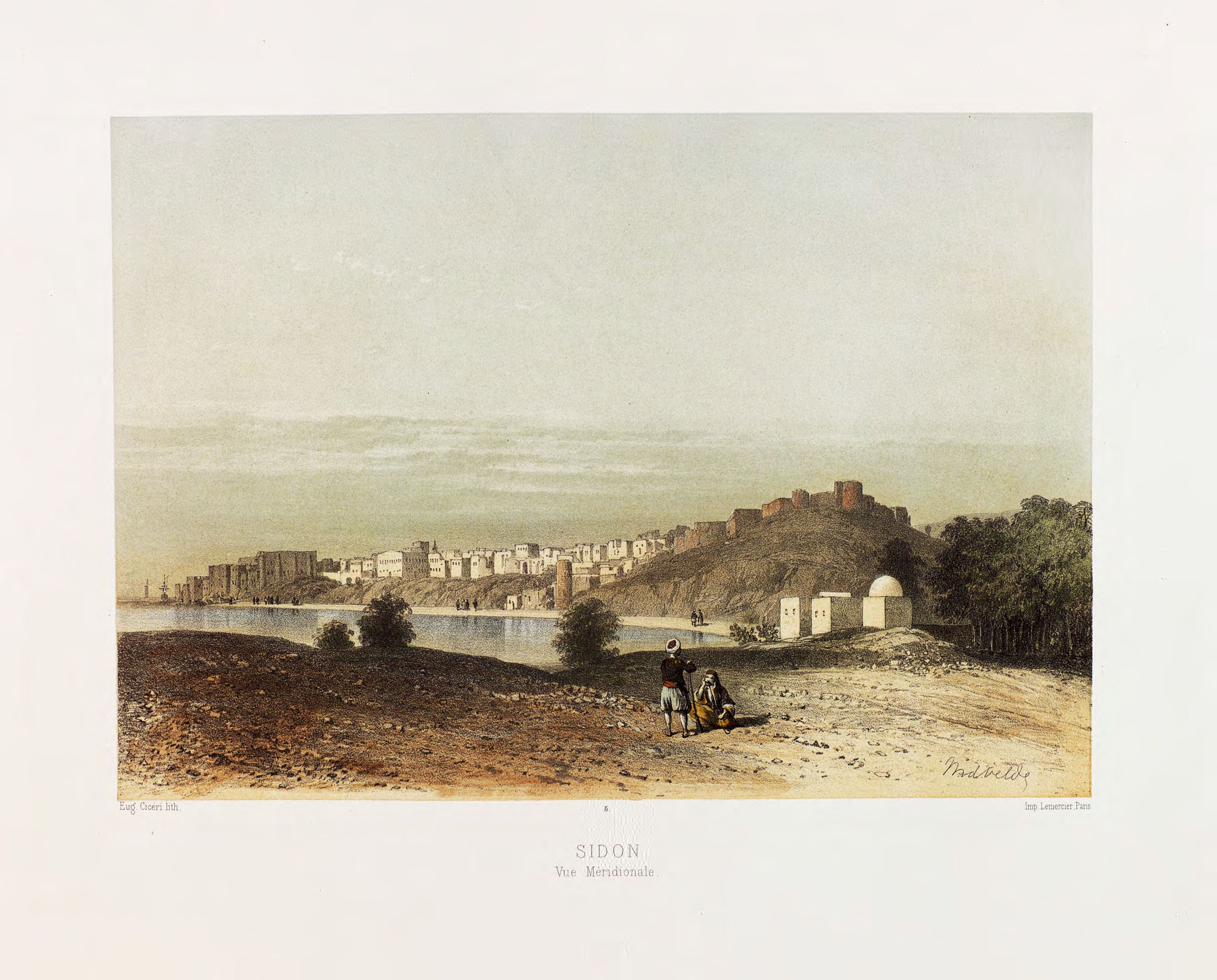
Sidon, vue meridionale (viewed from the south)

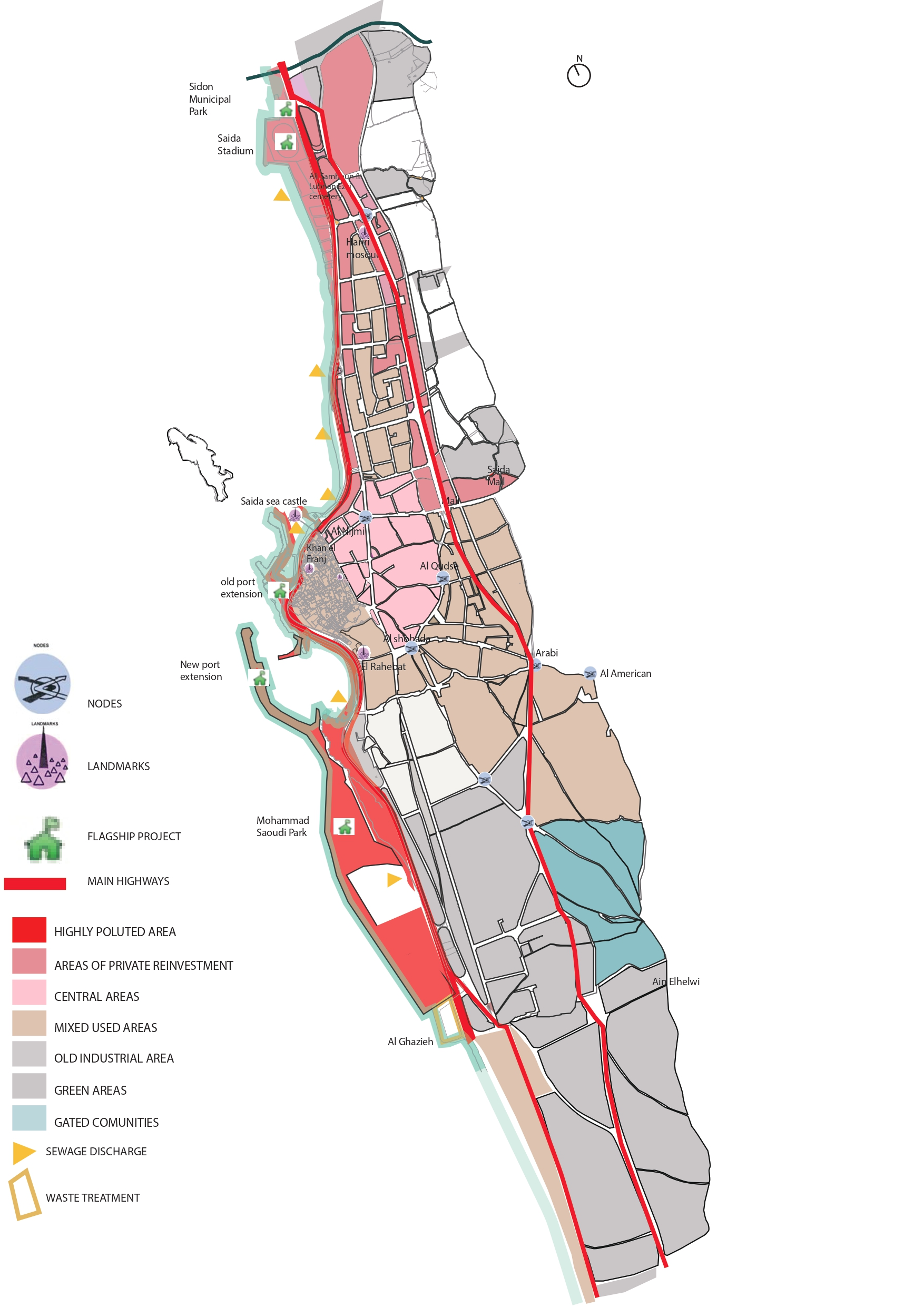
Sidon District Map

== Twin towns and sister cities ==
- Zugló, Hungary
- Constanța, Romania
- Sofia, Bulgaria
- Sochi, Russia

== Notable people ==
=== In antiquity and the pre-modern era ===
Chronological list.

- Eumaeus, character from Greek mythology. In Homer, Eumaeus tells of having been kidnapped as a child from Sidon, where his father was the king.
- Antipater of Sidon (2nd century BC), poet
- Zeno of Sidon (c. 150 – c. 75 BC), Epicurean philosopher born in Sidon
- Dorotheus of Sidon (1st century BC) Greek astrologer associated with Sidon
- Boethus of Sidon (c. 75 – c. 10 BC), peripatetic philosopher
- Tiberius Julius Abdes Pantera, Roman soldier who, according to his grave found in Germany in the 19th century, was born in Sidon
- Zenobius and his sister Zenobia, early-Christian martyrs executed around AD 290 under Diocletian
- Euthymios Saifi (1643–1723), Melkite Catholic Bishop of Sidon and Tyre
- Yusuf al-Asir (born 1232 AH = 1817 AD; died 1307 AH = 1889 AD), faqih, Islamic scholar, writer, poet, linguist, and journalist

=== In the modern era ===
- Fayza Ahmed (Al-Rawwass), Arab singer formerly based in Egypt
- Afif al-Bizri, (Afif El-Bizri) former Chief of Staff of the Syrian armed forces with a high-standing military rank and political profile during the Syria-Egypt republican union of the Nasser era.
- Raymond Audi, international banker, and former Minister of Refugees in the government of Lebanon.
- Nazih El-Bizri, longstanding politician, and notable physician: mayor of Sidon from 1952 till 1959, Member of Lebanese Parliament from 1953 till 1958 and from 1972 till 1992. Lebanese Minister of Health, and Minister of Social Affairs from 1955 till 1956, then from 1972 till 1973, and from 1980 till 1982.
- The Four Brothers - Riad El Bizri's Sons:
  - Ahmad El-Bizri, Salah-Eddine El-Bizri (Mayor of Sidon from 1937 till 1951. Member of Parliament from 1951 till 1953), Ezzedine El-Bizri, Anwar El-Bizri.
- Abdurrhman El-Bizri, Member of Parliament (2022 to date), notable physician, and former Mayor.
- Nader El-Bizri, international philosopher, architect.
- Hisham El-Bizri, international filmmaker.
- Bahia Hariri, former Minister of Education in the governments of Lebanon and philanthropist.
- Rafic Hariri, former Prime Minister, billionaire and international businessman.
- Bahaa Hariri, international businessman and billionaire, son of Rafic Hariri.
- Saad Hariri, youngest former Prime Minister of Lebanon.
- Ahmad Hijazi (born 1994), Lebanese footballer
- Bader Kawam (born 2006), Lebanese footballer
- Adel Osseiran, co-founder of modern Lebanon, was a prominent Lebanese statesman, a former Speaker of the Lebanese Parliament, and one of the founding fathers of the Lebanese Republic.
- Ali Osseiran, Member of Parliament and Former Minister
- Maarouf Saad, former deputy representing Sidon in the national parliament and founder of the Popular Nasserite Party.
- Ousama Saad, Member of Parliament (2022 to date), and leader of the Popular Nasserite Party.
- Fouad Siniora, former Prime Minister of Lebanon, minister of finance, and member of parliament.
- Riad Solh, former Prime Minister of Lebanon.
- Sami Solh, former Prime Minister of Lebanon.

== See also ==
- Abdalonymus – 4th-century BC King of Sidon
- Amarna letter EA 144
- King of Sidon – Ruler of Sidon
- Royal necropolis of Ayaa – Phoenician necropolis in Lebanon
- Sarcophagus of Eshmunazar II – 6th-century BC Phoenician royal coffin
- Sidon Eyalet – Administrative division of the Ottoman Empire from 1660 to 1864
- Sidon Mithraeum – Former mithraeum discovered in Sidon, kept in the Louvre
- Temple of Eshmun – Ancient temple to the Phoenician god of healing in Lebanon

== Sources ==
- Additional notes taken from Collier's Encyclopedia (1967 edition)
- Briant, Pierre (2002). From Cyrus to Alexander: A history of the Persian Empire. Winona Lake, IN: Eisenbrauns. ISBN 9781575061207.
- Elayi, Josette (1997). "Pouvoirs locaux et organisation du territoire des cités phéniciennes sous l'Empire perse achéménide" [Local authorities and organization of the territory of the Phoenician cities under the Persian Achaemenid Empire]. Espacio, Tiempo y Forma. 2, Historia antigua (in French). 10. Editorial UNED: 63–77. OCLC 758903288. Archived from the original on 4 October 2023.
- Runciman, Steven (1987). A History of the Crusades. Vol. 3: The Kingdom of Acre and the Later Crusades. Cambridge University Press. ISBN 9780521347723.
- Tucker, Spencer C. (2019). Middle East Conflicts from Ancient Egypt to the 21st Century: An Encyclopedia and Document Collection. ABC-CLIO. ISBN 978-1-440-85353-1.
