= Kanaanäische und Aramäische Inschriften =

Source for Canaanite and Aramaic inscriptions

Kanaanäische und Aramäische Inschriften (in English, Canaanite and Aramaic Inscriptions), or KAI, is the standard source for the original text of Canaanite and Aramaic inscriptions not contained in the Hebrew Bible.

It was first published from 1960 to 1964 in three volumes by the German orientalists Herbert Donner and Wolfgang Röllig, and has been updated in numerous subsequent editions.

The work attempted to "integrate philology, palaeography and cultural history" in the commented re-editing of a selection of Canaanite and Aramaic Inscriptions, using the "pertinent source material for the Phoenician, Punic, Moabite, pre-exile-Hebrew and Ancient Aramaic cultures." Röllig and Donner had the support of William F. Albright in Baltimore, James Germain Février in Paris and Giorgio Levi Della Vida in Rome during the compilation of the first edition.

== Editions ==
The 4th edition was published between 1966 and 1969, and a 5th edition was published in 2002. However, the 5th edition only comprised the first volume (showing the texts in modern Hebrew script), expanding the previous edition by 40 texts. An updated version of the third volume (a brief bibliography of all the texts in Volume 1) was proposed.

The first edition was intended to represent all the known texts of significant importance, but not to be a complete collection to replace the Corpus Inscriptionum Semiticarum. With respect to Aramaic inscriptions, all stone inscriptions until the Achaemenid Empire were included, whereas Imperial Aramaic inscriptions are only partially represented. Less emphasis was put on Aramaic papyri, ostraca and clay tablets, as such collections either already existed or were being prepared elsewhere. The included papyri and ostraca were chosen in order to provide and objective rounding of the picture, such as if they were published in a remote location. Nabataean and Palmyrene inscriptions were excluded, as were most of the Elephantine papyri.

The inscriptions were ordered geographically, and then chronologically within each geography; a division was made between “Punic” and “Neo Punic” that was acknowledged to be subjective.

In the second edition, four new texts were added - the fourth of the Karatepe inscriptions (KAI 26), and the three new texts (KAI 277-279). In the fifth edition, 40 new texts were added, primarily because they were only discovered or published after the appearance of the original edition or - like the Agrigentum inscription (KAI 302) - were given a new relevance due to a recent interpretation.

Two groups of new texts were not included in the fifth edition: new Hebrew inscriptions, which were considered to have been well summarized in J. Renz / W. Röllig, Handbuch der Althebraische Epigraphik (Darmstadt 1995-2002) and the Imperial Aramaic texts from Egypt, which were considered to have been well summarized in the Textbook of Aramaic Documents from Ancient Egypt.

== Phoenician inscriptions ==
=== A.I: From "the Motherland" (KAI 1-22, 280-286) ===
Byblos

- KAI 1: Ahiram Sarcophagus
- KAI 2: Byblos Necropolis graffito
- KAI 3: Byblos bronze spatulas
- KAI 4: Yehimilk inscription
- KAI 5: Abiba’l inscription (RES 505)
- KAI 6: Osorkon Bust
- KAI 7: Safatba'al inscription
- KAI 8: Abda sherd graffito
- KAI 9: Son of Shipitbaal inscription
- KAI 10: Yehawmilk Stele (CIS I 1)
- KAI 11: Batnoam inscription
- KAI 12: Byblos altar inscription
- KAI 14: Sarcophagus of Eshmunazar II (CIS I 3)
- KAI 17: Phoenician dedication to Astarte
- KAI 280: Byblos marble inscription (Byblos 13, RES 1202)

Sidon

- KAI 13: Tabnit sarcophagus (RES 1202)
- KAI 14: Sarcophagus of Eshmunazar II (CIS I 3, RES 1506)
- KAI 15-16: Bodashtart inscriptions (RES 766-767)
- KAI 281: Baalshillem Temple Boy
- KAI 282: Abdmiskar cippus (RES 930)

Tyre

- KAI 17: Throne of Astarte (RES 800)

Umm al-Amad

- KAI 18: Baalshamin inscription (CIS I 7)

Masub

- KAI 19: Masub inscription (RES 1205)

Roueisseh

- KAI 20-22: Phoenician arrowheads

Sarafand

- KAI 285: Sarepta Tanit inscription

Tel Miqne

- KAI 286: Ekron Royal Dedicatory Inscription

=== A.II: From Syria and Asia Minor (KAI 23-29, 287) ===
Sam'al

- KAI 23: Hasanbeyli inscription
- KAI 24: Kilamuwa Stela
- KAI 25: Kilamuwa scepter

Karatepe

- KAI 26: Karatepe bilingual

Arslan Tash

- KAI 27: Arslan Tash amulets
- KAI 28: Carchemish Phoenician inscription
- KAI 29: Ur Box inscription

Çebel Ires Daǧı

- KAI 287: Çebel Ires Daǧı inscription

=== A.III: From the islands (KAI 30-47, 288-292) ===
Cyprus

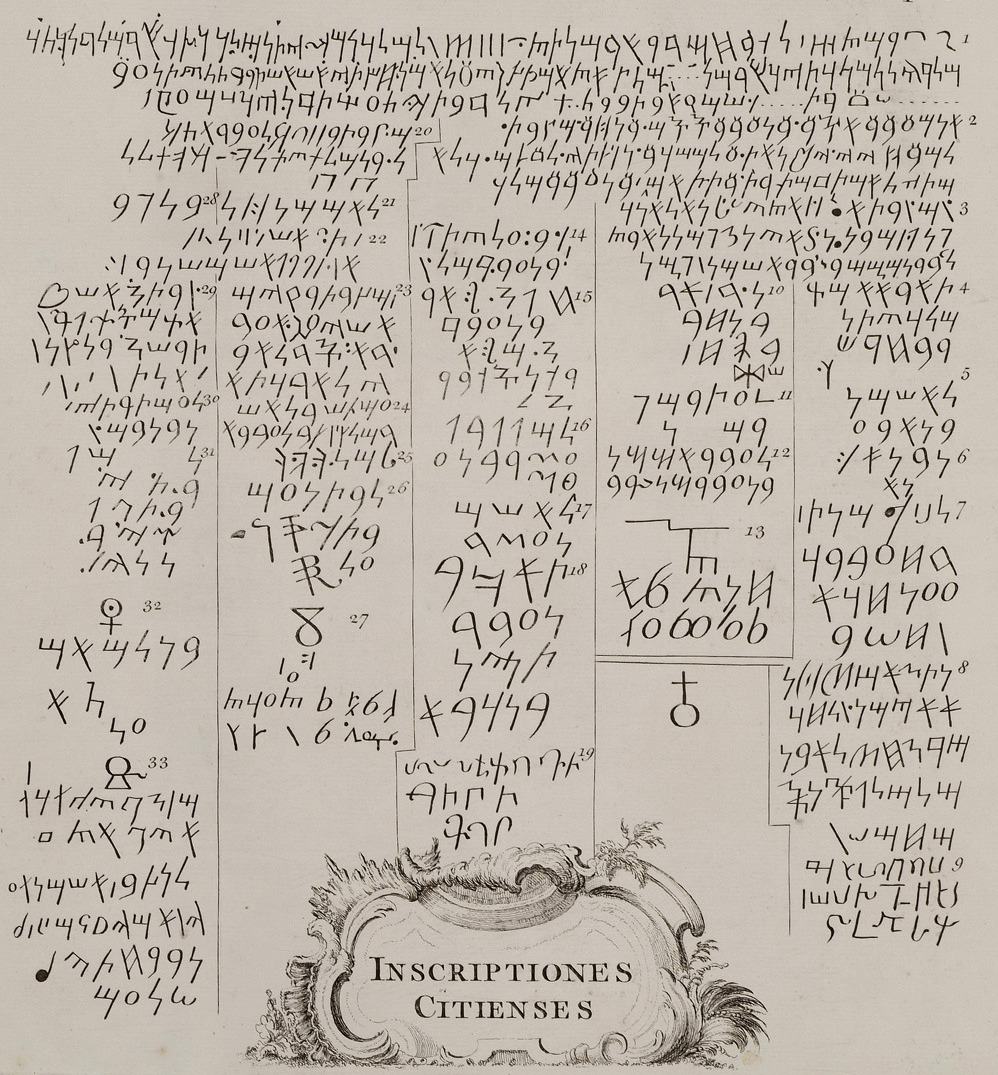
The Kition Inscriptions, published by Richard Pococke in 1745. In describing Kition, Pococke wrote: "the walls seem to have been very strong, and in the foundations there have been found many stones, with inscriptions on them, in an unintelligible character, which I suppose, is the antient [sic] Phoenician..."

- KAI 30: Archaic Cyprus inscription (origin unknown)
- KAI 31: Baal Lebanon inscription (Limassol) (CIS I 5)
- KAI 32: Kition Resheph pillars (CIS I 10, 88)
- KAI 33, 35: Pococke Kition inscriptions (CIS I 11, 46, 57–85)
- KAI 34: Kition Necropolis Phoenician inscriptions (RES 1206)
- KAI 36: Kellia inscription (CIS I 47)
- KAI 37: Kition Tariffs (CIS I 86A-B, 87)
- KAI 38-40: Idalium (KAI 39 = Idalion bilingual) (CIS I 89-94)
- KAI 41: Tamassos bilinguals (RES 1212-1213)
- KAI 42: Anat Athena bilingual (CIS I 95, RES 1515)
- KAI 43: Larnakas tis Lapithou pedestal inscription (RES 1211)
- KAI 46: Nora Stone (CIS I 144)
- KAI 288-290: Later Kition inscriptions

Rhodes

- KAI 44-45: Rhodes inscriptions

Sardinia

- KAI 46: Nora Stone (CIS I 144)

Malta

- KAI 47: Cippi of Melqart (CIS I 122)

Crete

- KAI 291: Tekke Bowl Inscription (Knossos)

Kos

- KAI 292: Hellenistic Greek-Phoenician bilingual

=== A.IV: From Egypt (KAI 48-52) ===
- KAI 48: Memphis inscription (RES 1, 235)
- KAI 49: Abydos inscription (CIS I 99-110)
- KAI 50-51: Phoenician papyrus letters
- KAI 52: Phoenician Harpocrates statues (RES 1507)

=== A.V: From Greece (KAI 53-60, 293) ===
- KAI 53-55: Athens inscriptions (CIS I 115-117)
- KAI 56-60: Piraeus inscriptions (CIS I 118-120)
- KAI 293: Demetrias inscription

=== A.Addition: From mainland Europe (KAI 277, 294) ===
- KAI 277: Pyrgi Tablets
- KAI 294: Seville statue of Astarte

== Punic inscriptions ==
=== B.I: From the islands (KAI 61-68, 295-301) ===
- KAI 61: Mdina steles (CIS I 123A-B)
- KAI 62: Gozo stele (CIS I 132)
- KAI 63: Lilybaeum stele (CIS I 138)
- KAI 64: Bashamem inscription (CIS I 139)
- KAI 65: Giardino Birocchi inscription
- KAI 66: Pauli Gerrei trilingual inscription (CIS I 143)
- KAI 67: Tharros Punic inscriptions (CIS I 158)
- KAI 68: Olbia pedestal (RES 1216)
- KAI 295: Grotta Regina Punic inscriptions
- KAI 296-298: Mozia Punic inscriptions
- KAI 299-301: Temple of Antas Punic inscriptions

=== B.II. From mainland Europe (KAI 69-72) ===
- KAI 69: Marseille Tariff (CIS I 165)
- KAI 70: Avignon Punic inscription (RES 360)
- KAI 71: Cadiz Phoenician inscription
- KAI 72: Ibiza Phoenician inscriptions

=== B.III. From Africa (KAI 73-116, 302-305) ===
Carthage

- KAI 73: Douïmès medallion (CIS I 6057, RES 5)
- KAI 74: Carthage tariff (CIS I 167)
- KAI 76: Carthage Festival inscription (CIS I 166)
- KAI 78: Mitsri genealogy inscription (CIS I 3778)
- KAI 79: KNMY inscription (CIS I 3785)
- KAI 82: Persephone Punic stele (CIS I 176)
- KAI 84: Son of Baalshillek marble base (CIS I 178)
- KAI 85: Carthaginian tombstones (CIS I 184)
- KAI 86-88: Pricot de Sainte-Marie steles (CIS I 264, 221, 1885)
- KAI 89: Punic Tabella Defixionis (CIS I 6068)
- KAI 92: Sibbolet funeral inscription (CIS I 5948, RES 768)
- KAI 97-98: Hadrumetum Punic inscriptions
- KAI 100-101: Punic-Libyan bilinguals
- KAI 102-116: Cirta steles
- KAI 302: Agrigentum inscription (CIS I 5510)
- KAI 303: Carthage Administration Inscription
- KAI 304-305: Tripolitania Punic inscriptions

Cirta

- KAI 102-105: Lazare Costa inscriptions
- KAI 106-116: El Hofra inscriptions

== Neopunic inscriptions ==
=== C.I: From Africa (KAI 117-171) ===
- KAI 117: El Amrouni mausoleum
- KAI 118-132: Tripolitania Punic inscriptions (RES 662)
- KAI 133-135: Bourgade inscriptions
- KAI 137: Thinissut sanctuary inscription (RES 942, 1858)
- KAI 138: Bur Tlelsa Neopunic inscription
- KAI 139: Bordj Helal Neopunic inscription
- KAI 141: Jebel Massoudj Neopunic inscription
- KAI 142: Henchir Brigitta inscription
- KAI 143-144: Henchir Guergour Neopunic inscriptions
- KAI 145-158: Maktar and Mididi inscriptions (RES 161-181, 2221)
- KAI 159: Altiburus (Henchir Medeina) inscription
- KAI 161: Cherchell Neopunic inscriptions
- KAI 162-164: Cirta steles
- KAI 165: Guelaât Bou Sbaâ Neopunic inscriptions
- KAI 166-169: Ain Nechma inscriptions
- KAI 170: Djinet Neopunic inscriptions
- KAI 171: Zattara Neopunic inscriptions

=== C.II: From Sardinia (KAI 172-173) ===
- KAI 172: Sant'Antioco bilingual (CIS I 149)
- KAI 173: Bithia inscription

== D. Moabite and Ammonite inscriptions (KAI 181, 306, 307-308) ==
- KAI 181: Mesha Stele
- KAI 306: El-Kerak Inscription
- KAI 307: Amman Citadel Inscription
- KAI 308: Tel Siran inscription

== E. Hebrew inscriptions (KAI 182-200) ==
- KAI 182: Gezer calendar (RES 1201)
- KAI 183-188: Samaria Ostraca
- KAI 189: Siloam inscription
- KAI 190: Ophel ostracon
- KAI 191: Shebna inscription
- KAI 192-199: Lachish letters
- KAI 200: Yavne-Yam ostracon

== F. Aramaic inscriptions ==
=== F.I: From Syria, Palestine and the Arabian Desert (KAI 201-230, 309-317) ===
Bureij

- KAI 201: Melqart stele

Tell Afis

- KAI 202: Stele of Zakkur

Sam'al

- KAI 214: Hadad statue — in a distinctive language now known as Samalian.
- KAI 215: Panamuwa II inscription
- KAI 216-221: Bar-Rakib inscriptions

As-Safira

- KAI 222-224: Sefire steles
- KAI 227: Starcky Tablet — possibly from As-Safira

Tayma

- KAI 228-230: Tayma stones (CIS II 113–115)

Al-Nayrab

- KAI 225-226: Neirab Steles — Sin zir Ibni inscription and Si Gabbor stele

Tell Fekheriye

- KAI 309: Tell Fekheriye bilingual inscription

Tel Dan

- KAI 310: Tel Dan Stele

Samos

- KAI 311: Hazael horse frontlet

Deir Alla

- KAI 312: Deir Alla Inscription — not generally accepted as Aramaic.

=== F.II: From Assyria (KAI 231-257) ===
- KAI 231: Tell Halaf inscription
- KAI 232: Arslan Tash ivory inscription
- KAI 233-236: Assur ostracon and tablets
- KAI 237-257: Hatran inscriptions

=== F.III: From Asia Minor (KAI 258-265, 278, 318-319) ===
- KAI 258: Kesecek Köyü inscription
- KAI 259: Gözne Boundary Stone
- KAI 260: Sardis bilingual inscription
- KAI 261: Sarıaydın inscription
- KAI 262: Limyra bilingual inscription (CIS II 109)
- KAI 263: Assyrian lion weights (CIS II 108)
- KAI 264: Arebsun inscription
- KAI 265: Farasa bilingual inscription
- KAI 318: Daskyleion steles
- KAI 319: Letoon trilingual

=== F.IV: From Egypt (KAI 266-272) ===
- KAI 266: Adon Papyrus
- KAI 267: Saqqara Aramaic Stele (CIS II 122)
- KAI 268: Serapeum Offering Table (CIS II 123)
- KAI 269: Carpentras Stele (CIS II 141)
- KAI 270: Dream ostracon (CIS II 137)
- KAI 271: Elephantine papyri and ostraca (CIS II 138)
- KAI 272: Ankh-Hapy stele (CIS II 142)

=== F.V: From the outlying areas (KAI 273-276, 279, 320) ===
- KAI 273: Aramaic Inscription of Taxila
- KAI 274-275: Lake Sivan Inscriptions
- KAI 276: Stele of Serapit
- KAI 279: Kandahar Bilingual Rock Inscription
- KAI 320: Bukan inscription

== Appendices ==
=== Appendix II. Latin-Libyan inscriptions (KAI 178-180) ===
- KAI 180: Sirte inscription

== Bibliography ==
- Pardee, Dennis (2006). "Kanaanäische und aramäische Inschriften. 5th ed., rev. by Herbert Donner and Wolfgang Röllig. Wiesbaden: Harrassowitz Verlag, 2002". Journal of Near Eastern Studies. 65 (2). jstor.org: 155–156. doi:10.1086/505010. JSTOR 10.1086/505010.
- "TM Bibliography". trismegistos.org.
- W. Röllig (1995), Phoenician and the Phoenicians in the context of the Ancient Near East, in S. Moscati (ed.), I Fenici ieri oggi domani : ricerche, scoperte, progetti, Roma, p. 203-214

== See also ==
- Corpus Inscriptionum Semiticarum
- Keilschrift Texte aus Ugarit
- Canaanite and Aramaic inscriptions
