= Olbia pedestal =

Punic language inscription

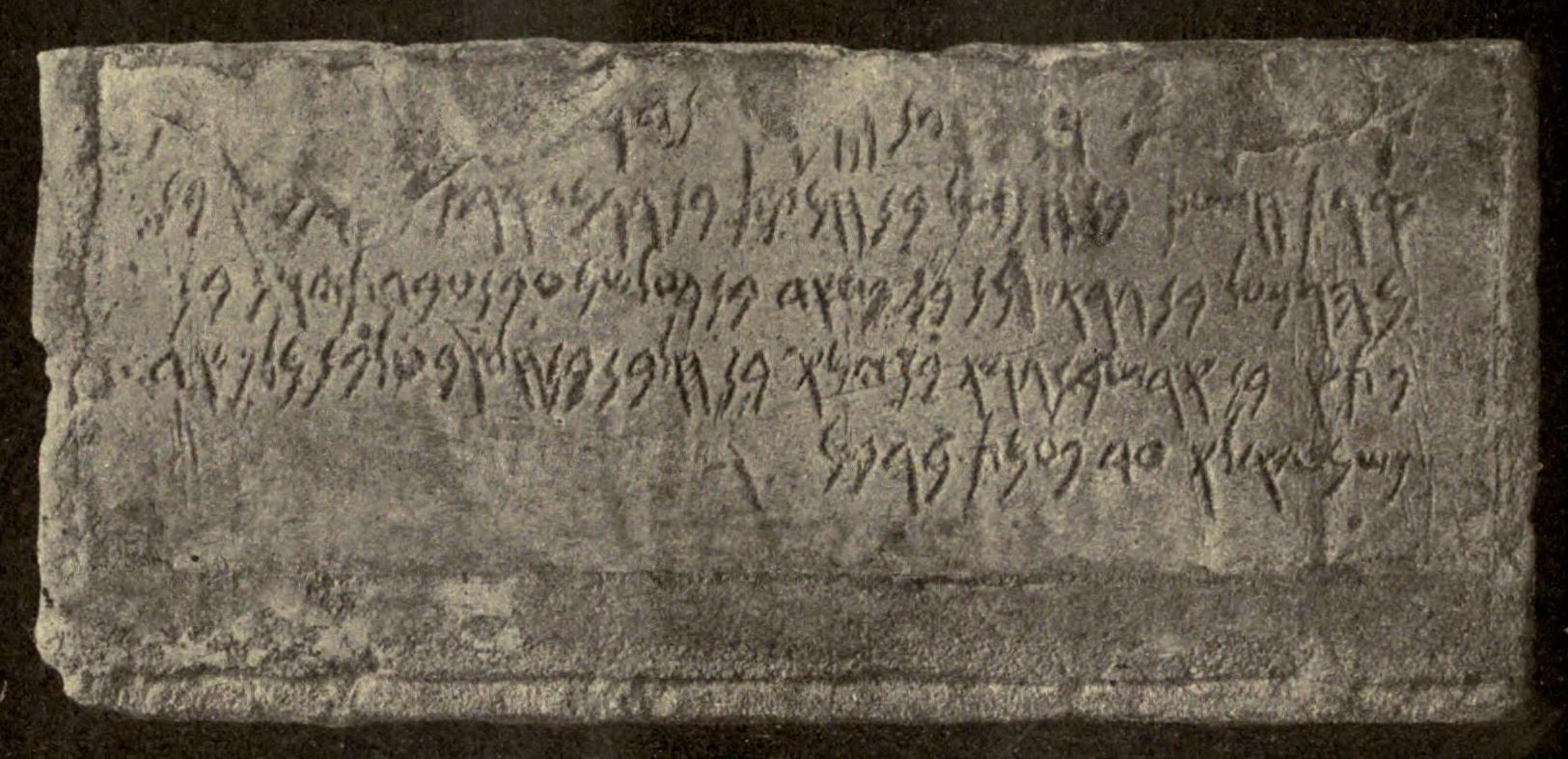
- 1911 copy of the inscription
- Writing: Punic
- Discovered: 1911

The Olbia pedestal is a Punic language inscription from the [third] century BCE, found 1911 at Olbia in Sardinia.

It was first assessed by Italian orientalist Ignazio Guidi.

It was first published by Jean-Joseph-Léandre Bargès, and is known as KAI 68 and R 1216.

It was originally held in the Sassari Archeological Museum, but today is held on display at the Museo Archeologico di Olbia.

== Discovery ==
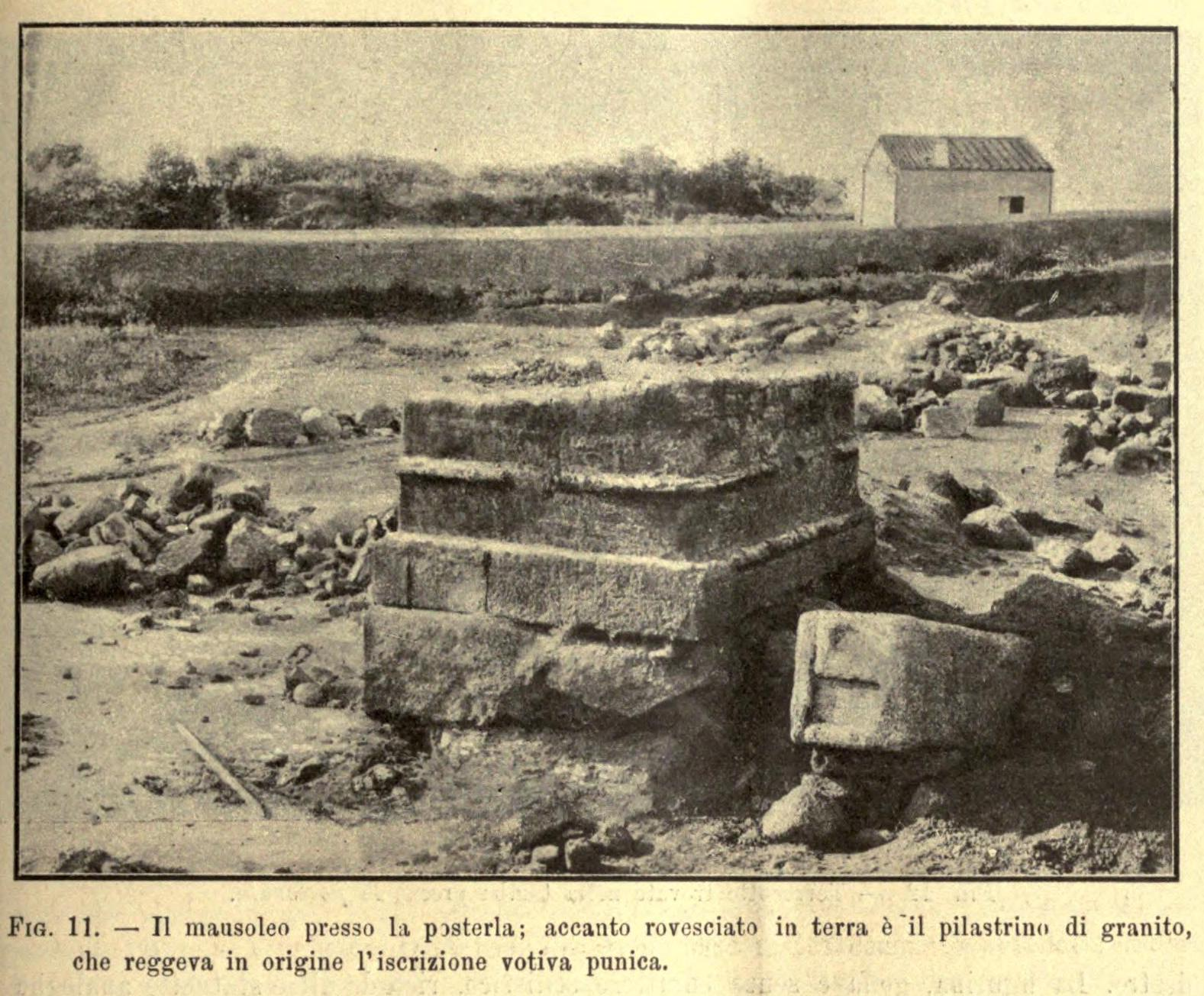
Image showing the fallen granite pillar on which the inscription was found (bottom right). The carved rectangle where the inscription used to be can be seen.

During the 1911 excavations of the city of Olbia (then named "Terranova Pausania") led by Antonio Taramelli, the fragments of a small pyramid-shaped arula were found on a rectangular pillar next to "tower B". The pillar was found to have a Punic inscription on its granite base. It was found in a location where a tomb was erected in Roman times.

== Inscription ==
The inscription is damaged in the first line, just the name of the god or person it was devoted to has been lost.

The script is considered similar to that of the Carthaginian tombstones inscriptions, and was dated to the 3rd century BCE.

Ignazio Guidi wrote that "Although mutilated, the inscription is remarkable for the time it refers to, which corresponds to the period of the absolute domination of the city of Carthage in Olbia, for the mention of Carthage that we see in the inscription itself, for the series of names which belong to those common in the Punic metropolis. Hannibal, Himilkat, Germelkart, Maharbal and the others are common to the Punic name: the name of Ariš recently appeared also in an amphora with a painted inscription, found in the last excavations of the Cagliari necropolis. The inscription therefore attests to the existence of cults and places of worship in the city of Olbia, and increases the hope that systematic excavations can provide new elements on Carthaginian rule in the city of Olbia."

== Bibliography ==
- Antonio Taramelli, Terranova Pausania, Sardinia: Avanzi dell'antica Olbia, rimessi a luce in occasione dei lavori di bonifica, Notizie degli scavi di antichità, 1911, fascicolo 5, pages 223-243
- Campus, Alessandro (2014-11-25). "Una genealogia punica: l'iscrizione ICO Sard. 34, in Da Olbìa a Olbia. 2500 anni di storia di una città mediterranea. Atti del convegno internazionale di Studi (Olbia, 12-14 maggio 1994), Sassari 1996, I, pp. 207-217". Academia.edu (in Italian).
