= Guelaât Bou Sbaâ Neopunic inscriptions =

Pair of Neopunic inscriptions from northeastern Algeria

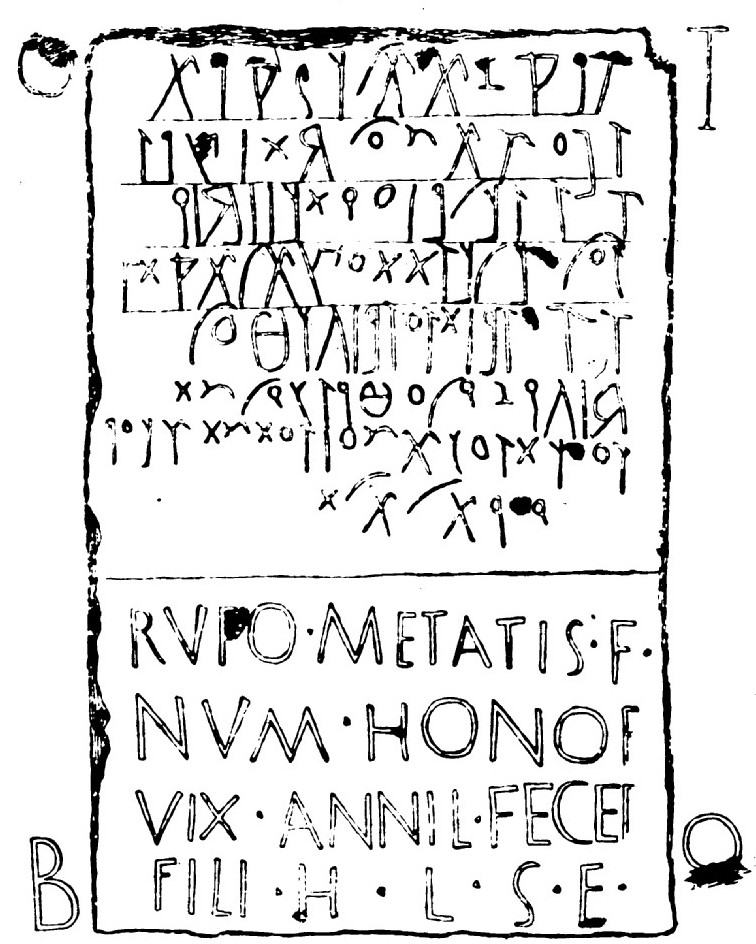
The bilingual inscription

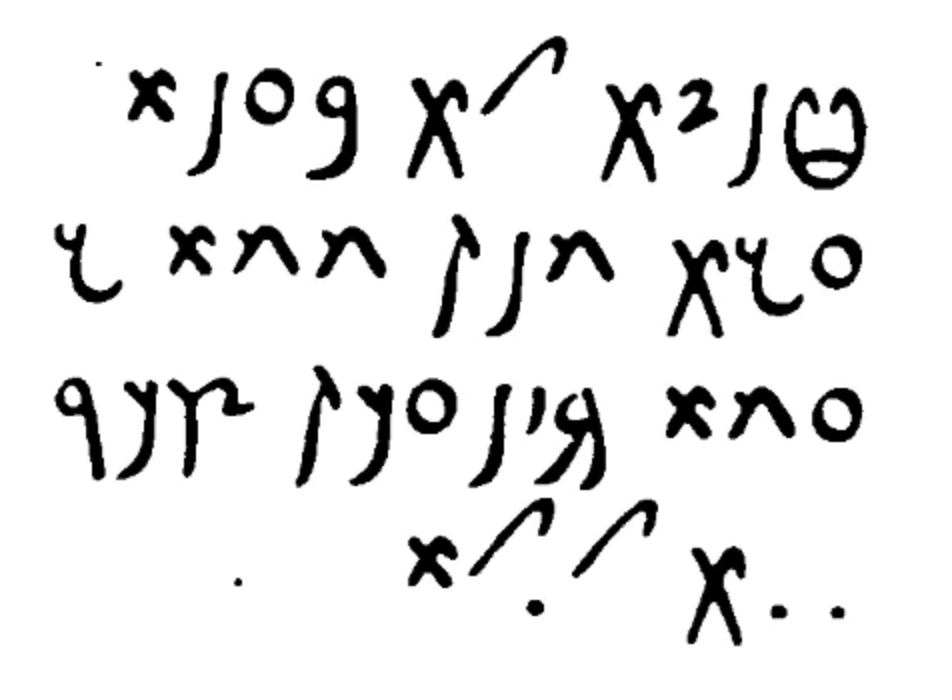
The second inscription

The Guelaât Bou Sbaâ Neopunic inscriptions are two Neopunic inscriptions – one bilingual with Latin – discovered in 1882–84 in Guelaât Bou Sbaâ, about 10 km from Guelma in Algeria.

The bilingual inscription is known as KAI 165, with the Latin part known as CIL 17467. They have been compared to the Ain Nechma inscriptions found nearby.

== Bilingual inscription ==
The bilingual inscriptions were discovered at the end of 1884 by workers digging up a vine on the property of a Mr. Boivin, a notary living in Guelma. The bilingual is oblong in shape and measures 89 x 28 x 26 cm. It was first published in 1886 by Alexandre Napier, the curator of the Annaba Museum (Musée de Bône, the predecessor of the Musée d'Hippone).

It was published again in 1916 by Jean-Baptiste Chabot after he had been sent a stamping by Stéphane Gsell. As of 1916, the bilingual inscription was embedded in the wall of a house, near where it was discovered.

== Reboud inscription ==
The other inscription, measuring 32 x 24 cm, was discovered in 1882 and reported by Dr. Victor Constant Reboud in the Recueil des notices et mémoires de la Société archéologique de la province de Constantine; it was then kept at the local presbytery. It was published in 1886 by Alexandre Papier with the bilingual above.
