= Giardino Birocchi inscription =

Punic inscription

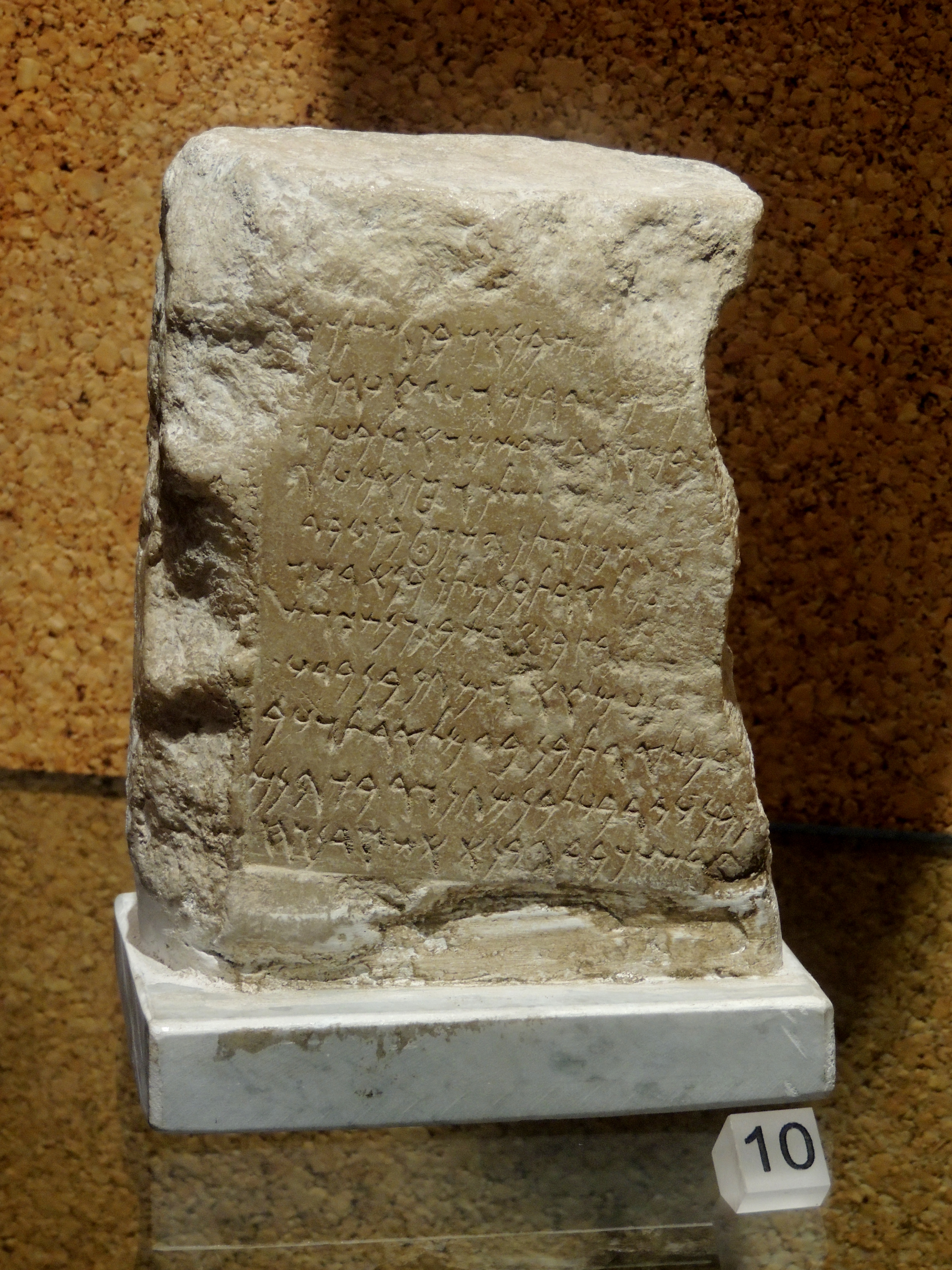
Giardino Birocchi inscription

The Giardino Birocchi inscription is a Punic inscription on a marble block with 11 lines of text found near the Chiesa della Santissima Annunziata in Cagliari in 1912. It was found in a garden belonging to Eusebio Birocchi. It is held today in the National Archaeological Museum, Cagliari.

It was not found in its primary context; it may have come from the Tuvixeddu necropolis. The beginnings of most of the 11 lines are damaged. Professor Ignazio Guidi published an initial translation.

It is also known as KAI 65.

== Bibliography ==
- Antonio Taramelli, 1913, Nuova iscrizione cartaginese rinvenuta nel giardino Birocchi, in località SS. Annunziata, Notizie degli scavi di antichità, p.87-89
- Jean-Baptiste Chabot, Nouvelle Inscription Punique de Sardaigne, Journal asiatique, 1917, p.5-11
- Mark Lidzbarski, Ephemeris für semitische Epigraphik, volume III, 1915: "Punica", p.283-284
