= Carchemish Phoenician inscription =

5th-century BC Phoenician inscription

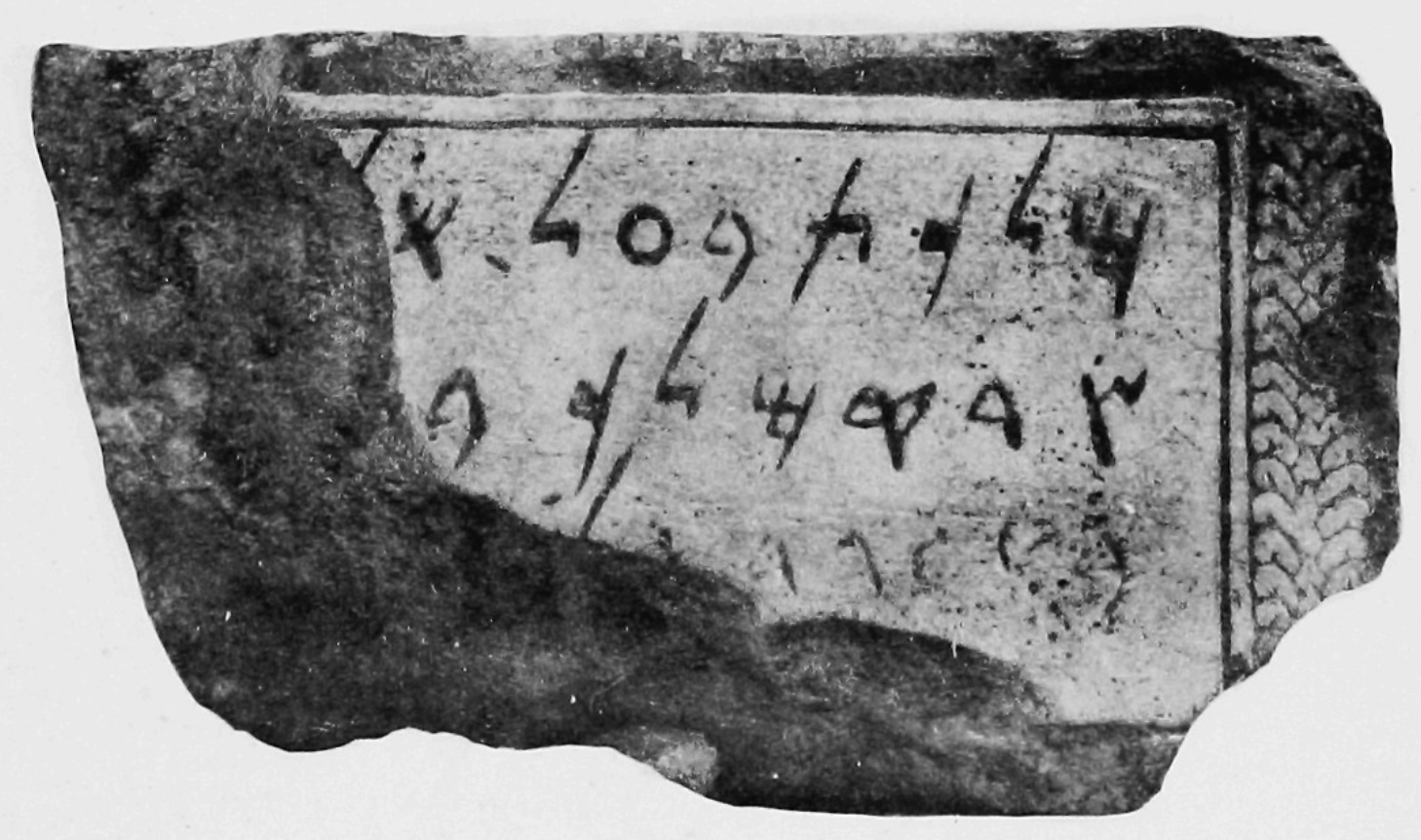
Carchemish Phoenician inscription

The Carchemish Phoenician inscription is a 5th-century BCE Phoenician inscription on glazed faience tile in Carchemish in the early 1950s during the excavations of Richard David Barnett and Leonard Woolley for the British Museum. It measured 9 x 4 cm, and was found in northwest end of the "Acropolis (or Citadel) Mount" in the northeast corner of the Carchemish mound (today on the Turkish side of the Syria–Turkey border).

It may not have belonged to the building, as it was found in the ruins rather than on the building itself. Barnett speculated that it may have been added as a later redecoration of the Kubaba Temple.

The inscription is in brown letters on a pale blue background, with a border of the tree of life; Barnett stated that the letters resembled those of the Sarcophagus of Eshmunazar II.

It is known as KAI 28.

== Bibliography ==
- Richard David Barnett and Leonard Woolley, Carchemish: report on the excavations at Jerablus on behalf of the British Museum. pt. 3: The Excavations of the inner town: The Hittite inscriptions, 1952, British Museum
- Kanaanäische und Aramäische Inschriften, number 28
