= Gozan Pedestal inscription =

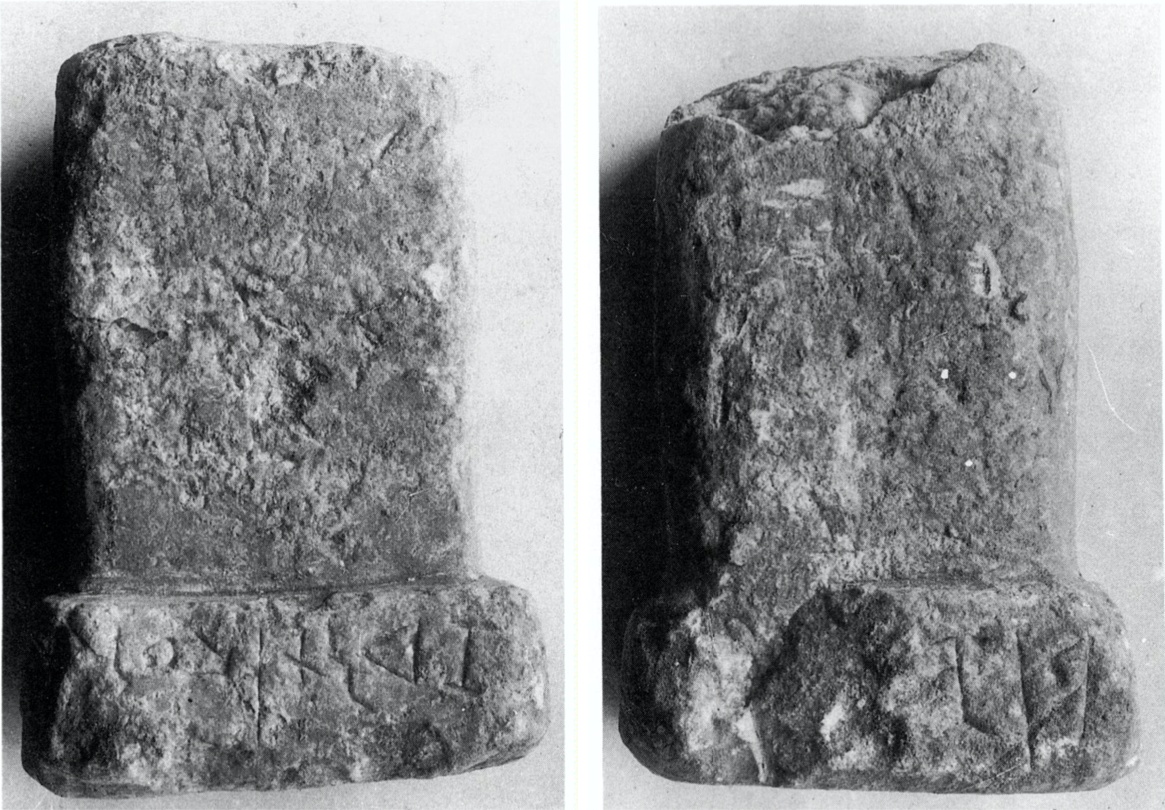
Photographs from the archive of the Free University of Berlin

The Gozan Pedestal inscription, also known as the Tell Halaf inscription, was an ancient Aramaic description discovered in Tell Halaf in 1933, and published in 1940. The inscription was on a limestone stele. It was destroyed in November 1943 during the Battle of Berlin, when a phosphorus bomb destroyed the Tell Halaf Museum.

The inscription is known as KAI 231.

== Bibliography ==
- Editio princeps: Die Inschriften vom Tell Halaf. Keilschrifttexte und aramäische Urkunden aus einer assyrischen Provinzhauptstadt. Herausgegeben und bearbeitet von Johannes Friedrich, Gerhard Rudolf Meyer, Arthur Ungnad, Ernst Friedrich Weidner, Archiv für Orientforschung Beiheft 6 (1940).
