= Kesecek Köyü inscription =

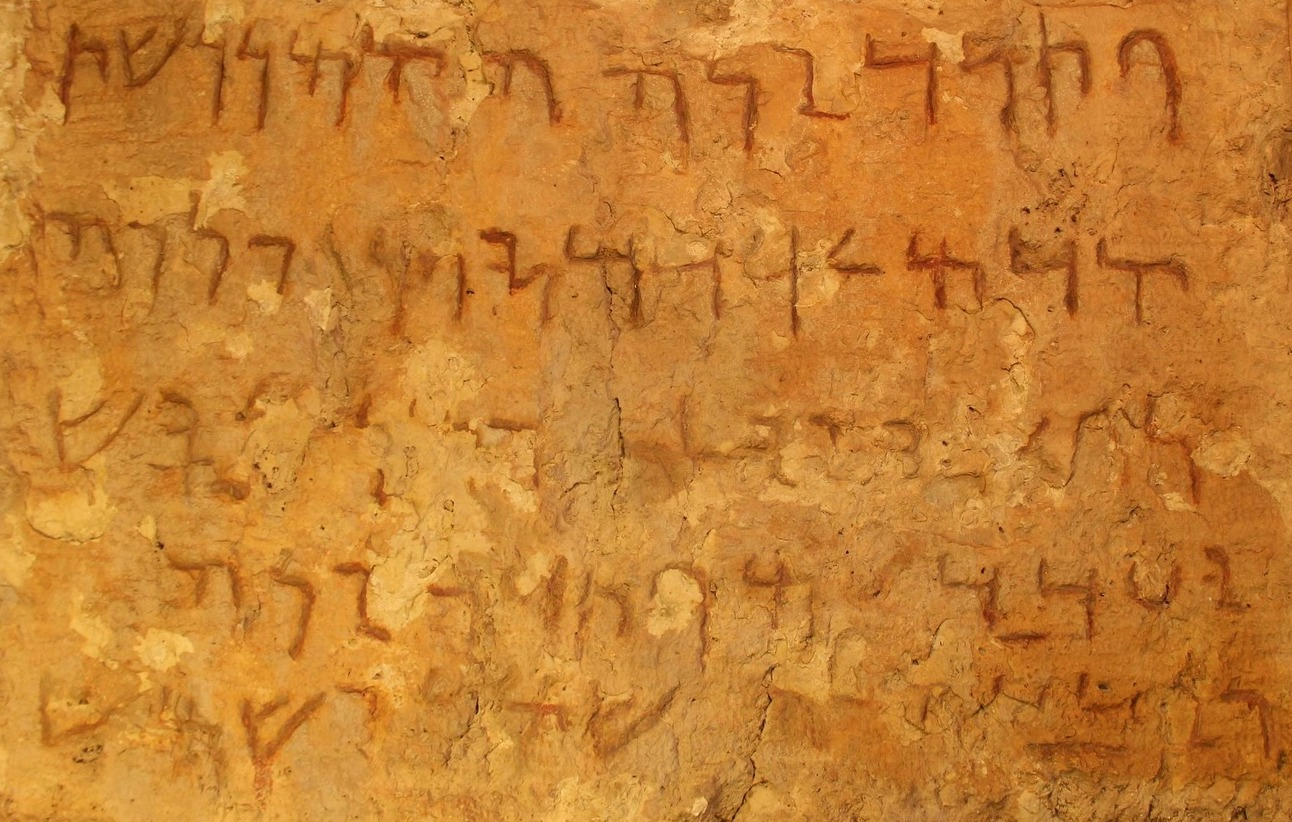
The inscription

The Kesecek Köyü inscription is a 4th century BCE Aramaic inscription originally located on the cliffs overlooking the Berdan River near the village of Kesecek Köyü about 25-35 km north-east of Tarsus, Mersin.

It is similar in nature to the Sarıaydın inscription.

== Text ==
One interpretation following clues from the Daskyleion inscription:

This relief NNŠT erected before ˀDRSWN to the end that he protect the tomb which belongs to him, and whoever does injury to this relief, let Śahar and Šamaš require (it) of him.

The inscription measures 46 cm wide by 30 cm high. It is known at KAI 258.

It is currently at the Peabody Museum of Natural History at Yale.

== Bibliography ==
- Charles Cutler Torrey, "An Aramaic Inscription from Cilicia, in the Museum of Yale University" JAOS 35 (1915): 370–74
- Hanson, R.S., "Aramaic Funerary and Boundary Inscriptions from Asia Minor." BASOR 192 (1968): 3–11. Kesecek Daskyleion LimBil GozBdSt
