= Assur ostracon and tablets =

Aramaic and Phoenician inscriptions

The Assur ostracon and tablets are a series of Aramaic or Phoenician inscriptions found during the 1903-13 excavations of Assur by the Deutsche Orient-Gesellschaft. It is considered the oldest evidence of writing Aramaic in cursive script.

They are currently in the Vorderasiatisches Museum Berlin (ostracon is V. A. 8384).

== Ostracon ==
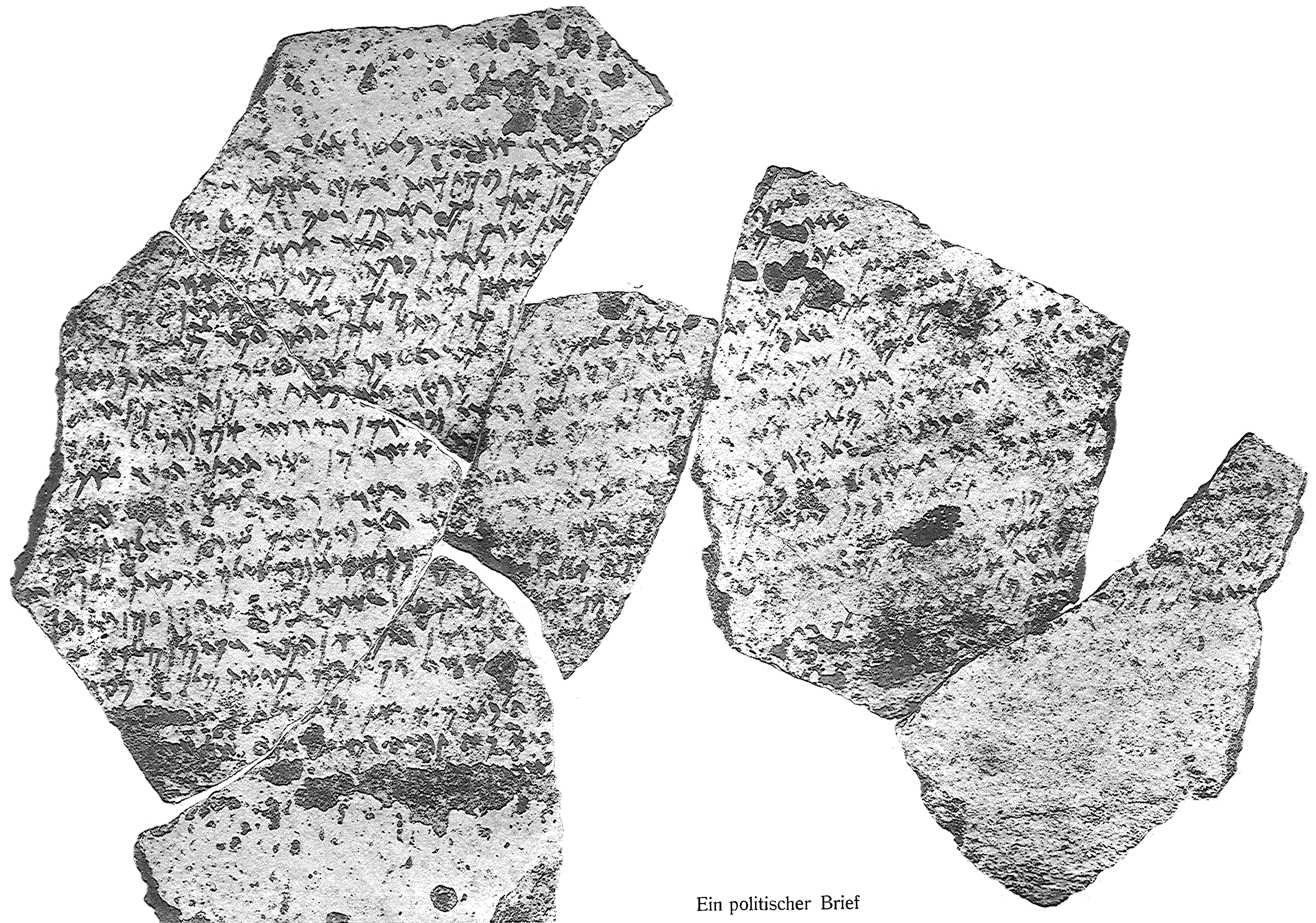
Assur ostracon

The ostracon was found in six fragments. It is thought to be a letter addressed by an Assyrian official to one of his colleagues. It is one of the earliest known examples of Aramaic cursive script, including ligatures.

It is the longest known Aramaic letter written on an ostracon.

It is also known as KAI 233.

Although decipherment has proven challenging, the inscription is considered to be structured in two parts:

- Lines 1-18: A letter from Assyrian official Bel-etir to another Assyrian official Pir’i-amurri, during the period of the rebellion of King Shamash-shum-ukin against his brother Ashurbanipal
- Lines 19-21: A letter from Bel-etir to another unidentifiable person

== Tablets ==
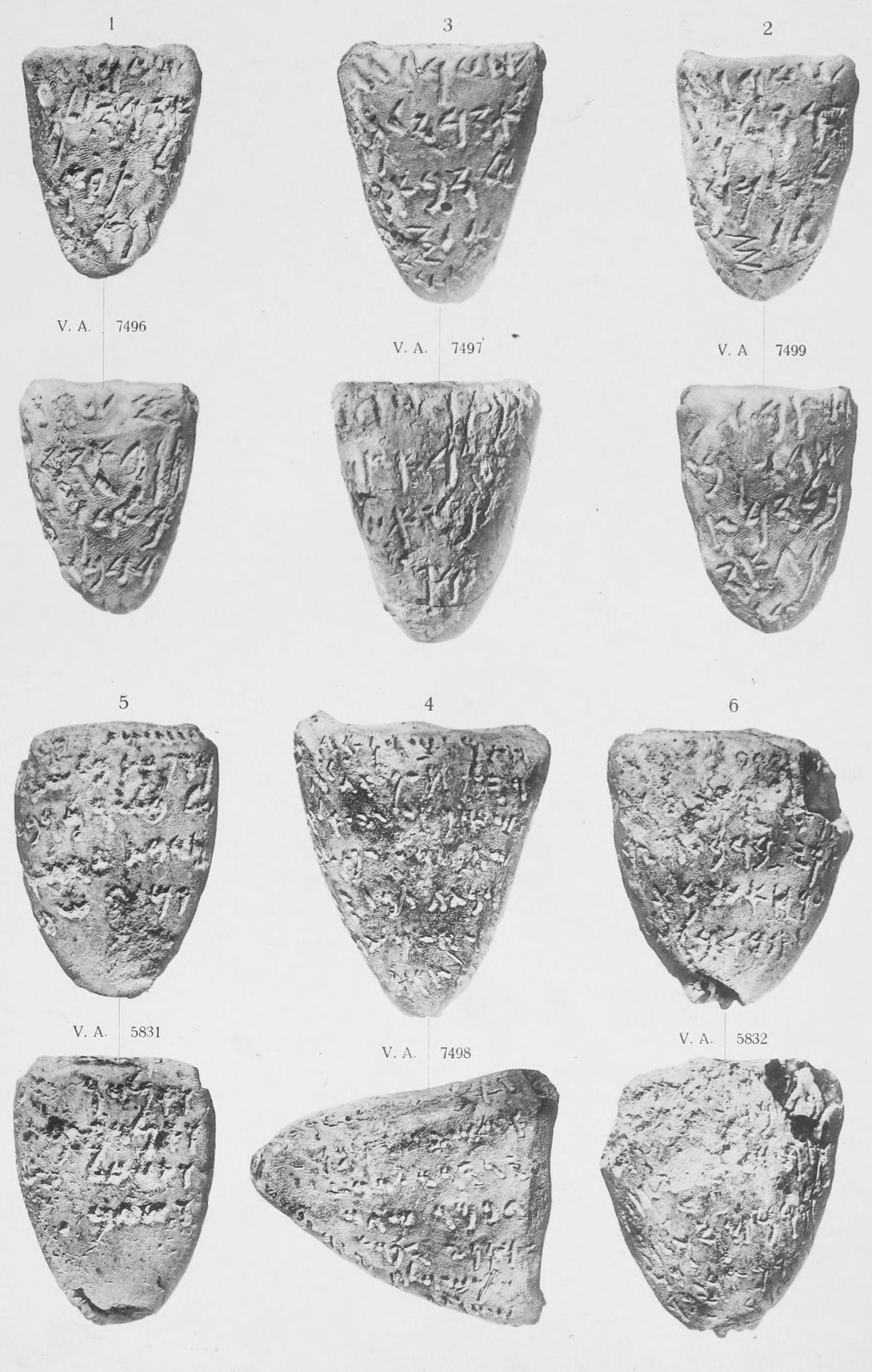
Assur Phoenician tablets

Nine Phoenician inscribed tablets were found during the same expedition. They are also known as KAI 234-236.

== Bibliography ==
- M. Lidzbarski, Altaramäische Urkunden aus Assur (Wissenschaftliche Veroffentlichung der deutschen Orient-Gesellschaft, 38; Leipzig: Hinrichs, 1921) 5-15.
- M. Lidzbarski, "Ein aramäischer Brief aus der Zeit Ašurbanipals," MDOG 58 (1917) 50-52 [preliminary report]
- D. H. Baneth, "Zu dem aramäischen Brief aus der Zeit Assurbanipals," OLZ 22 (1919) 55-58
- R. A. Bowman, "An Interpretation of the Assur Ostracon," Royal Correspondence of the Assyrian Empire (ed. L. Waterman; University of Michigan Studies, Humanistic Series, 20; Ann Arbor: University of Michigan), 4 (1936) 273-82;
- A. Dupont-Sommer, "Séance du 22 octobre," CRAIBL 1943, pp. 465-66;
- A. Dupont-Sommer, "L'ostracon araméen d'Assour," Syria 24 (1944-45) 24-61
