= Limyra bilingual inscription =

4th-century BCE Greek-Aramaic funerary inscription

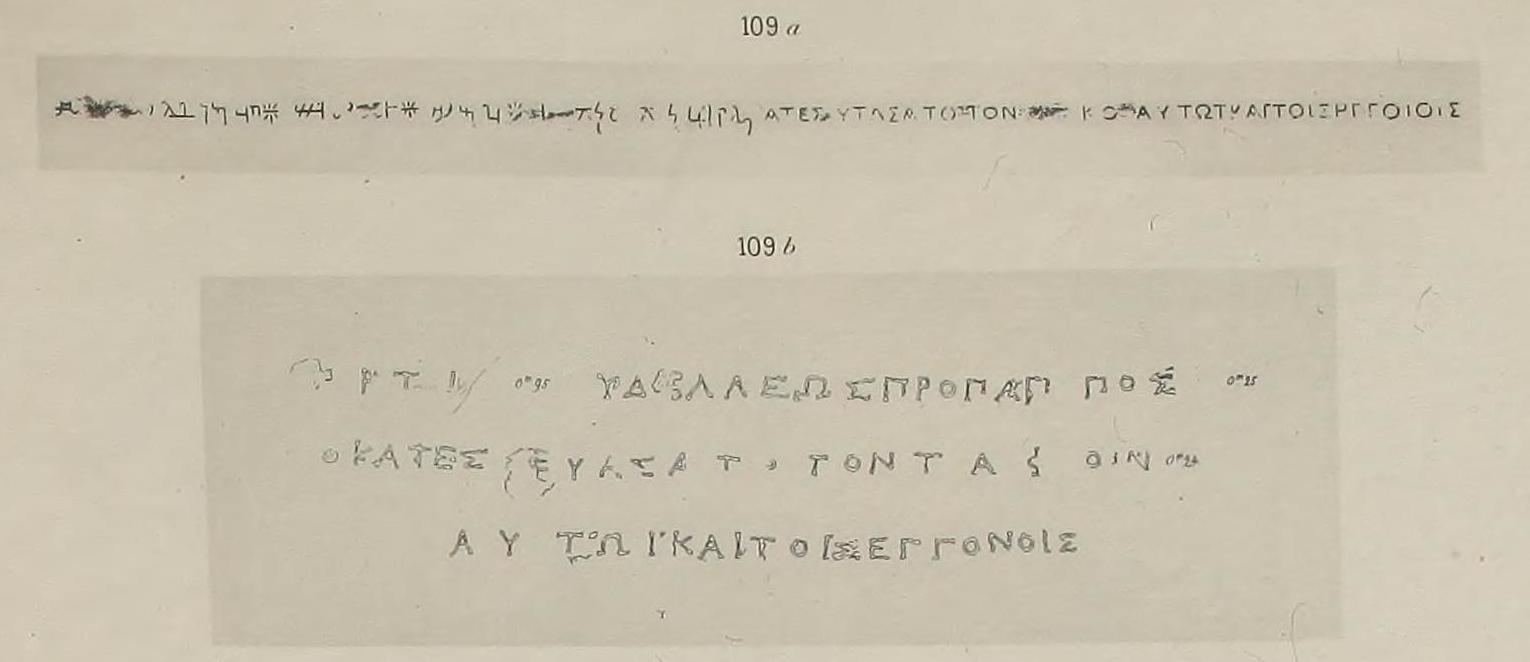
Corpus Inscriptionum Semiticarum CIS II 109 (Limyra bilingual sketch) (cropped)

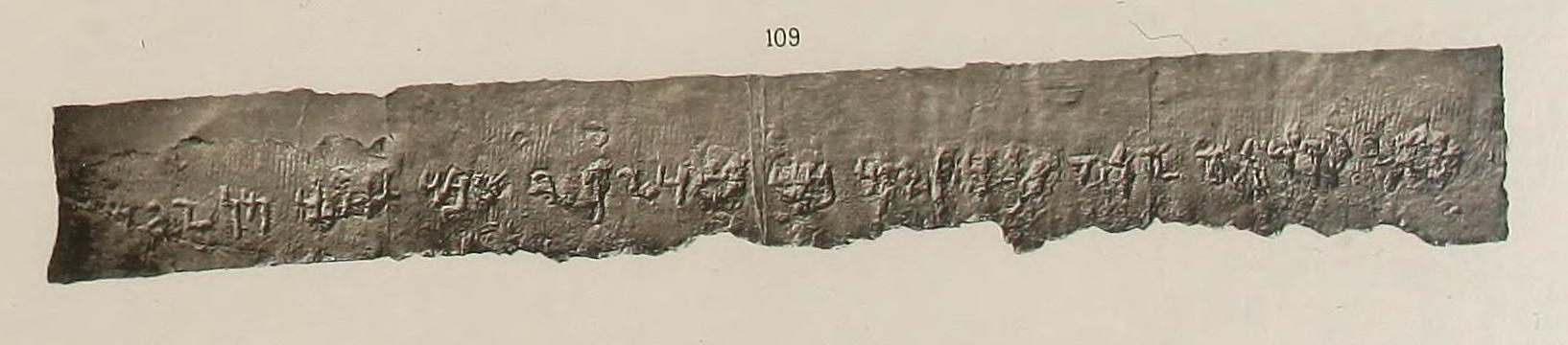
Corpus Inscriptionum Semiticarum CIS II 109 (Limyra bilingual) (cropped)

The Limyra bilingual inscription is a 4th-century BCE bilingual Greek-Aramaic funerary inscription discovered in 1840. It remains in situ, in Tomb No. 46 in the Limyra Necropolis CH V, 3km outside Limyra, in southwest Turkey. The double cut rock-cut tomb is Lycian in architectural style, and is the only tomb in the area with a bilingual inscription. The Aramaic inscription is on the lintel of the left opening, with the Greek inscription on the frieze above and across both doors.

The Aramaic inscription is known as KAI 262. An analysis of the inscription was first published in 1887 by Eduard Sachau.

== Bibliography ==
- Hanson, R. (1968). Aramaic Funerary and Boundary Inscriptions from Asia Minor. Bulletin of the American Schools of Oriental Research, (192), 3-11. doi:10.2307/1356398
- Lipinski, Edward, 1975, Studies in Aramaic Inscriptions and Onomastics I, OLA 1, Leuven : 162-171.
- Fellows, C., An Account of Discoveries in Lycia, Being a Journal Kept During a Second Excursion in Asia Minor, . London: J. Murray, 1841
- Sachau, E., "Eine altaramäische Inschrift aus Lycien." SKAWW 114 (1887): 3–7, pl. 1
- Darmesteter, J., "L'inscription araméenne de Limyra." JA 8/12 (1888): 508–10
- Perles, F., "Das Land Arzâph (IV Ezra 13, 45)." AfO 3 (1926): 120–21.
