= Sibbolet funeral inscription =

Punic-language inscription from Carthage

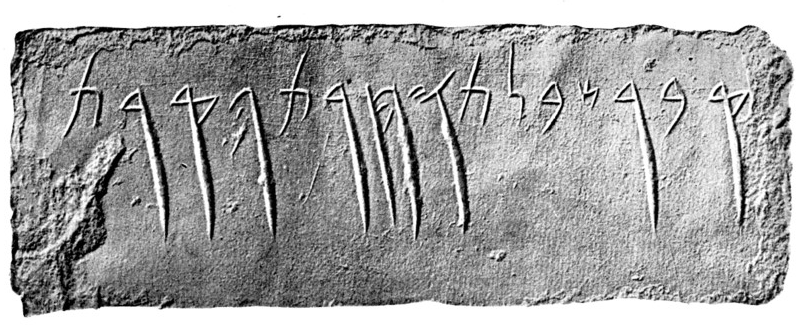
The Sibbolet funeral inscription

The Sibbolet funeral inscription is a Punic language inscription found in 1902 at Carthage. It measures 20 by 7 cm and is currently held at the Carthage National Museum. It is known as KAI 92, CIS I 5948, or R 768.

The inscription reads:

QBR ŠBLT SḤRT HQRT
Grave of ŠBLT (Sibbolet), businesswoman of the City

The inscription, on fine sandstone, is full of subtle contradictions. Though, because of its small size, it might seem unpretentious, its letters are executed with great care. In spite of her modest name—Sibbolet means "ear of grain", a cognate of Hebrew shibboleth—the woman claims to be "the wholesale merchant" of "the City", i.e. Carthage. She does not give names of her father or of any other ancestor, which suggests that she prides herself of being a self-made woman. The impression one gets is that of a woman who knows how to tactfully use all her social skills to achieve a glorious business career.

Remarkably the inscription does not mention the product that Sibbolet traded in. The French Orientalist Clermont-Ganneau has therefore suggested that she may have engaged in a less decent trade, for example slave trade (mangonium) or even pandering (lenocinium). On the other hand, the Polish scholar Lidzbarski has suggested that her trade was of a religious nature.

Clermont-Ganneau also suggested that HQRT (haqqart, 'the City') might refer not to Carthage but to Cirta (today's Constantine), where the name Sibbolet has been attested. Lidzbarski thinks the identification with Carthage is correct.
