= Thinissut sanctuary inscription =

Punic inscription

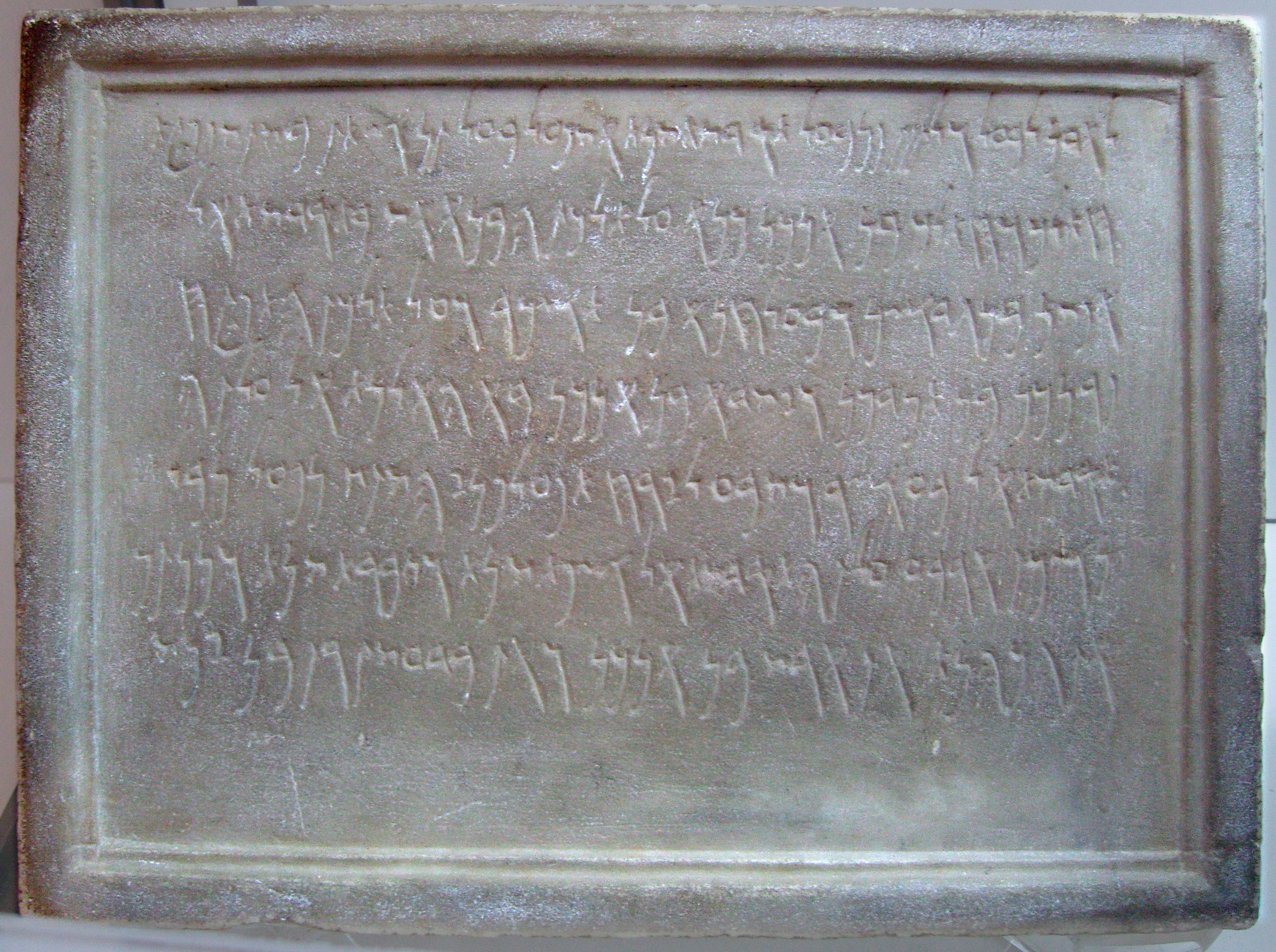
The inscription

As published in 1909 in Alfred Merlin's La nécropole punique d'Ard el-Kheraīb à Carthage

The Thinissut sanctuary inscription is a Punic inscription dated to the 1st century BCE or 1st century CE found in 1908 in the Sanctuary of Thinissut near Bir Bouregba, Tunisia. It is currently in the Nabeul Museum, and is known as KAI 137 and RES 942 and 1858. The inscription notes that the sanctuaries were dedicated to Baal Hammon and Tanit.

The sanctuaries were discovered by Captain Jean Cassaigne of the Battalions of Light Infantry of Africa, and the inscription was first published in full by Alfred Merlin.
