= El Amrouni mausoleum =

Ancient site in Tunisia

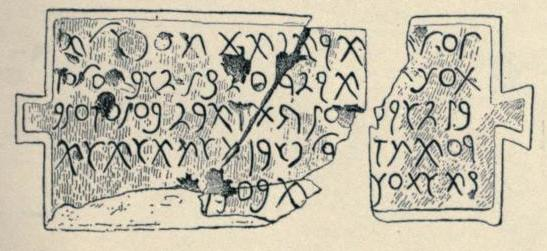
Neo-punic inscription on the mausoleum

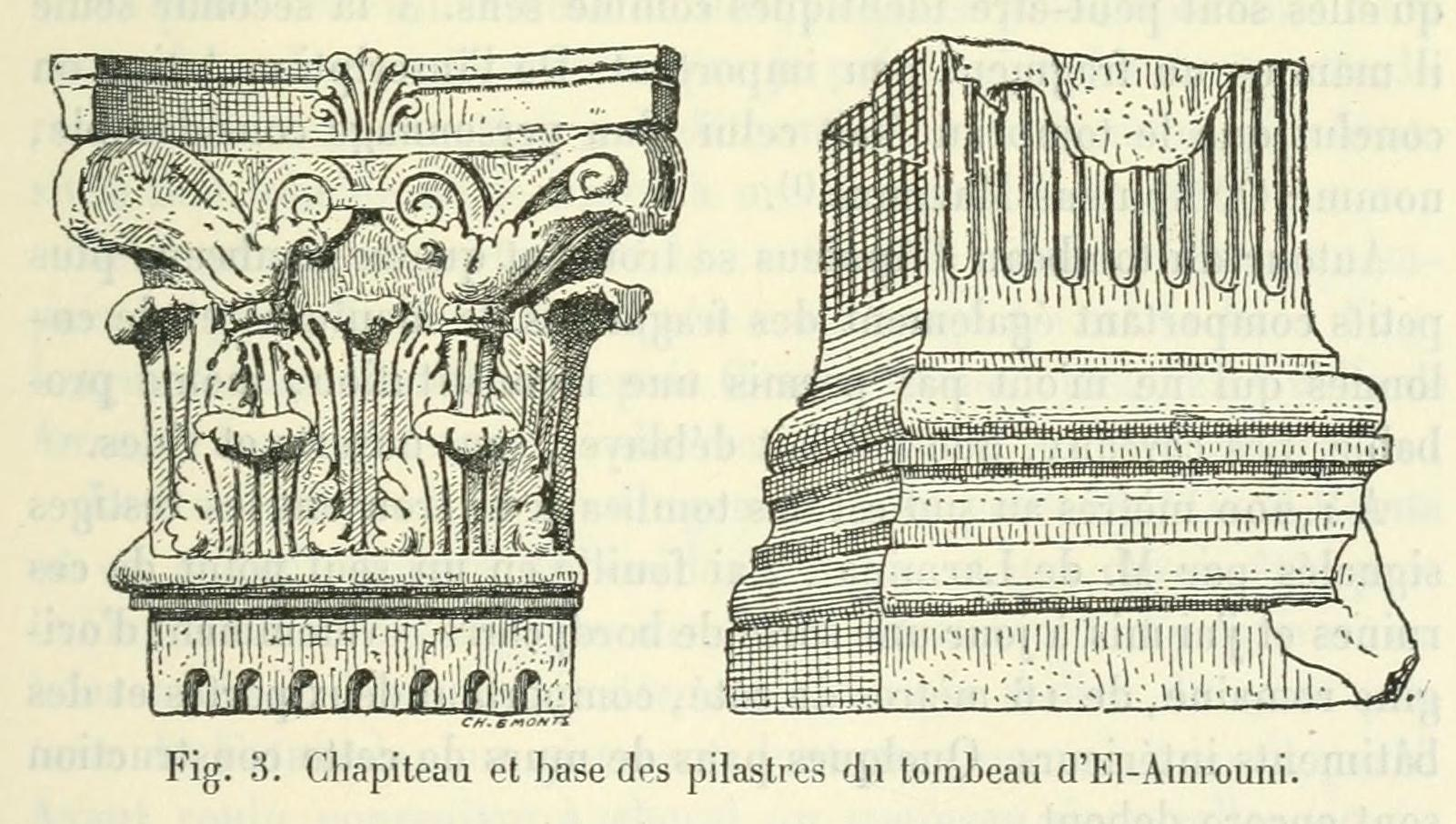
Capitals from the debris of the El Amrouni mausoleum

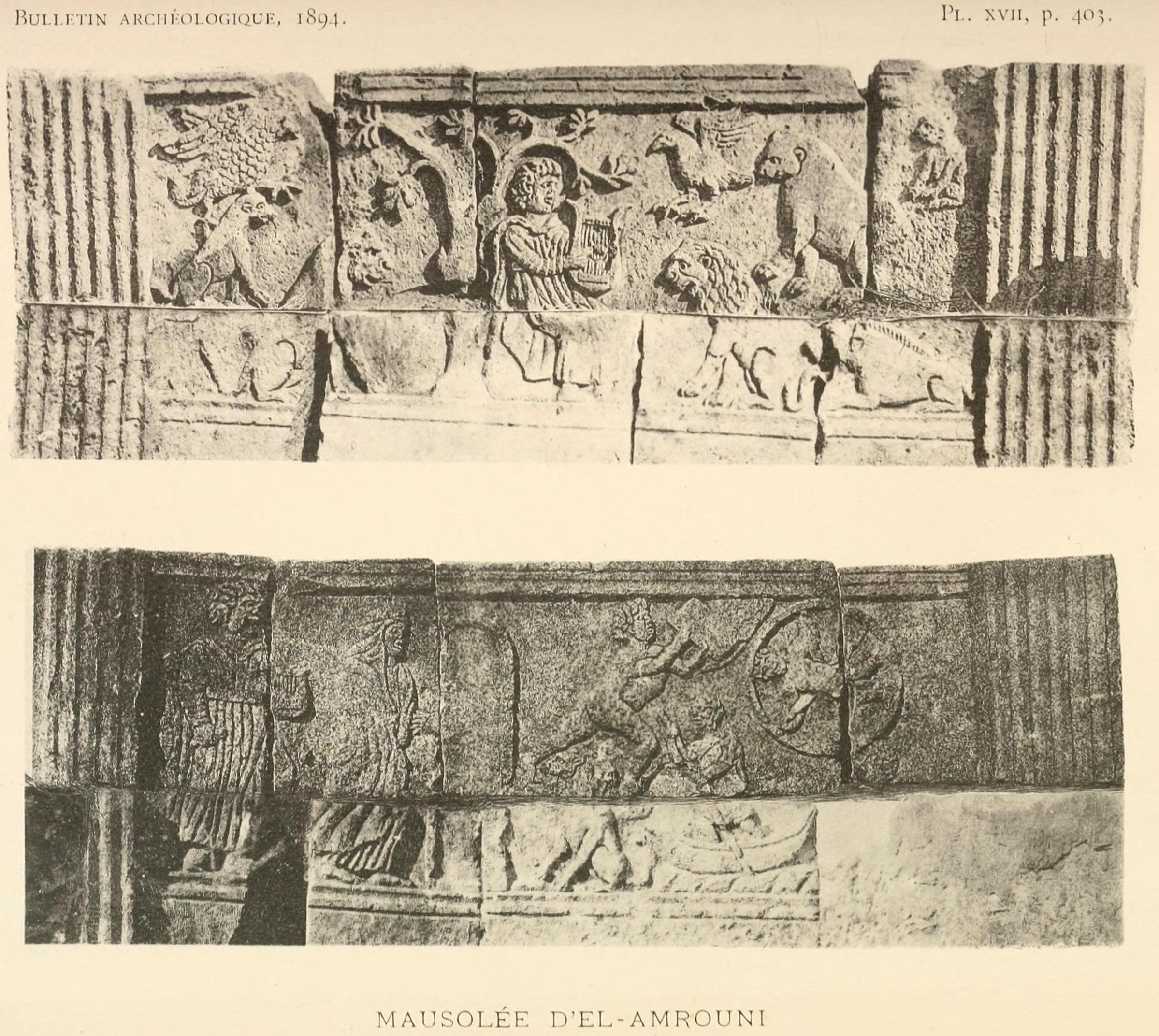
Bas reliefs of the El Amrouni mausoleum

The El Amrouni mausoleum is a Punic tower mausoleum in Tunisia, south of Tataouine, in the Gefara region. It contains a Neo-punic inscription known as KAI 117.

Kanaanäische und Aramäische Inschriften proposes a date of the first century CE, but Latin epigraphy specials have been in favour of a later date.

== Discovery and description ==
They were first discovered in early February 1894 by French Lieutenant Henri-Marie-Albert Lecoy de La Marche, who was on an archaeological reconnaissance mission on behalf of Fernand Foureau.

Lecoy de la Marche had noticed white cut stones emerging from the sand, and recognized moldings on closer inspection. His subsequent excavations uncovered a very large tomb of which only the square base was intact. Fragments of seven of the monument's eight bas-reliefs were found nearby, some under 1 or 2 meters of sand. The reliefs were carved on cut stones measuring almost 0.25cm3. Under the monument a large vault was found, although it was empty and without a covering slab.

The bas reliefs include scenes from the legend of Orpheus descending to Hades in search of Eurydike. Clermont Ganneau noted that the tomb bears similarities with monuments near Leptis Magna, which consist of high square towers adorned with columns, pilasters and sculptures. These were also found badly damaged, likely by earthquakes, and fragments of statues and basreliefs and inscriptions were also found. Four smaller tombs, also containing fragments of moldings and columns, were found nearby.

== Inscriptions ==
Among the nearby finds were two inscriptions, one Latin and the other neo-Punic, found at a very short distance from each other. The Latin inscription notes that the tomb was that of a significant person named Q. Apuleus Maximus.

== Bibliography ==
- Lecoy de La Marche, Henri-Marie-Albert (1894). "Recherche d'une voie romaine du golfe de Gabès vers Ghadamès, par M. le lieutenant Lecoy de La Marche". Bulletin archéologique du Comité des travaux historiques et scientifiques (in French). 12. Bibliothèque nationale.
- Clermont-Ganneau, Charles Simon (1895). "L'inscription d'El Amrouni et les dieux Mânes des Sémites". Études d'archeologie orientale. Bibliothèque de l'Ecole des hautes études: Sciences historiques et philologiques (in French). Vol. I. F. Vieweg. pp. 156–164.
- Vattioni, F. (1980). "La bilingue latina e neopunica di El-Amrouni". Helikon: Rivista di tradizione e cultura classica (in Italian). 20–21. Edizioni Rondinella, Università di Messina: 293–99.
