= Bourgade inscriptions =

Punic inscriptions in Tunisia

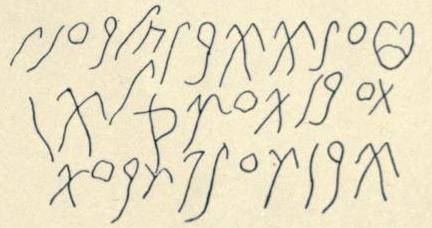
- KAI 133
- Writing: Punic
- Discovered: 1852

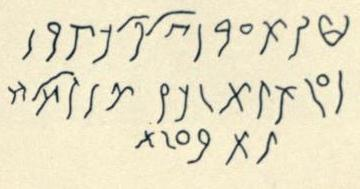
KAI 134

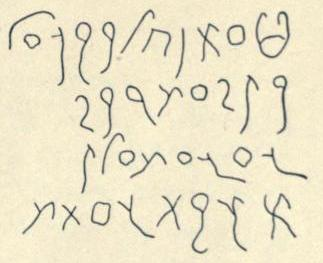
KAI 135

The Bourgade inscriptions are approximately 40 neo-Punic inscriptions, found in the 1840s and early 1850s in Husainid Tunisia, which had just been opened up to French influence following the 1846 meeting between Ahmad I ibn Mustafa and Antoine, Duke of Montpensier.

- 17 ex-voto religious offerings: 13 texts and 4 bas-reliefs;
- 34 funerary epitaphs: 28 texts and 6 bas-reliefs.

Bourgade also republished two notable steles named "Carthaginian A" and "Carthaginian B", which were discovered in 1845 on the port-island of Carthage.

Some of the inscriptions were found near the ruins of Carthage or the surrounding area, and the rest at various points of the Regency of Tunis. Several were discovered by an archaeologist named Filippo Basiola Honegger; subsequent studies confirmed that the location of many of the finds was Maghrāwa, just north of Maktar.

Most of the stones were the property of the Tunisian public, both in the countryside and the cities.

A number of the most notable inscriptions have been collected in Kanaanäische und Aramäische Inschriften, and are known as are known as KAI 133-135.

They were published in 1852 by François Bourgade in his Toison d'Or de la Langue Phénicienne.

== The Inscriptions ==
KAI 133 = NE 436,3:

(1) ṭʻnʼ ʼbn z lbʻlš(2)mʻ bn mʻsqlʼ-(3)ʼ bn šʻnt šbʻm

Erected (was) this stone for Baʻalsamoʻ the son of MʻSQLʼʼ, a “son” of seventy years.

KAI 134 = NE 436,4:

(1) ṭnʼ ʻbn z lplks bn (2) pʻwstʼ wkn šnt šlš(3)tm bʻym

Erected (was) this stone for Felix the son of PʻWSTʼ. And he was three years. He was good in (his) day (during his lifetime).

KAI 135 = NE 436,7:

(1) ṭʻ(nʼ) ʼ(b)n z lbrk(b)ʻl (2) bt yʻšdby (3) wʻwʻ šʻnt (4) ʼsrm wʻmš

Erected (was) this stone for Biricbal daughter of YʻŠDBY. And she lived twenty-five years.

NSI 54 = NE 436,8

== Bibliography ==
- Chabot Jean-Baptiste. Les inscriptions puniques de la collection Marchant. In: Comptes rendus des séances de l'Académie des Inscriptions et Belles-Lettres, 60^{e} année, N. 1, 1916. pp. 17–34. DOI : https://doi.org/10.3406/crai.1916.73653
