= KNMY inscription =

Punic votive inscription

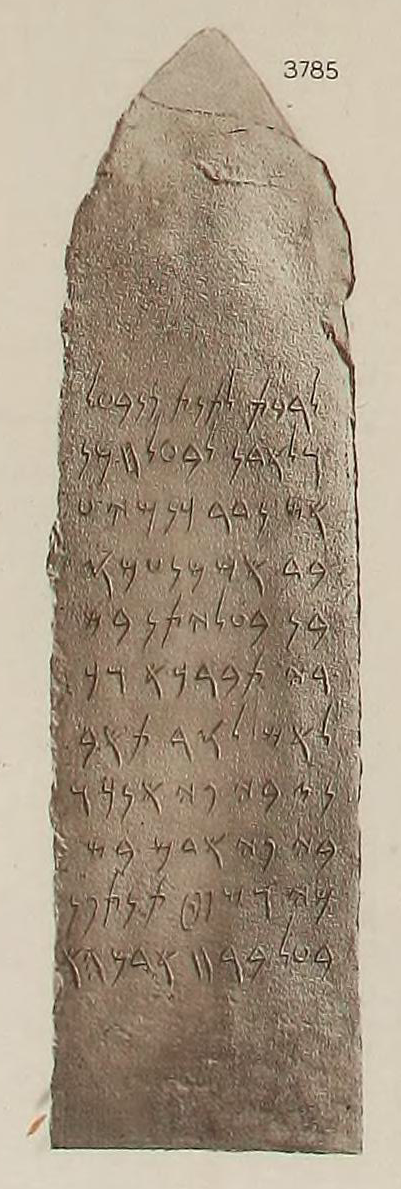
KAI 79

The KNMY inscription (KAI 79 or CIS I 3785) is an inscription in the Punic language from Carthage that is believed to record a so-called "molk" child sacrifice. The text is inscribed on a 55 cm high stela that was discovered in 1922.

In this inscription KNMY, a Carthaginian slave (or "servant"), says that he "vowed" (nador) "his flesh" (BŠRY, cf. Hebrew b^{e}śarō) to the two major gods of Carthage, Tinnīt-Phanebal and Ba‘al-Ḥammon, which is understood to mean that he sacrificed a child of his (Krahmalkov translates BŠRY as "<this child> of his own flesh").

The name rendered in Punic as KNMY is not otherwise known. It is not Semitic, but probably Libyan or Berber. The inscription ends with a curse for those who might remove or damage the stela.

== Text of the inscription ==
The inscription reads:

(line 1)	LRBT LTNT PN B‘L	(Dedicated) to the Lady (to) Tinnīt-Phanebal
(2)	WL’DN LB‘L ḤMN	and to the Lord (to) Ba‘al-Ḥammon,
(3)	’Š NDR KNMY	is (the sacrifice) that KNMY vowed,
(3-5)	‘/BD ’ŠMN‘MS / BN B‘LYTN	—the sl/ave of Esmûnamos / son of Ba‘alyaton—:
(5-6)	BŠ/RY	his fl/esh.
(6)	TBRK’	May you (Tinnīt-Phanebal and Ba‘al-Ḥammon) bless him (KNMY)!
(6-8)	WK/L ’Š LSR T ’B/N Z	And any/one who (= if anyone) shall remove this st/one
(8)	BY PY ’NK	without the permission of myself
(8-10)	W/BY PY ’DM BŠ/MY	and / without the permission of someone in my n/ame,
(10-11)	WŠPṬ TNT PN / B‘L BRḤ ’DM H’	then Tinnīt-Phanebal will condemn / the intent of that person!
