= Kition Tariffs =

Phoenician inscriptions discovered in Cyprus in 1879

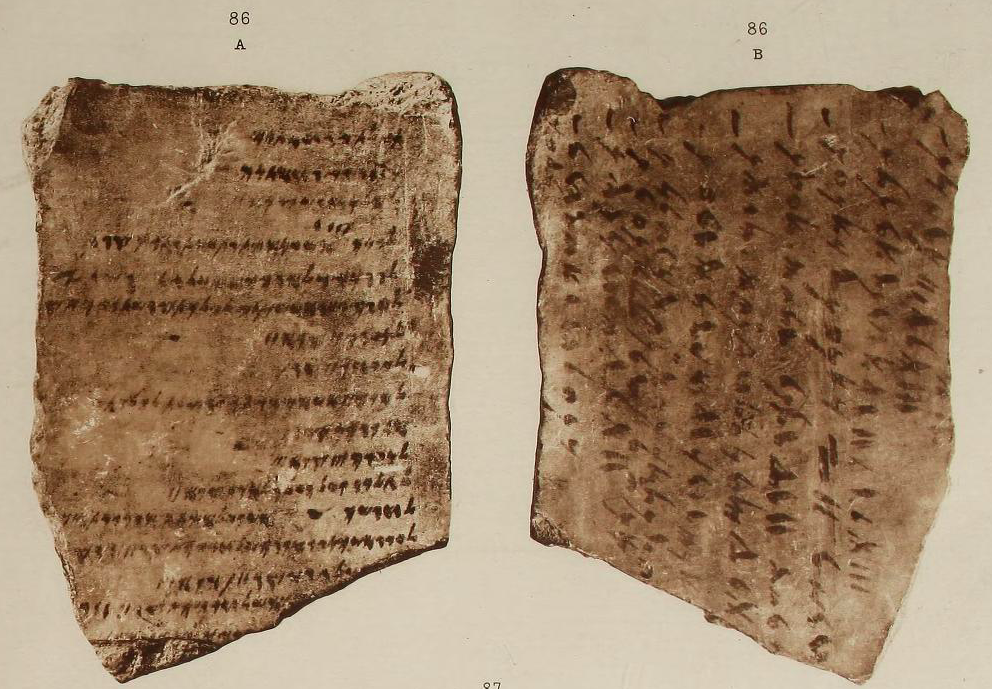
The long inscription (showing both sides) in the Corpus Inscriptionum Semiticarum (CIS I 86)

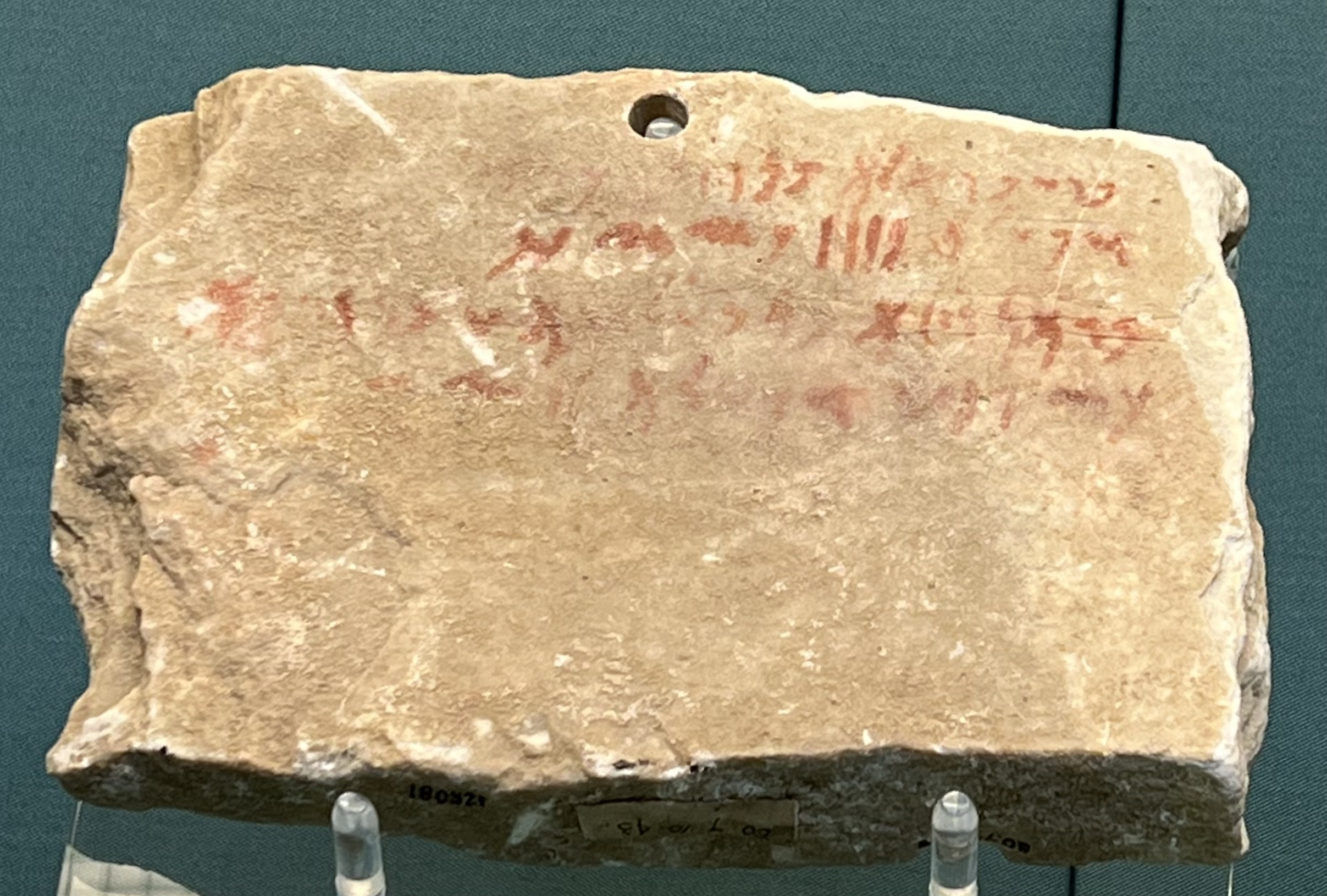
The shorter of the two Kition Tariffs, in the British Museum, CIS I 87

The Kition Tariffs are two important Phoenician inscriptions found in Kition (Larnaka), Cyprus in 1879. The longer of the two has been described as "Among the longest and most important Phoenician inscriptions from Cyprus".

== Discovery ==
They were excavated in 1879 from a mound known as the Bamboula, by a team led by Lieutenant Hugh Montgomery Sinclair (1855 – 1927) of the Royal Engineers. They were presented to the British Museum in 1880, where they remain on display.

Sinclair was assisted in his works by Demetrios Pieridis; Sinclair's 5 July 1879 report described: "2 Phoenician inscriptions have been found written in some sort of paint on stone & being (according to Mr. Pierides) accounts of wages." The finds were brought to the attention of the British Museum in 1880 in a report from Charles Thomas Newton, forwarding a letter from Charles Abbott, 3rd Baron Tenterden on behalf of Granville Leveson-Gower, 2nd Earl Granville. Newton's report stated:

Near Larnaka is a mound of rubbish close to a stagnant pool of salt water which is believed to be the site of the ancient harbour of Kition. This stagnant pool, which contributed to the unhealthiness of Larnaka during the summer months, has been filled up by levelling the mound of rubbish under the direction of Lieut. Sinclair R.E. whose report of these operations is enclosed herewith. Irregular foundation walls of various epochs were discovered in the mound which are shown in the tracing annexed to Lieut. Sinclair's Report... Among the antiquities found here the most interesting are two pieces of calcareous stone on one of which are 17 lines of Phoenician inscription on one side and 12 lines in the same character written in black.

== Text of CIS I 86 ==
The long inscription (CIS I 86 or KAI 37) reads:

A side	(line A.1)	TKLT YRḤ ’TNM	EXPENDITURES (of the temple) (in) THE MONTH OF ETHANIM (September-October)
	(A.2)	BḤDŠ YRḤ ’TNM	On the new moon of the month of Ethanim:
	(A.3-4)	L’LN ḤDŠ QP’ 𐤚 / 𐤛 𐤖	For the god Ḥodis [New Moon]: 2 (or 6?) «QP’».
	(A.5)	LBNM ’Š BN ’YT BT ‘ŠTRT KT QP’ 𐤖[...?]	For the builders who built the temple of Astarte at Kition: 1(?) «QP’».
	(A.6)	LPRKM WL’DMM ’Š ‘L DL QṢR 𐤘	For the taskmasters and for the men who are in charge of the labor force: 20 «QṢR».
	(A.7)	LŠRM B‘R ’Š ŠKNM LMLKT QDŠT BYM Z Q[P’? ...]	For those living in the city who were employed in the sacred liturgy on this day: ... «Q[P’?]».
	(A.8)	LN‘RM 𐤚 QP’ 𐤚	For the 2 young servitors (in the temple): 2 «QP’».
	(A.9)	LZBḤM 𐤚 QR 𐤖	For the 2 sacrificial priests: 1 «QR».
	(A.10-11)	L’PM 𐤚 ’Š ’P ’YT [ṬN]’ ḤLT LMLKT [QDŠT] / ’T PRMN QR 𐤚(?)	For the 2 bakers who baked the [?baske]t of loaves for the [sacred] liturgy, together with PRNM: 2(?) «QR».
	(A.12)	LN‘RM 𐤛 QP’ 𐤛	For the 3 young servitors: 3 «QP’».
	(A.13)	LGLBM P‘LM ‘L ML’KT QP’ 𐤚	For the barbers who work for the liturgy: 2 «QP’».
	(A.14)	LḤRŠM 𐤘 ’Š P‘L ’ŠTT ’[Š] BBT MK[L ...]	For the 20 craftsmen who made the female statues th[at] are in the temple of MK[L: ...]
	(A.15)	L‘BD’ŠMN RB SPRM ŠLḤ BYM Z QR 𐤛 WQ[P’ ...]	For Abdeshmūn, Head of the Scribes, who was commissioned on this day: 3 «QR» and ... «Q[P’]».
	(A.16)	[LKLBM] WLGRM QR 𐤛 WP’ 𐤛	[For the axmen] and for the sawyers: 3 «QR» and 3 «[Q]P’».
	(A.17)	[L... ...]’ ŠLḤ BYM Z QR 𐤚 WQ[P’ ...]	[For ... who] was commissioned on this day: 2 «QR» and ... «Q[P’]».
	(A.18)	[L... ... ...] . YK . Š[... ]’ 𐤚 (?)	[For ...: ...] 2 (?)
B side	(B.1)	D[L]T ‘QB	COLUMN ON THE VERSO SIDE
	(B.2)	BḤDŠ YRḤ P‘LT	On the new moon of the month of Pa‘loth:
	(B.3)	L’LN ḤDŠ QP’ 𐤚	For the god Ḥodis [New Moon]: 2 «QP’».
	(B.4)	LB‘LM YM BSBB ’LM [... ]	For Ba‘al of the Sea (?) in the precinct (?) of the gods: ...
	(B.5)	LNPŠ BT ’Š L’ŠTT MKL WŠ[...]	For the personnel of the temple of the (female) consorts of MKL and Š[...: ...]
	(B.6)	L‘BD’BST HQRTḤDŠTY	For ‘Abdubast the Carthaginian (Carthage: city in Cyprus?): [...?]
	(B.7)	L’ŠM ’Š LQḤ [MKL]BM QP’[ ...]	For the men who were taken (ransomed) from prisons(?): ... «QP’».
	(B.8)	LR‘M ’Š B[D P]P LKD QR 𐤚 ’Š B[ ...]	For the shepherds who were seized by Paphos(?) (a ransom?): 2 «QR» of which [...].
	(B.9)	L‘LMT WL‘LMT 𐤚𐤘 BZBḤ [...]	For the maidens, that is(?), for the 22 virgins at the sacrifice: [...].
	(B.10)	LKLBM WLGRM QR 𐤛 WP’ 𐤛	For the axmen and for the sawyers: 3 «QR» and 3 «[Q]P’».
	(B.11)	LN‘RM 𐤛 QP’ 𐤛	For the 3 young servitors (in the temple): 3 «QP’».
	(B.12)	[L... QP]’ 𐤚	[For ...: ] 2 «[QP]’».

Line 14 of side A of the longer inscription may notably describe the head of the tablet scribes ("RB SPRM Š LḤ").

== Text of CIS I 87 ==
The short inscription (CIS I 87 or Kition 84) reads:

(line 1)	BD ‘BD’LM BN Ḥ[... ]	In the charge of ‘Abdilim, son of Ḥ[...], (are) [...]
(2)	WP‘LM 𐤛𐤖𐤗𐤘𐤘𐤙	and 145 workmen.
(3)	BD MNḤM BN B‘L[Š]M‘ B[N ..]M [...]	In the charge of Meneḥḥem, son of Ba‘alsamo‘ s[on of ...]M, (are) [...]
(4)	WP‘LM 𐤚𐤘	and 22 workmen.
