= Wilmanns Neopunic inscriptions =

Neopunic inscriptions

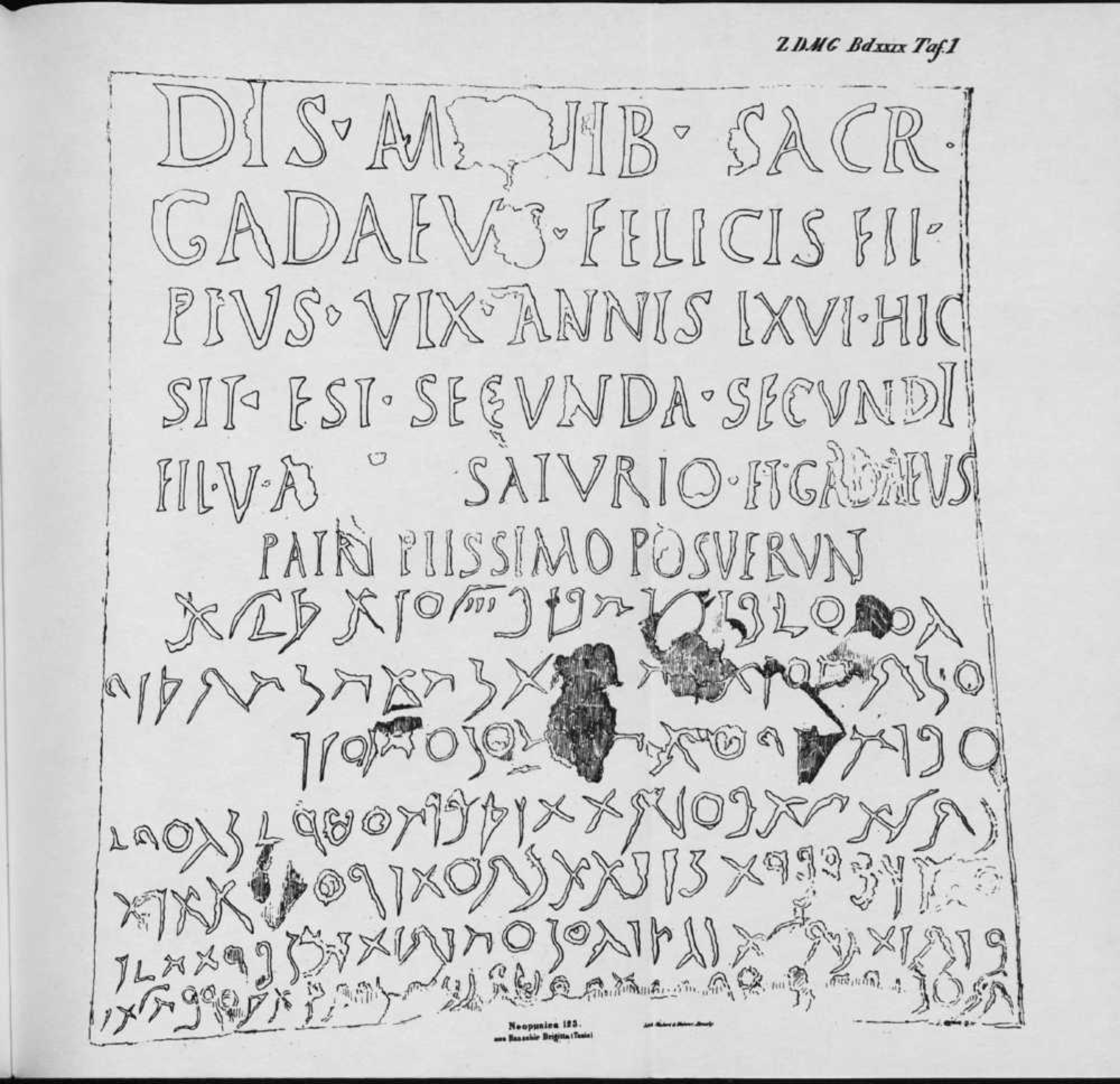
Henchir Brigitta inscription, KAI 142, Neo-Punic 123

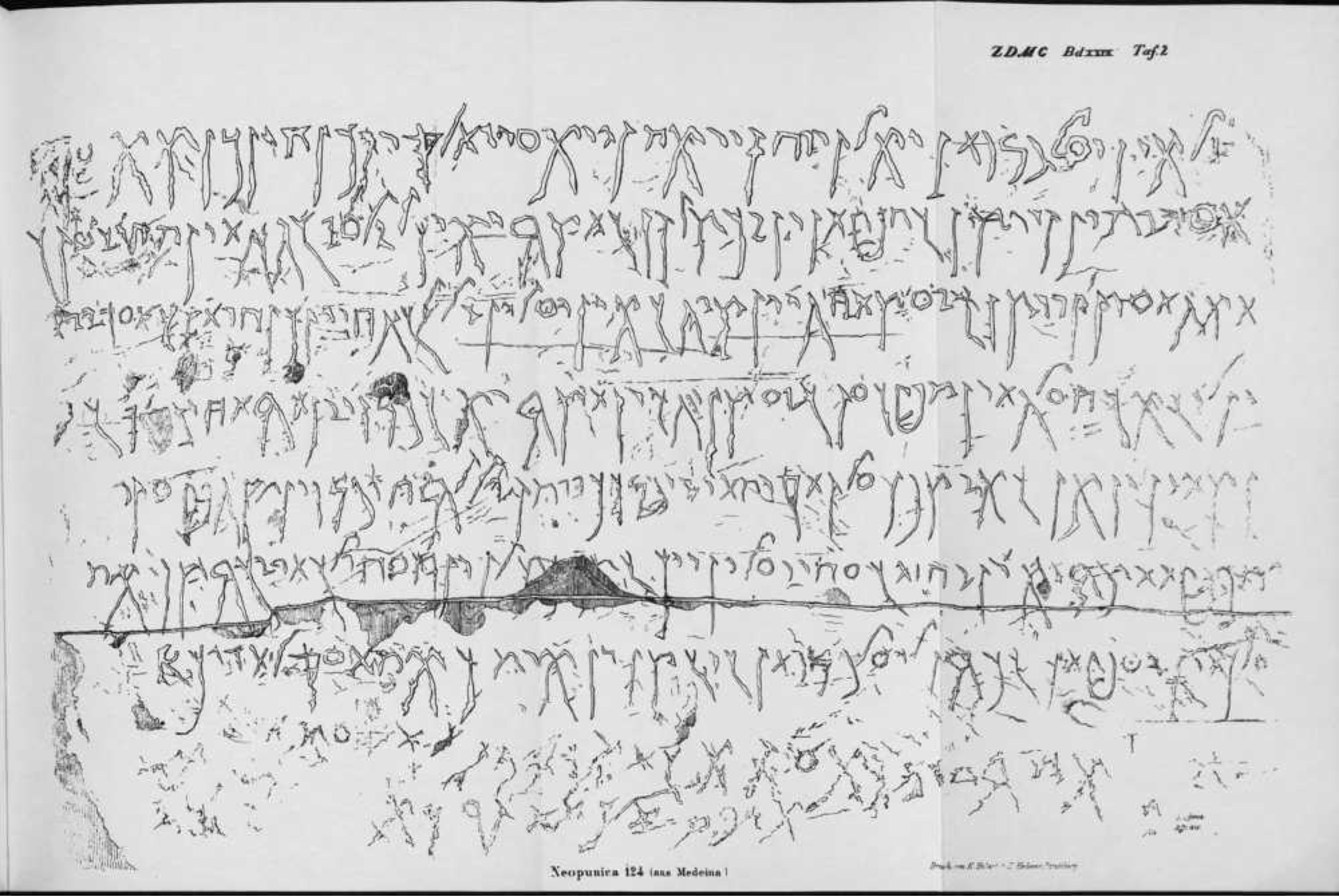
Altiburus (Henchir Medeina) inscription, KAI 159, Neo-Punic 124

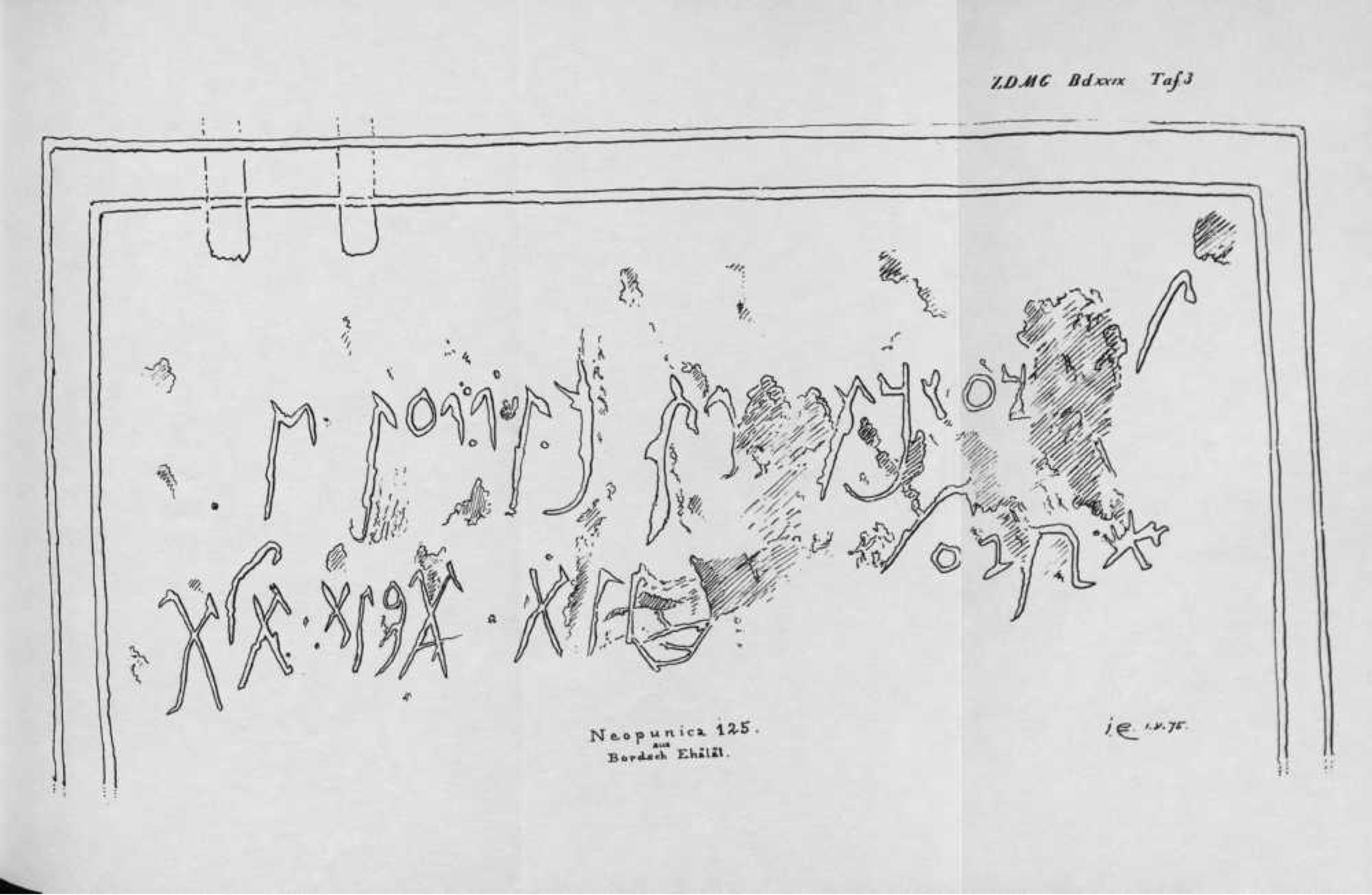
Bordj Helal inscription, KAI 139, Neo-Punic 125

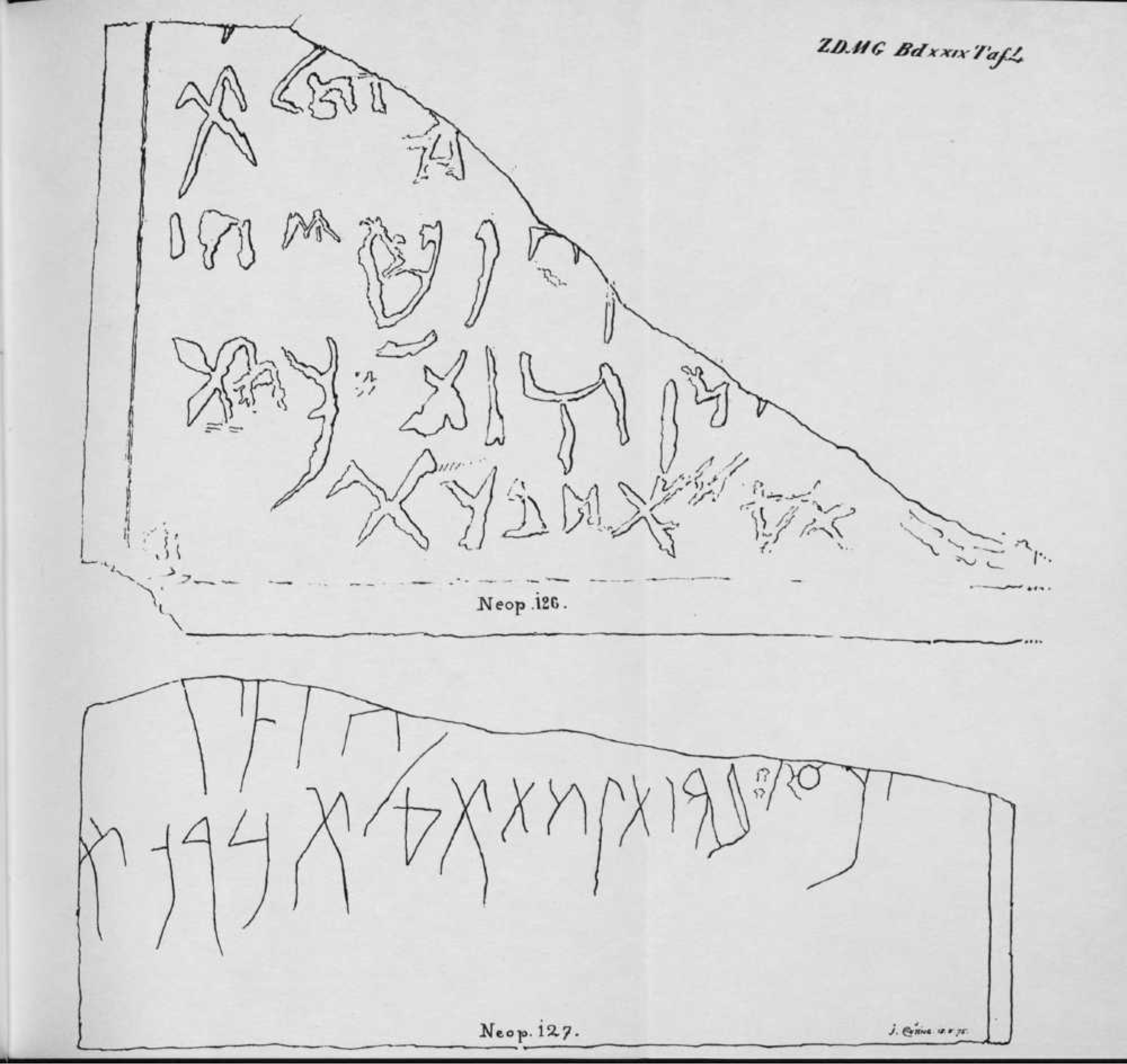
Neo-Punic 126 and 127

The Wilmanns Neopunic inscriptions are five Neopunic inscriptions discovered in 1873–74 in Ottoman Tunisia by Gustav Heinrich Wilmanns and published in 1876 by Julius Euting.

The first three are known as KAI 139, 142 and 159. The numbering used by Euting (123-127) followed from his 1871 publication Punischen Steinen.

== The inscriptions ==
The Henchir Brigitta inscription, a bilingual Latin-Neopunic inscription, also known as KAI 142, NSI 53 and NE 435,2, is in the Vorderasiatisches Museum Berlin.

The Altiburus (Henchir Medeina) inscription, KAI 159, NSI 55 and NE 437a, is in the Louvre (AO 5106).

The Bordj Helal inscription, KAI 139, is also in the Louvre (AO 5144). It is bilingual with Berber inscription.

== Bibliography ==
- Bron F., Notes sur les inscriptions néo-puniques de Henchir Medeina (Althiburos), Journal of Semitic Studies 54, 2009, 141-147
- Xella P., Tahar M., Les inscriptions puniques et néopuniques d'Althiburos. Présentation préliminaire, RSF 42, 2014, 123-126
- Sznycer, Maurice, « Le texte néopunique de la bilingue de Bordj Hellal », Semitica, 27, 1977, p. 47-57, p. 47-57, pl. VII et IX
