= Daskyleion steles =

Aramean steles

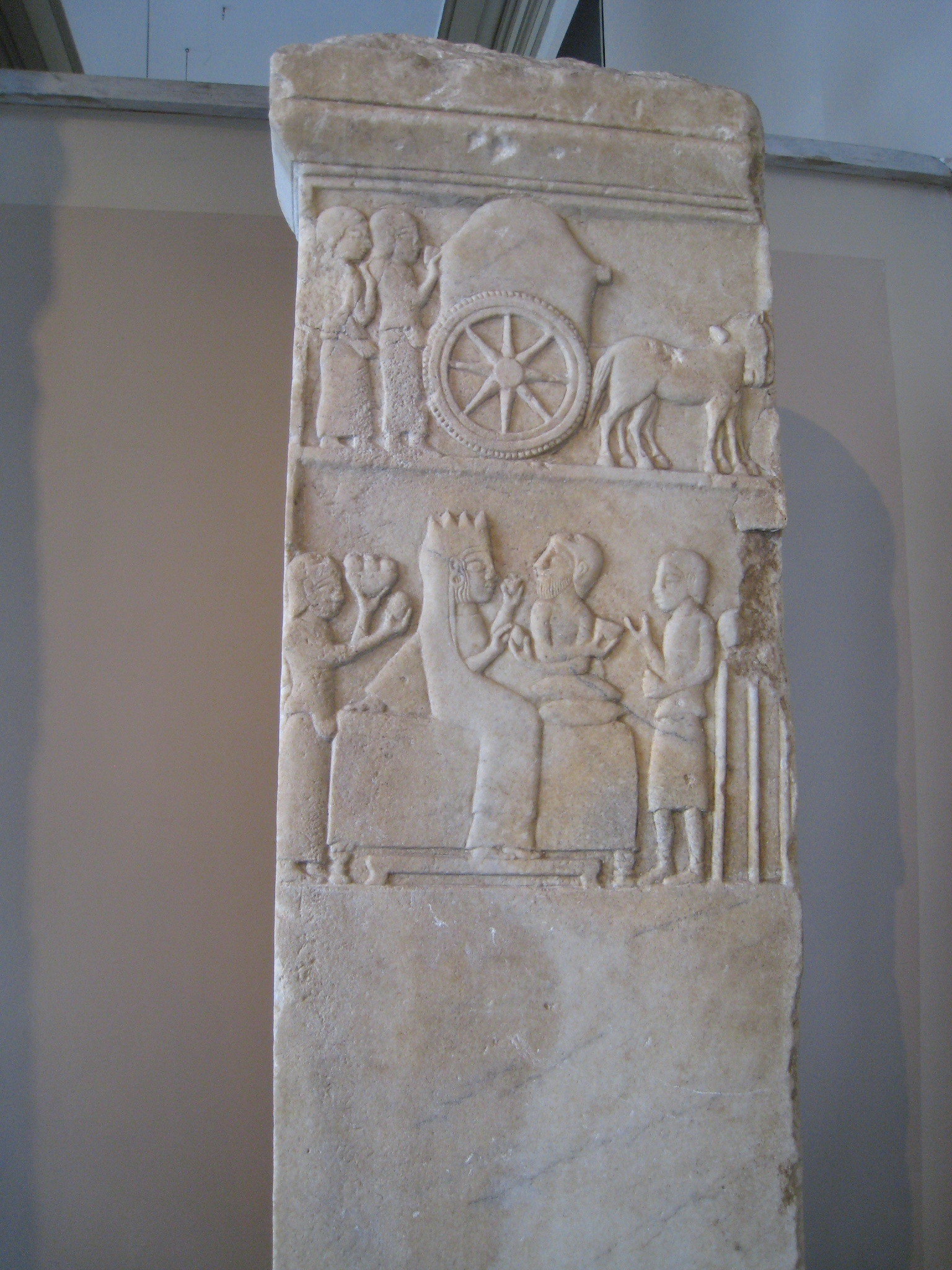
One of the three Daskyleion steles, in the Museum of the Ancient Orient in Istanbul.

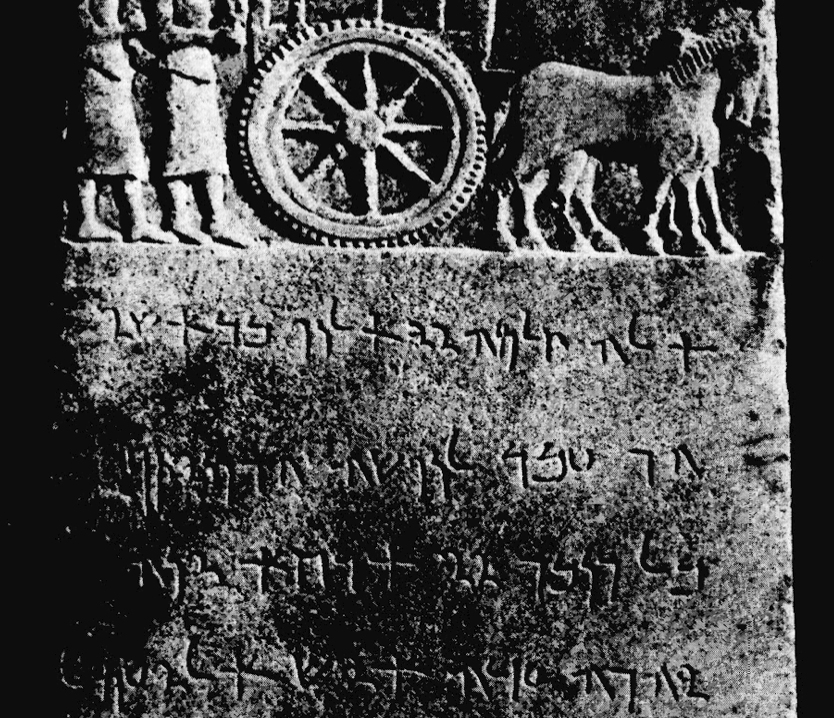
The Aramaic inscription

The Daskyleion steles are three marble steles discovered in 1958 in Dascylium, in northwest Turkey.

The Aramaic inscription is known as KAI 318. It is dated to the fifth century BCE.

== Text of the inscription ==
The inscription seems to be sepulchral. The text reads:

(line 1)	’LH ṢLMH ZY ’LNP BR ’ŠY	These are the images (the relief) of Elnap, son of ’ŠY.
(2)	HW ‘BD LNPŠH HWMYTK	He has made (it) for his funerary monument. I adjure thee
(3)	BL WNBW ZY ’RḤ’ ZNH	by Bel and Nabu, whoever passes by this way,
(4)	YHWH ‘DH ’YŠ ’L Y‘ML	let no-one do harm [to my tomb]!

The inscription had originally been interpreted as a kind of "insurance project" set up by Elnap, presumably a merchant, for the safe passage of his caravans:

These are the images of Elnap, son of ’ŠY (Isai).
He has made (it) for himself as (a man) devoted(?) to
Bel and Nabu, so that his caravan (lit.: road) may travel safely.
May no-one suffer from harm!

The revised interpretation as a sepulchral monument is based on the iconography, the place where the stelae were found, and a more natural reading of the Aramaic (the problematic word HWMYTK in line 2 had originally been taken to be an Iranian loanword).

== Bibliography ==
- Dupont-Sommer André. Une inscription araméenne inédite d'époque perse trouvée à Daskyléion (Turquie). In: Comptes rendus des séances de l'Académie des Inscriptions et Belles-Lettres, 110^{e} année, N. 1, 1966. pp. 44–58. DOI : https://doi.org/10.3406/crai.1966.11934
- Cross, F. (1966). An Aramaic Inscription from Daskyleion. Bulletin of the American Schools of Oriental Research, (184), 7–10. doi:10.2307/1356198
- George M. A. Hanfmann. (1966). https://www.jstor.org/stable/1356199 The New Stelae from Daskylion]. Bulletin of the American Schools of Oriental Research, (184), 10–13. doi:10.2307/1356199
- Akurgal, E., "Les fouilles de Daskyleion." Anatolia 1 (1956): 20–24 + pl. XII
- Akurgal, E., "Griechisch-persische Reliefs aus Daskyleion." Iranica antiqua 6 (1966): 147–56 + 6 pl..
- Hanfmann, G.M. A., "The New Stelae from Daskylion." BASOR 184 (1966): 10–13.
- Delcor, M., "Une inscription funéraire araméenne trouvée à Daskyleion en Turquie." Muséon 80 (1967): 301–14 + 2 pls.
- Dolunay, N., "Reliefs Discovered at Dascyleion (Ergili)." Annual of the Archaeological Museums of Istanbul 13-14 (1967): 97–111 + 7 pls.
