= Ain Nechma inscriptions =

Punic inscriptions from ancient Calama

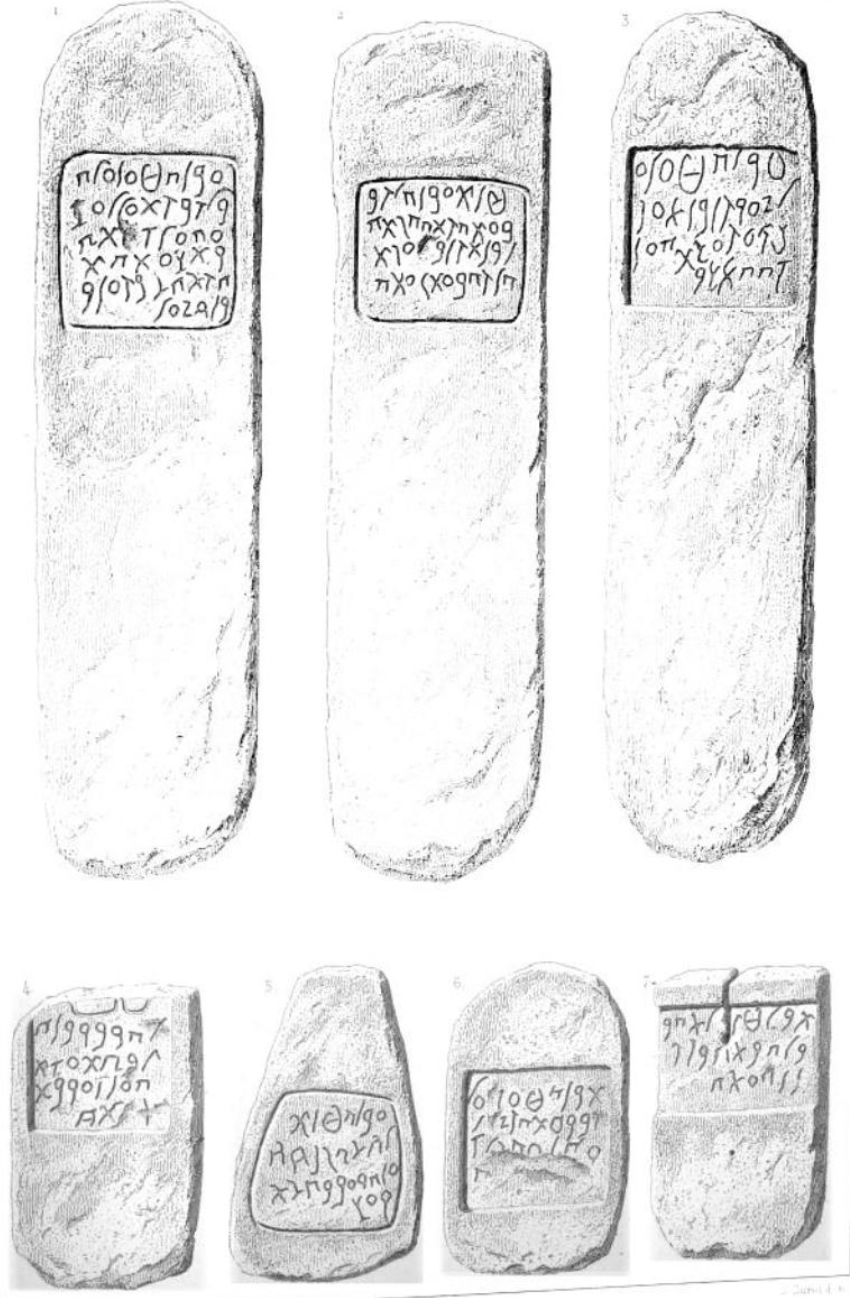
- Delamare's sketch (plate 187) of the Guelma Punic inscriptions
- Writing: Punic
- Discovered: 1837

The Ain Nechma inscriptions, also known as the Guelma inscriptions are a number of Punic language inscriptions, first found in 1837 in the necropolis of Ain Nechma, in the Guelma Province of Algeria (ancient Calama).

By the early 20th century, about 40 such inscriptions had been discovered - they had become well known in Semitic epigraphy due to their unique use of certain turns of phrase and unique form given to some letters of the Punic-Phoenician alphabet.

A number of the most notable inscriptions have been collected in Kanaanäische und Aramäische Inschriften, and are known as are known as KAI 166–169.

The inscriptions are in the Louvre, the Musée archéologique de Narbonne, and other locations.

== Initial discovery ==
The first two inscriptions were discovered in 1837 by Jean Guyon. Between 1843-45, Adolphe Hedwige Alphonse Delamare collected a greater number and published them in 1850. Most of the steles were sent to the Louvre, and others to the public garden of the city of Guelma, to private individuals, and to the museum of Constantine, Algeria.

The Guelma inscriptions were initially the subject of studies by scholars such as Auguste Celestin Judas, Heinrich Ewald and Moritz Abraham Levy.

== Inscriptions ==
Two types of inscriptions are known: votive inscriptions and funerary inscriptions. The funerary inscriptions, with a few exceptions, show the usual formulaic of neopunic epitaphs. The votive inscriptions, however, contain a unique formula specific to the Ain Nechma inscriptions.

The Delamare inscriptions in the Louvre are known as:

- AO 5107 (Delamare 4 [187])
- AO 5108 (Delamare 5 [187]), on display in room 313 of the Louvre
- AO 5109 (Delamare 2 [187], Lidzbarski 7)
- AO 5110 (Delamare 1 [187], Lidzbarski 6)
- AO 5111 (Delamare 7 [187])
- AO 5112 (Delamare 6 [185], Lidzbarski 5)
- AO 5113 (Delamare 3 [187])
- AO 5114 (Delamare 6 [187])
- AO 5290 (Delamare 18 [178]) on display in room 313 of the Louvre
- AO 5291 (Delamare 9 [178])
- AO 5292 (Delamare 21 [178])
- AO 5293 (Delamare 10 [178])

Others:

- Delamare 9 [185], Lidzbarski 2
- Delamare 7 [185], Lidzbarski 3

== Gallery ==
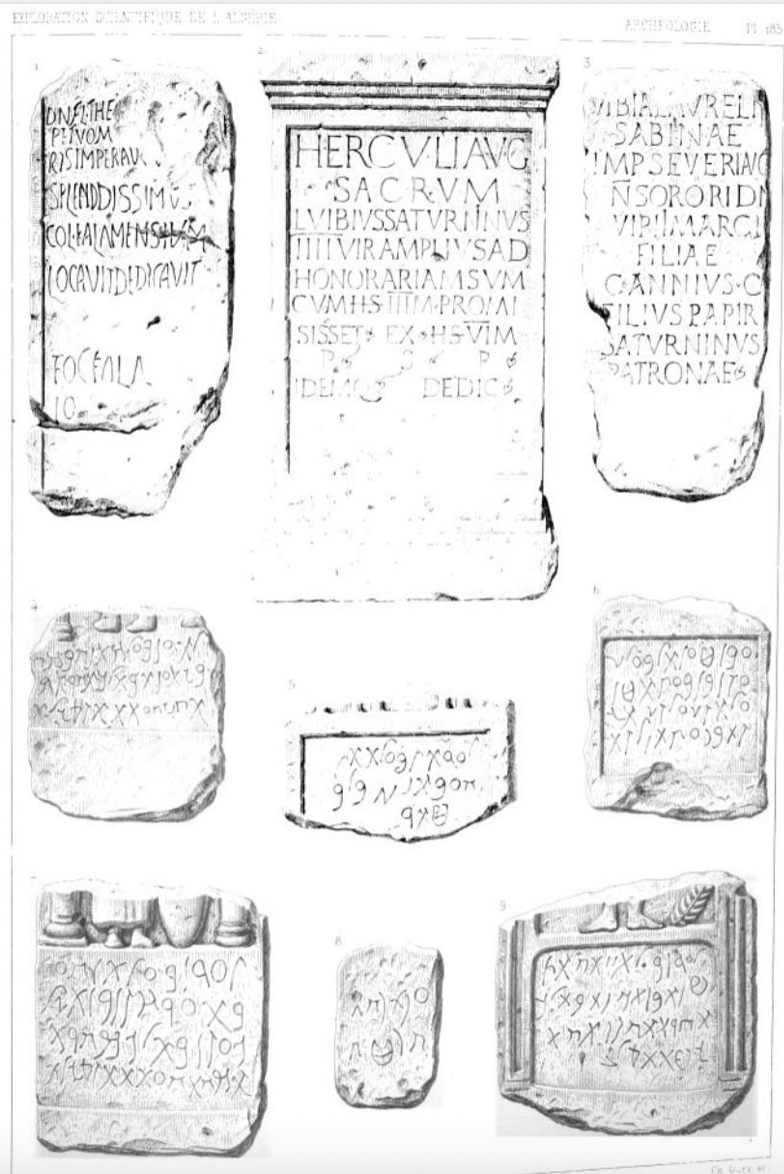
Delamare's sketch (plate 185), including the Guelma Punic inscriptions

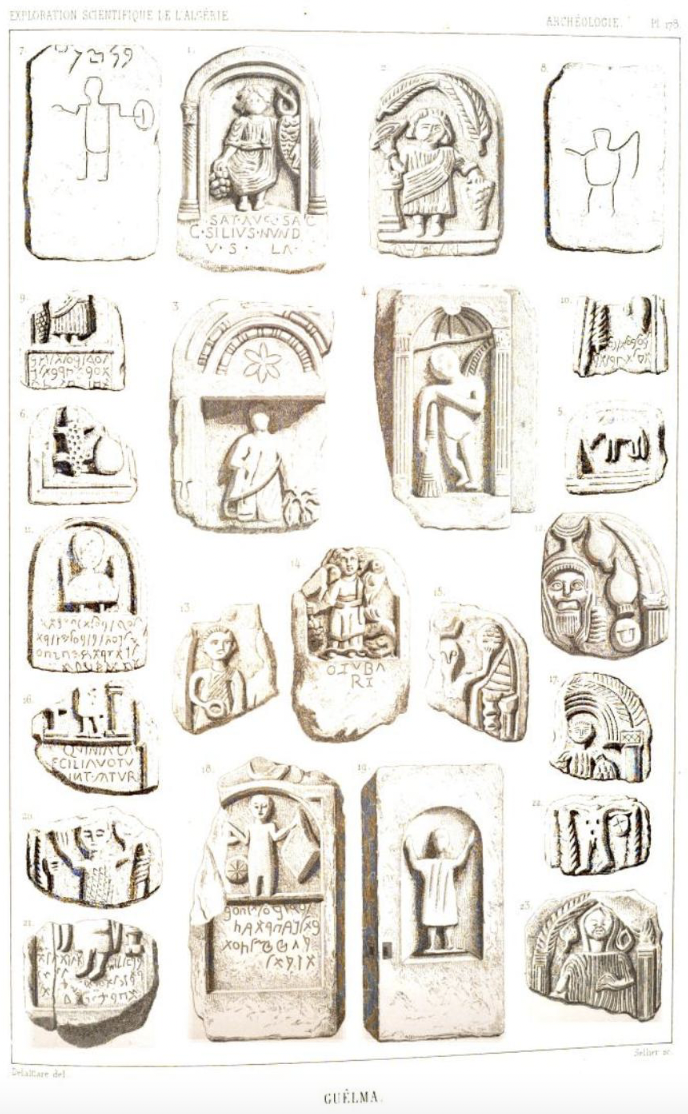
Delamare's sketch (plate 178), including the Guelma Punic inscriptions

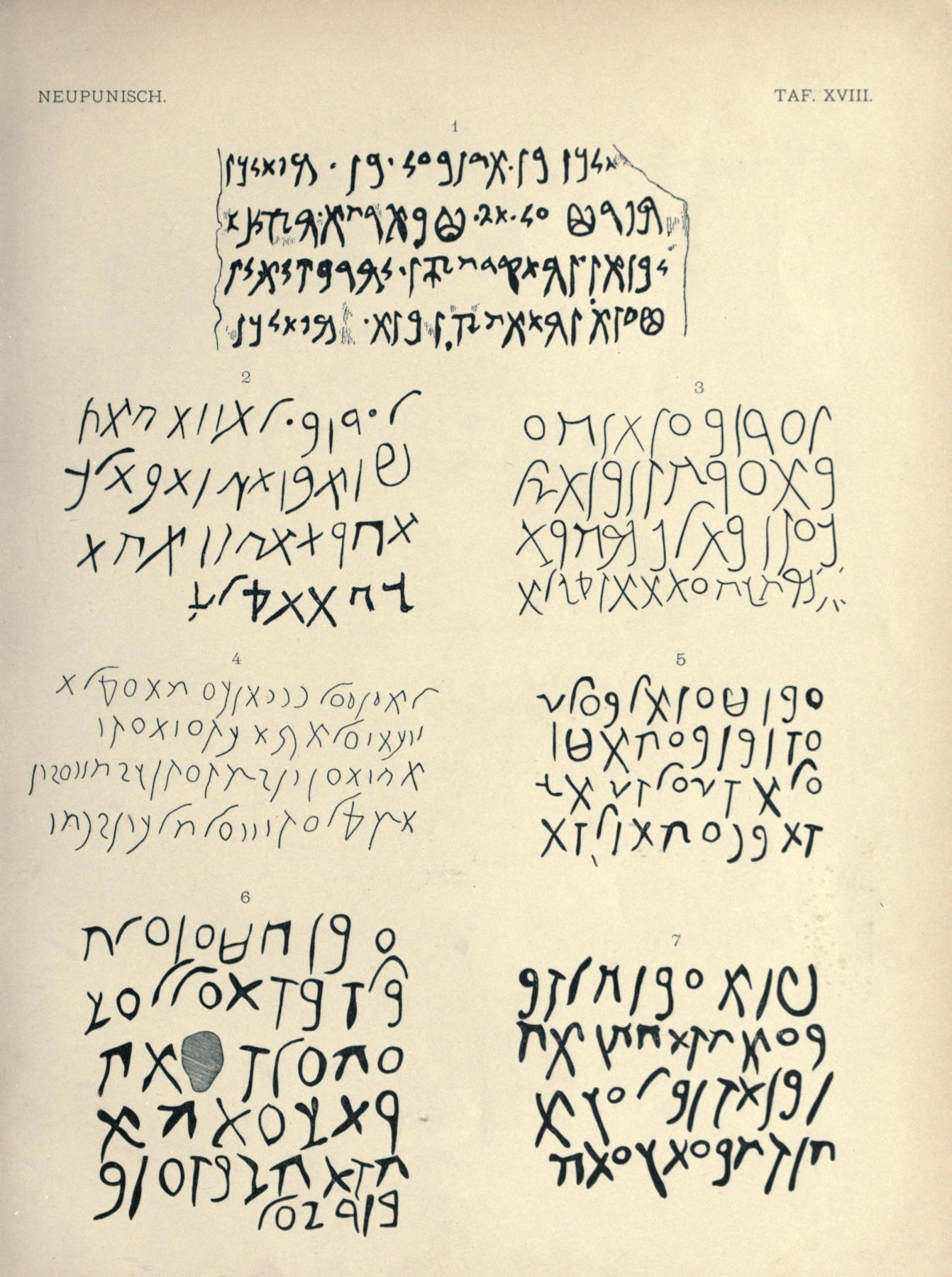
A selection of the inscriptions in Lidzbarski's Handbuch der Nordsemitischen Epigraphik

== Bibliography ==
- Jean-Baptiste Chabot, Punica XI: Les inscriptions néopuniques de Guelma, 1916
- Chabot, J.B. (1918). Punica. Imprimerie nationale. pp. XI: 57-.
- Judas, Auguste Celestin (1847). Étude démonstrative de la langue phénicienne et de la langue libyque. Étude démonstrative de la langue phénicienne et de la langue libyque (in French). J. Klincksieck.
- Judas, Auguste Celestin (1845). "MÉMOIRE Sur plusieurs inscriptions phéniciennes, et particulièrement sur celles qui ont été trouvées en Numidie". Journal Asiatique (in French). Société asiatique.
