= Abda sherd =

Sherd with Phoenician inscription

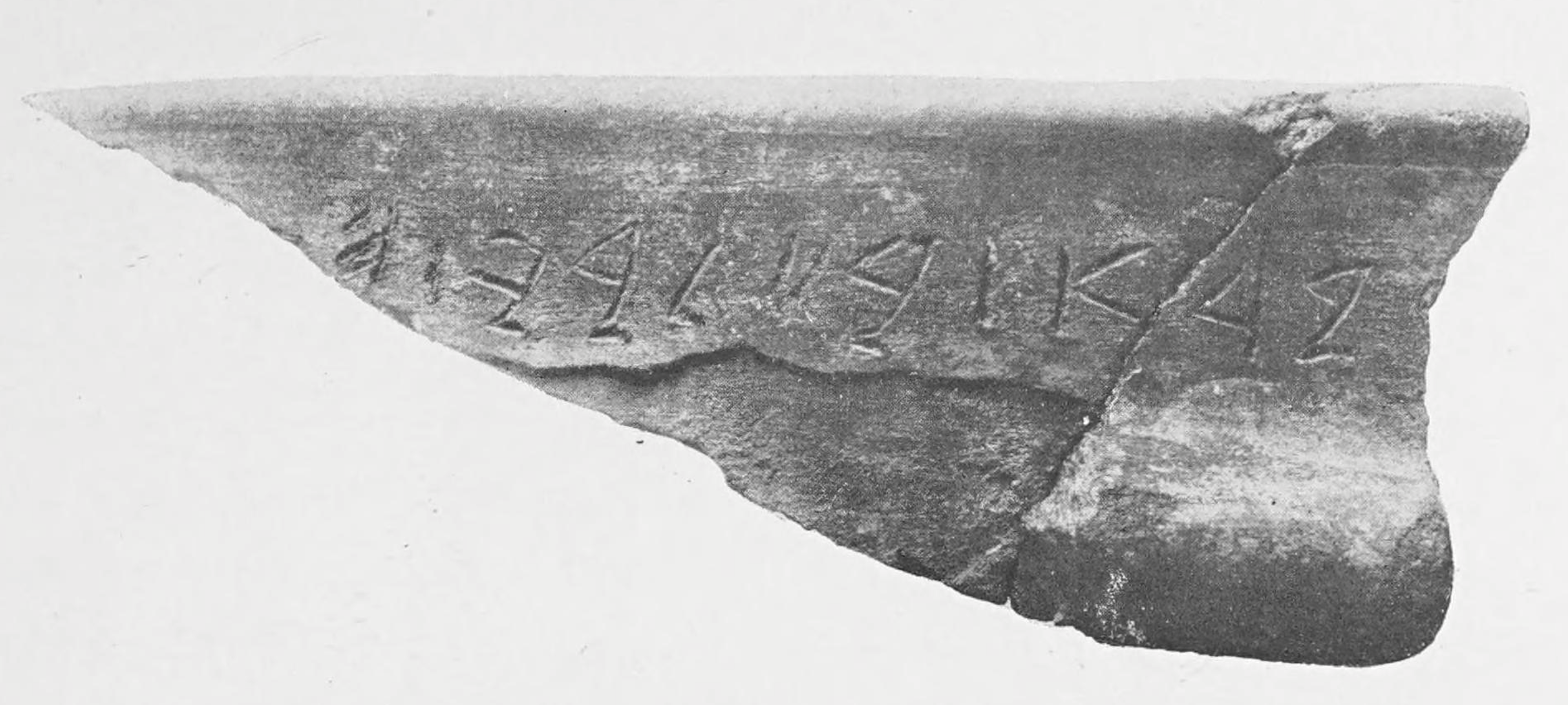
- Abda sherd graffito
- Material: Clay
- Created: c. 900 BC
- Discovered: before 1933; Byblos, Keserwan-Jbeil, Lebanon
- Discovered by: Maurice Dunand

The Abda sherd graffito is a Phoenician inscription (KAI 8 and TSSI III 10) on a two small connecting fragment of a large vase, dating to c. 900 BC.

It was published in Maurice Dunand's Fouilles de Byblos (volume II, 1926–1932, numbers 9008, plate CXLIV). It was described by Dunand as the second milestone in the history of the alphabet between the Middle Kingdom of Egypt and the reign of the King of Byblos Ahiram.

== Text of the inscription ==
The inscription, apparently a property mark on a vase, reads:

[L]‘BD’ BKLBY HY[ṢR]

[Belonging to] Abda, son of Kelbē, the po[tter]

== Bibliography ==
- Christopher Rollston, "The Dating of the Early Royal Byblian Phoenician Inscriptions: A Response to Benjamin Sass." MAARAV 15 (2008): 57–93.
- Benjamin Mazar, The Phoenician Inscriptions from Byblos and the Evolution of the Phoenician-Hebrew Alphabet, in The Early Biblical Period: Historical Studies (S. Ahituv and B. A. Levine, eds., Jerusalem: IES, 1986 [original publication: 1946]): 231–247.
- William F. Albright, The Phoenician Inscriptions of the Tenth Century B.C. from Byblus, JAOS 67 (1947): 153–154.
