= Ignazio Guidi =

Italian orientalist (1844–1935)

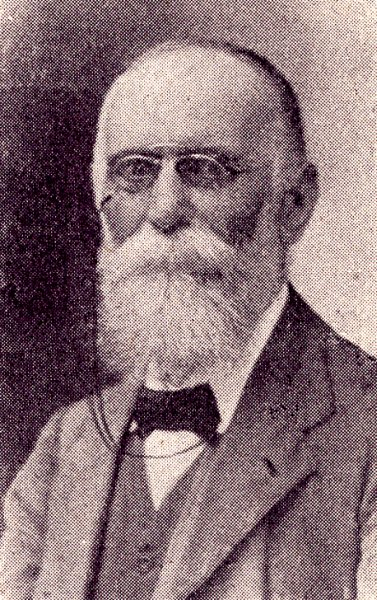
Ignazio Guidi

Ignazio Guidi (1844 – 18 April 1935) was an Italian orientalist and one of the most prominent scholars in the philology of Semitic and Eastern Christian literatures.

He became professor at the University of Rome, teaching from 1876 to 1919. He is known as a Hebraist and for many translations.

He learned semitic languages from Pius Zingerle and Father Vincenti, and taught himself Ge'ez.

He discovered the Khuzistan Chronicle, and edited the Chronicle of Edessa.

He also edited for the first time a letter of Simeon of Beth Arsham about the martyrs of Najran, the oldest evidence for this historical event.

He was the student of the Ethiopian scholar Däbtära Keflä-Giorgis, who played a "crucial role as teacher of the person who could be described as the father of Ethiopian studies in Italy, Ignazio Guidi." He devoted himself to Ethiopian studies from 1885, and his Syriac scholarship is also significant. He met notable Syriac Christian figures such as Syriac Catholic patriarch Ignatius Ephrem Rahmani and Maronite priest Gabriel Cardahi.

== Works ==
Letter by Ignazio Guidi (1913)

- 1881: La lettera di Simeone vescovo di Bêth-Arśâm sopra i Martiri omeriti. Roma, Salviucci.
- 1890: Al-Istidrāk ‘alā Sībawayh by Abū Bakr al-Zubaydī. Rome.
- 1895: Il "Gadla 'Aragâwî" : memoria del socio Ignazio Guidi : letta nella seduta del 21 giugno 1891. Roma : Tip. della R. Accademia dei Lincei.
- 1897: Il Fetha Nagast o "Legislazione dei Ref", Codice ecclesiastico e civile di Abissinia pubblicato da Ignazio Guidi. Roma: Casa editr. italiana.
- 1900: (with: Rudolf-Ernst Brünnow, et al.) Tables alphabétiques du Kitâb al-aġânî ... Leiden, E.J. Brill.
- 1901: (with: Francesco Gallina & Enrico Cerulli) Vocabolario amarico-italiano. Roma: Casa Editrice Italiana.
- 1903: Chronica minora. 2 vols. (Corpus scriptorum Christianorum Orientalium) Lipsiae: Harrassowitz.
- 1903: Annales Iohannis I, Iyāsu I, Bakāffā. Parisiis : E Typographeo Reipublicae.
- 1931: Storia della letteratura etiopica

=== Syriac works ===
His works involving Syriac studies include:

- First "Letter on the Ḥimyarite Martyrs" by Shemʿun of Beth Arsham (1881)
- Jacob of Serug's homily "On the Seven Sleepers of Ephesus" (1884–85)
- Philoxenos of Mabbug’s letter to the monks of Tell ʿAda (1886)
- Statutes of the School of Nisibis (1891; reedited decades later by A. Vööbus)
- Chronicle of Edessa (6th century; edition 1903)
- Chronicle of Khuzistan / Guidi’s Anonymous Chronicle (7th century; editions 1892 and 1903)
- Syriac Acts of the martyr Judas Cyriacus (1904)
- Severus of Antioch’s Cathedral Homilies XCIX–CIII in Jacob of Edessa's translation (PO 22.2, 1930)

== See also ==
- Carl Bezold
- Arthur Vööbus
- William Wright
- Ernest A. Wallis Budge
- Moses of Mardin
