= Handbuch der Nordsemitischen Epigraphik =

1898 handbook of Northwest Semitic inscriptions by Mark Lidzbarski

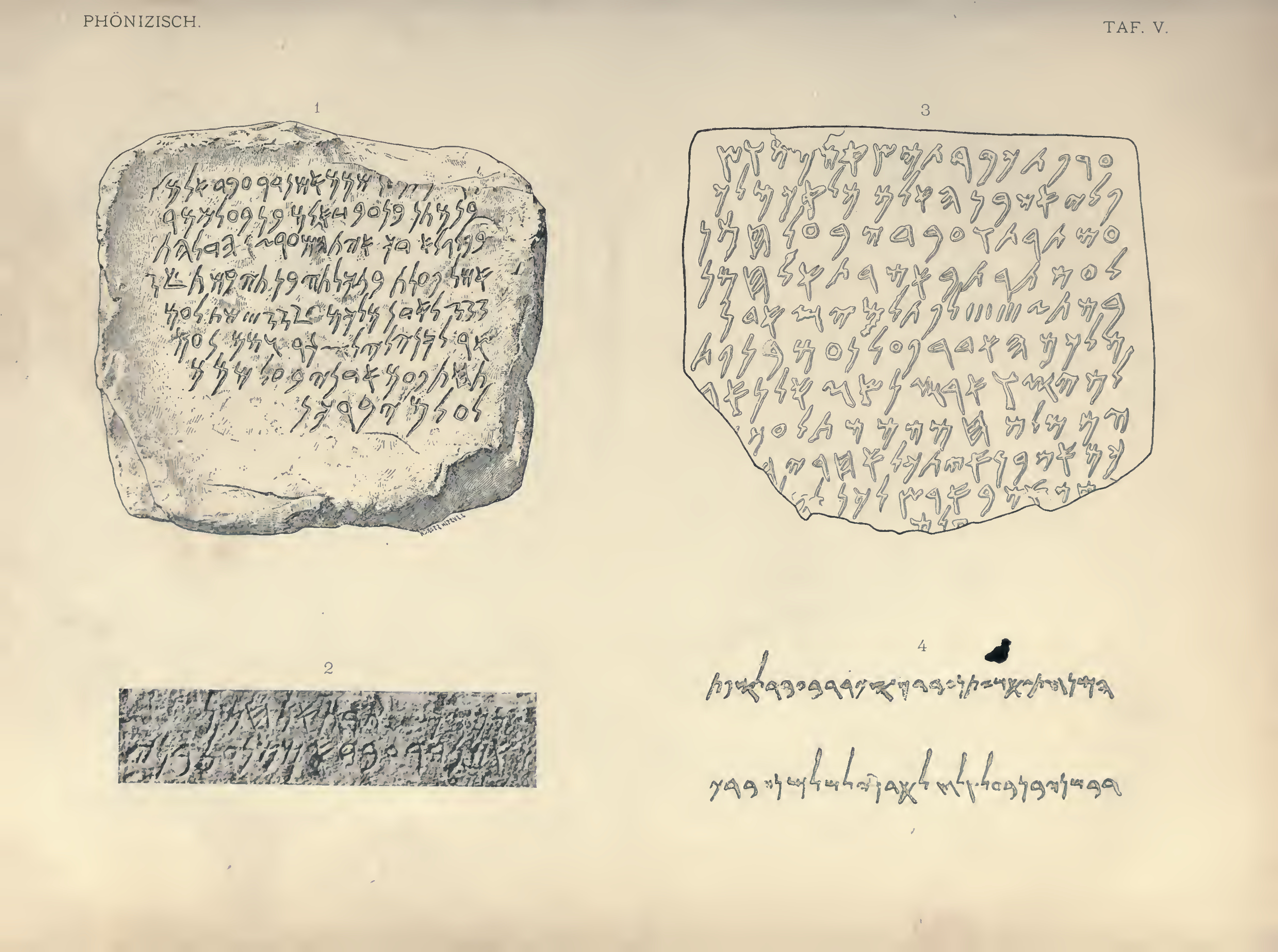
Page from the NE, showing Phoenician inscriptions.

The Handbuch der Nordsemitischen Epigraphik, nebst ausgewählten Inschriften ('Handbook of North-Semitic epigraphy, together with selected inscriptions;' often abbreviated NE) is a two-volume reference work on Canaanite and Aramaic inscriptions by Mark Lidzbarski, published in 1898.

It became a foundational manual for the field of Semitic epigraphy.

== History ==
Conceived as a comprehensive handbook of Canaanite and Aramaic inscriptions, the Handbuch contained texts, readings, references, and selected facsimiles.

It was subsequently eclipsed by later standard corpora such as Kanaanäische und Aramäische Inschriften (KAI), and the Textbook of Aramaic Documents from Ancient Egypt (TADAE) for Egyptian Aramaic.

== Contents ==
- Volume I (Text): Introductions to scripts, readings, and extensive bibliographies
- Volume II (Plates): Facsimile tables of inscriptions (46 plates).

== Related and subsidiary publications ==
In the same way that the Répertoire d'Épigraphie Sémitique (RES) functioned as a companion to the Corpus Inscriptionum Semiticarum (CIS), Lidzbarski published further works related to the Handbuch:

- Ephemeris für semitische Epigraphik (ESE): 3 vols., Giessen: J. Ricker / Töpelmann, 1902–1915 (vol. 1 = 1900–1902; vol. 2 = 1903–1907; vol. 3 = 1909–1915). Conceived to publish new finds and to re-discuss previously published texts, updating and correcting the Handbuch.
- Altsemitische Texte, Heft 1: Kanaanäische Inschriften (KI): Giessen: A. Töpelmann, 1907. A reader for students with brief notes, intended “primarily for lectures”; in the preface Lidzbarski explicitly directs teachers to show reproductions for the Handbuch and Ephemeris. Although published as Heft 1 (Volume 1), no further volumes were published.

== Concordance ==
Name	NE	KI
Punic-Libyan bilinguals	433,c	93
Cippi of Melqart	425f	53
Carpentras Stele	448b1	
Pococke Kition inscriptions	420,4	19, 23, 27, 28
Benhisa inscription	426,3	55
Phoenician Harpocrates statues	424	44
Nora Stone	427c	60
Athenian Greek-Phoenician inscriptions	424,1–3, 425,1–5	45–52
Tripolitania Punic inscriptions	434, B-a	
Elephantine papyri and ostraca		
Mdina steles	426,2	54
Carthaginian tombstones		74
Humbert Carthage inscriptions	431, 9; 432, 16	
Turin Aramaic Papyrus		
Blacas papyrus		
Falbe Punic inscriptions	431, 10	75
Reade Punic inscriptions		
Limyra bilingual	446b	
Abu Simbel Phoenician graffiti	423b	43
Ain Nechma inscriptions	437	
Kellia inscription	420,5	24
Marseille Tariff	428	63
Nimrud ivory inscriptions		
Assyrian lion weights	446c	
Phoenician metal bowls		
Anat Athena bilingual	422,1	35
Bourgade inscriptions	436,3–12	
Sarcophagus of Eshmunazar II	417,2	7
Gozo stele	426,4	56
Serapeum Offering Table	448a2	
Cirta steles	433,1–9 and 434,10–12	94–99
Carthage Tariff	429b	66
Son of Baalshillek marble base	430,7	73
Carthage tower model	432, 14	
Bodashtart inscriptions		8–10
Kition Resheph pillars	420,1	18, 30
Ankh-Hapy stele	448b2	
Pauli Gerrei trilingual inscription	427b	59
Baalshamin inscription	418,d	12
Phoenician sun dial		
Umm al-Amad votive inscription	419,2	13
Cesnola Phoenician inscriptions		
Khaznadar inscriptions	431,11-13, 431,15	82–84
Hadrumetum Punic inscriptions	432,1–3	91–92
Mesha Stele	415	1
Abydos graffiti	423a	38–42
Idalion bilingual and Idalion Temple inscriptions	421,1–3	31–33
Yehawmilk Stele	416	5
Tharros Punic inscriptions		61–62
Royal Steward inscription		
Carthaginian slaughterhouse inscription	430,4	68
Carthaginian mother goddess inscription	430,6	72
Carthage Festival Offering inscription	430,3	67
Wilmanns Neopunic inscriptions	435,2, 437a	
Pricot de Sainte-Marie steles		76–80
Cherchell Neopunic inscriptions	439,2	
Bashamem inscription	427a	58
Baal Lebanon inscription	419	17
Saqqara Aramaic Stele	448a1	
Tayma stones	447,1–3	
Kition Tariffs		29
Adadnadinakhe bricks	446c	
Siloam inscription		3
Sant'Antioco bilingual	434,1	100
Palmyra Tariff		
Osorkon Bust		
Pierides Kition inscriptions		20, 25–26
Eshmun obelisk	420,2	21
Persephone Punic stele		71
Lilybaeum stele		57
Henchir Guergour Neopunic inscriptions		
Guelaât Bou Sbaâ Neopunic inscriptions		
Hegra Nabataean inscriptions		
Tyre Cistern inscription	418,c	
Tamassos bilinguals	421c	34
Masub inscription	419e	16
Tabnit sarcophagus	417,1	6
Panamuwa II inscription	442	
Madaba Nabataean Inscriptions		
Hadad Statue	440-2	
Abdmiskar cippus	418,3	11
Abdbaal the centurion inscription		
Maktar and Mididi inscriptions	436,11	
Bar-Rakib inscriptions	443, 444	
Neirab steles	445	
Sarıaydın inscription	446a	
Larnakas tis Lapithou pedestal inscription	422,2	36
Kilamuwa Stela		
Hasanbeyli inscription		
Kition Necropolis Phoenician inscriptions	420,3	22
Douïmès medallion	429,1	70
El Amrouni mausoleum	435b	101
Abiba’l inscription		
Arebsun inscriptions		
Tortosa bomos inscription		
El-Osiris inscription		
Avignon Punic inscription		64
Astarte and Tabit sanctuary dedication		69
Punic Tabella Defixionis		85
		88
Quintus Markius trilingual inscription		
Farasa bilingual inscription		
Phoenician Adoration steles		14–15
Banobal stele		37
KAI 140		
KAI 96		
Eshmun inscription		
Sibbolet funeral inscription		89
Stele of Zakkur		
Villaricos Phoenician stele		65
Assur ostracon and tablets		
Baal Hannon tomb inscription		87
		90
