= Villaricos Phoenician stele =

5th Century BCE funerary stele

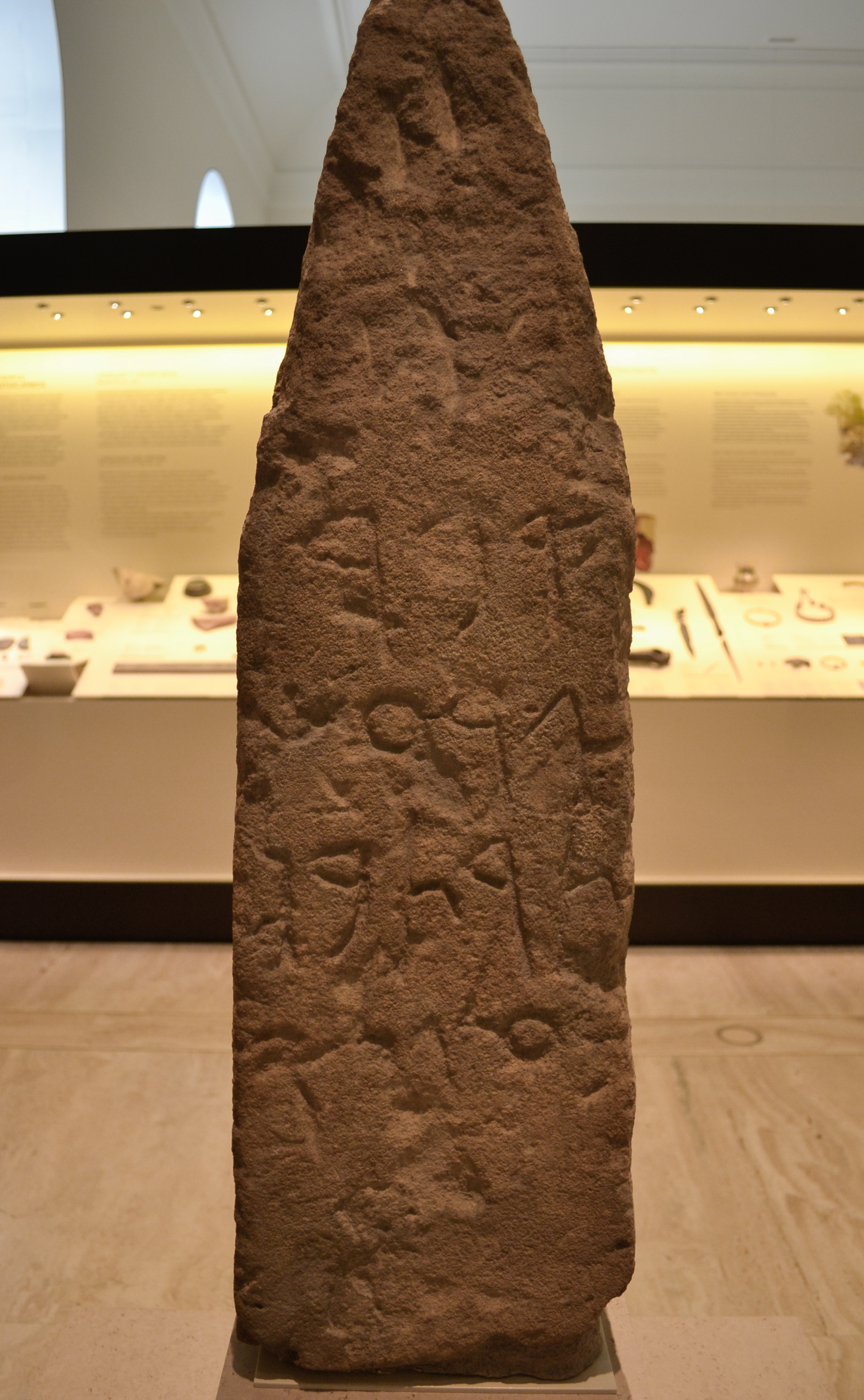
The Villaricos Phoenician stele on display

The Villaricos Phoenician stele is a 5th-century BCE Phoenician or Punic limestone funerary stele found in 1903–04 in the Villaricos necropolis, Spain. Villaricos is located south of Cartagena, which was once an ancient Punic city at the mouth of the river Almanzora. The stele was discovered by Luis Siret, who was conducting excavations in the region. Siret sent a photograph of the stele to Alfred Louis Delattre, a scholar of Punic epigraphy. Delattre, in turn, communicated the finding to the Académie des Inscriptions et Belles-Lettres in a letter to Philippe Berger in 1904. It is on display at the National Archaeological Museum in Madrid (Inv. no. 1907/32/7).

== Description ==
The four-line inscription on the stele (17 characters in total) reads: "Tomb of Gerashtart ("devotee of Astarte"), son of Baal-piles".

𐤒𐤁𐤓
𐤂𐤓𐤏𐤔
𐤕𐤓𐤕 𐤁𐤍
𐤁𐤏𐤋𐤐𐤋𐤎

The text is organized in four lines and is notable for the slight variation in the form of certain characters compared to typical Carthaginian inscriptions. This divergence suggests regional differences in Punic script, possibly influenced by local Iberian scripts or the isolation of Punic communities in Spain.

The inscription is 90 cm x 27 cm x 22 cm.

== Context ==
It was the first known Punic inscription that is considered indigenous to the Iberian Peninsula. This contrasts with the Phoenician Harpocrates statues, considered to have been later brought from outside the region.

Such inscriptions were common in the Punic world, where tomb markers often recorded the names of the deceased and their lineage. The mention of Baalpalès, a theophoric name invoking the god Baal, suggests a religious element to Punic society in Spain.

== Bibliography ==
- Delattre, Alfred Louis (1904). "Quelques inscriptions puniques. Lettre à M. Philippe Berger". Comptes rendus des séances de l'Académie des Inscriptions et Belles-Lettres (in French). 48 (1): 36–39. doi:10.3406/crai.1904.19618. ISSN 0065-0536.
- Zamora, J. á. (2019-02-28). "Phoenician epigraphy in the Iberian peninsula". Palaeohispanic Languages and Epigraphies. Oxford University Press. doi:10.1093/oso/9780198790822.003.0003. ISBN 978-0-19-879082-2.
- Costa, Benjamí; Ribas, Benjamí Costa; López, José Ángel Zamora (2021). Fuentes epigráficas fenicio-púnicas en Occidente (in Catalan). Eivissa: Museu Arqueològic d'Eivissa i Formentera. ISBN 978-84-87143-62-5.
- Siret, Louis (1907). "A propos de poteries pseudo - mycéniennes". L'Anthropologie (v. 18). Masson.
