= Kellia, Cyprus =

Kellia: Κελλιά (Greek); Yıldırım (Turkish)
- Village
- Location in Cyprus
- Coordinates: 34°58′32″N 33°37′20″E
- Country: Cyprus
- District: Larnaca District

Population (2011)
  - Total: 387
- Time zone: UTC+2 (EET)
  - Summer (DST): UTC+3 (EEST)

Kellia (Greek: Κελλιά [locally [t͡ʃeˈʎa]]; Turkish: Yıldırım) is a village in the Larnaca District of Cyprus, located north of Larnaca. Prior to 1974, the village was inhabited mostly by Turkish Cypriots. In 2011, its population was 387.

== Church and inscription ==
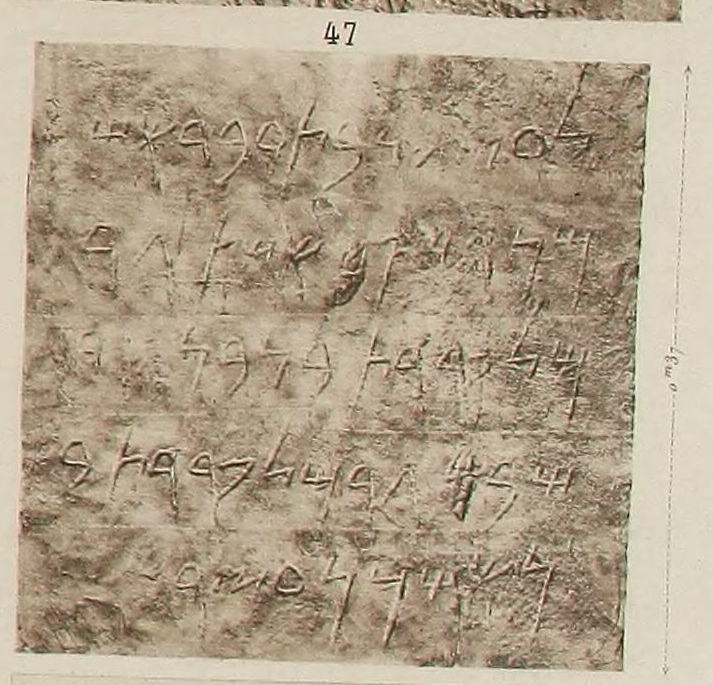
A copy of the Kellia inscription in Corpus Inscriptionum Semiticarum (CIS I 47)

St Antonios (Greek: Άγιος Αντώνιος Κελλιά) is the church name of the village and was built at around the 19th century. The Phoenician Kellia inscription was found in the church in 1844 by Ludwig Ross.

The name Kellia is thought to come from 'cells', a reference to the monastic cells found at the church.
