= Gozo stele =

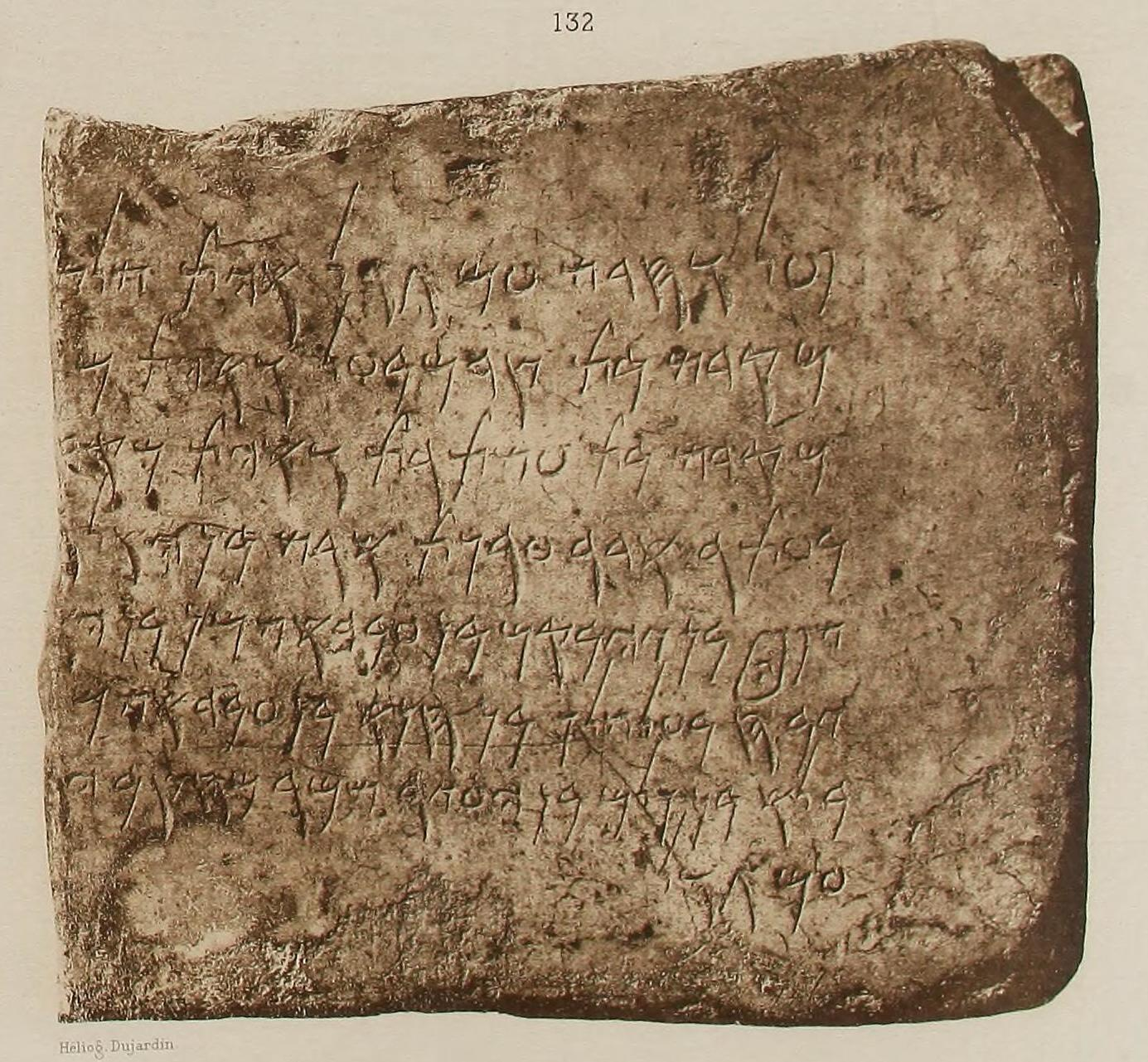
The Gozo stele

The Gozo stele is a Phoenician language inscription found on Gozo, Malta in 1855. It is currently in the Gozo Museum of Archaeology.

It was first published by Italian orientalist Michelangelo Lanci in his Ragionamento di Michelangelo Lanci intorno a nuova stela fenicia discoperta in Malta, and subsequently by Honoré Théodoric d'Albert de Luynes in his appendix to his treatise on the Sarcophagus of Eshmunazar II. The inscription was presented to Lanci by the Italian Abbot Don Luigi Marchetti, who was stationed on the island of Malta. A number of scholars questioned its authenticity, but consensus subsequently grew that it was genuine.

It became known as Melitensia Quinta ("Maltese 5th"), following the terminology used by Gesenius for the four previous Maltese inscriptions (the Cippi of Melqart and the Mdina steles). It is also known as KAI 62 or CIS I 132.

== Text of the inscription ==
The inscription commemorates the rebuilding of a series of temples. It reads:

(line 1)	P‘L WḤDŠ ‘M GWL ’YT ŠLŠ[T MQDŠM ... ... W’YT]	The people of Gaulos (the island of Gozo) rebuilt (lit.: made and restored) the thre[e sanctuaries ... and]
(2)	MQDŠ BT ṢDMB‘L W’YT M[QDŠ BT ... ... W’YT]	the sanctuary of the temple of Ṣadam-Ba‘al (Salammbo), and the sanc[tuary of the temple of ... and]
(3)	MQDŠ BT ‘ŠTRT W’YT MQD[Š BT ... ...]	the sanctuary of the temple of ‘Astarte and the sanctu[ary of the temple of ...]
(4)	B‘T R ’DR ‘RKT ’RŠ BN Y’LP[‘L ... ...]	in the time of the magistracy of the Leader of the Bureau of Public Works ’Aris the son of Iolp[a‘ol ...
(5)	ŠPṬ BN ZYBQM BN ‘BD’ŠMN BN Y’[LP‘L ... ...]	...]safoṭ(?) the son of Zīboq(?) the son of ‘Abd’esmūn the son of Io[lpa‘ol ...]
(6)	ZBḤ B‘LŠLK BN ḤN’ BN ‘BD’ŠM[N ... ...]	The sacrificial priest was Ba‘alsillek the son of Ḥanno the son of Abd’esm[ūn ...
(7)	BL’ BN KLM BN Y‘ZR ŠMR MḤṢB Y’[... ...]	...] BL’ the son of KLM the son of Ya‘zor. The guard of the stone-quarry was I[ol-(?)... (?) a member of the]
(8)	‘M GWL	people of Gaulos.

== Bibliography ==
- Editio princeps: Lanci, Michelangelo [in Italian] (1855). Ragionamento di Michelangelo Lanci intorno a nuova stela fenicia discoperta in Malta. pe' tipi di Giovanni Ferretti.
- Caruana, A A 1899 Frammento Critico Della Storia Fenicio-Cartaginese, Greco-Romana Bisantina, Musulmana e Normanno-Aragonese Delle Isole di Malta, Valletta:Giov. Muscat
- Caruana, A. A. (1882). Report on the Phoenician and Roman Antiquities in the Group of the Islands of Malta. U.S. Government Printing Office.
- De Trafford A 1998 The Phoenician Connection and Lord Strickland's Bequest, in Manduca J (ed.), Treasures of Malta, Summer 1998 Vol IV No 3 37–41, 91
- Heltzer, M 1993 The Inscription CIS, 1, 132 from Gozo and the Political Structure of the Island in the Punic Period, in Frendo, A J (ed.), Journal of Mediterranean Studies, Vol 3 No 2 198-204
- P. W. File 1235/40 1940 Bequest of two Phoenician Inscriptions by Lord Strickland to Government
- Strickland, G 1969 Malta and the Phoenicians, (edited by Strickland, M) Valletta: Progress Press
- Vella, H C R 1995 Gozo in Classical Literature in Brigulio, L and Bezzina, J (eds), Gozo and its Culture, 13-48
- William Wright, 1874 On the Phoenician Inscription generally known as the 'Melitensis Quinta', in Transactions of the Society of the Biblical Archaeology, Vol III 389-399
