= Cherchell Neopunic inscriptions =

Marble inscriptions from Algeria

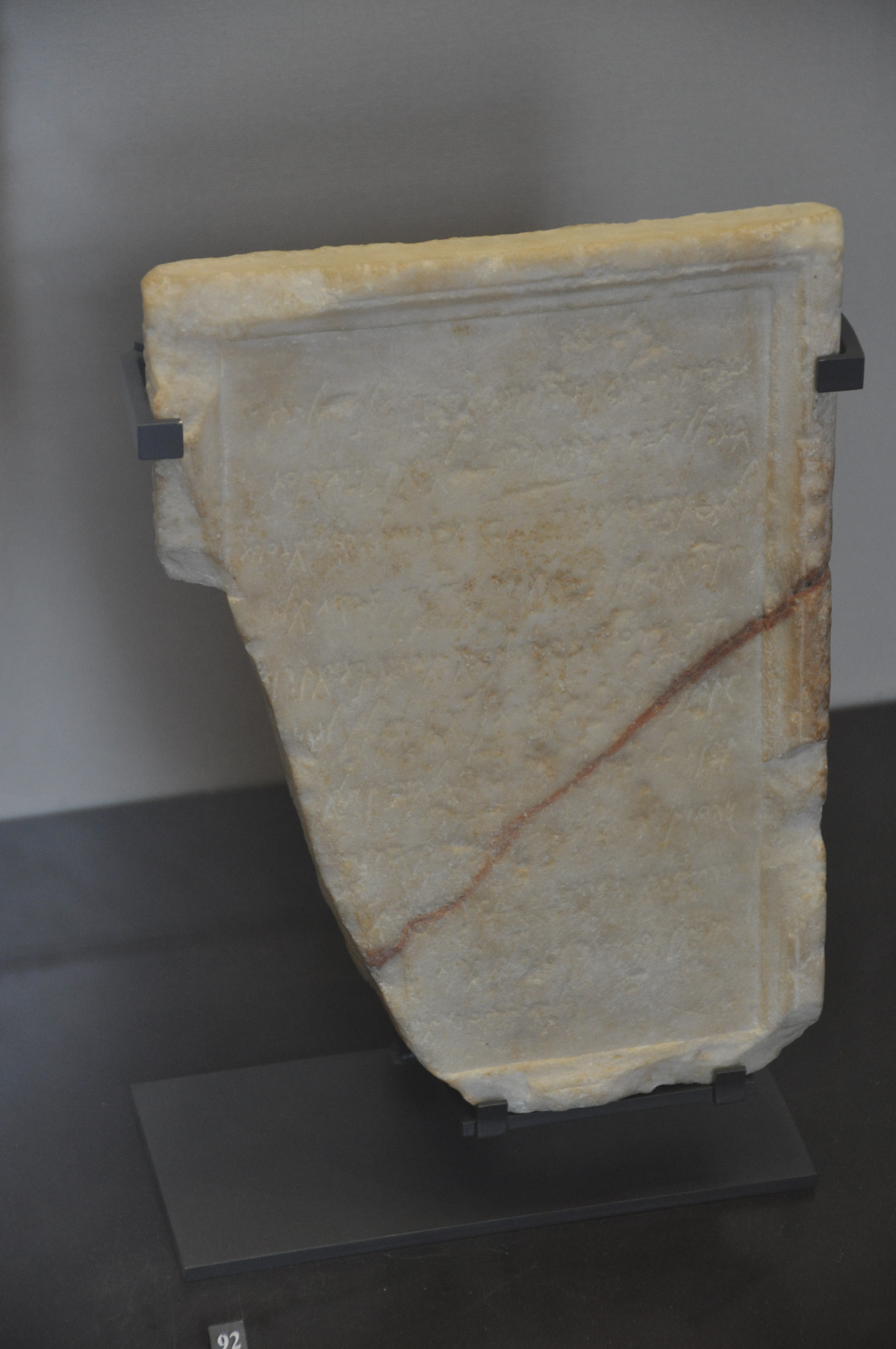
The Micipsa inscription at the Louvre.

The Cherchell Neopunic inscriptions are two Neopunic inscriptions on marble discovered in 1875 and 1882 in Cherchell in French Algeria. They are currently in the Louvre, known as AO 1028 and AO 5294.

Both were acquired by the Louvre from Achille Schmitter, collector of customs in Cherchell, with assistance from Antoine Héron de Villefosse.

The second stele mentions Micipsa, son of Masinissa, and is dated to 118 BCE.

A prior Neopunic inscription was discovered in Cherchell in 1847, published in 1859, on a copper alloy cymbal.

== Funerary pillar (AO 5294) ==
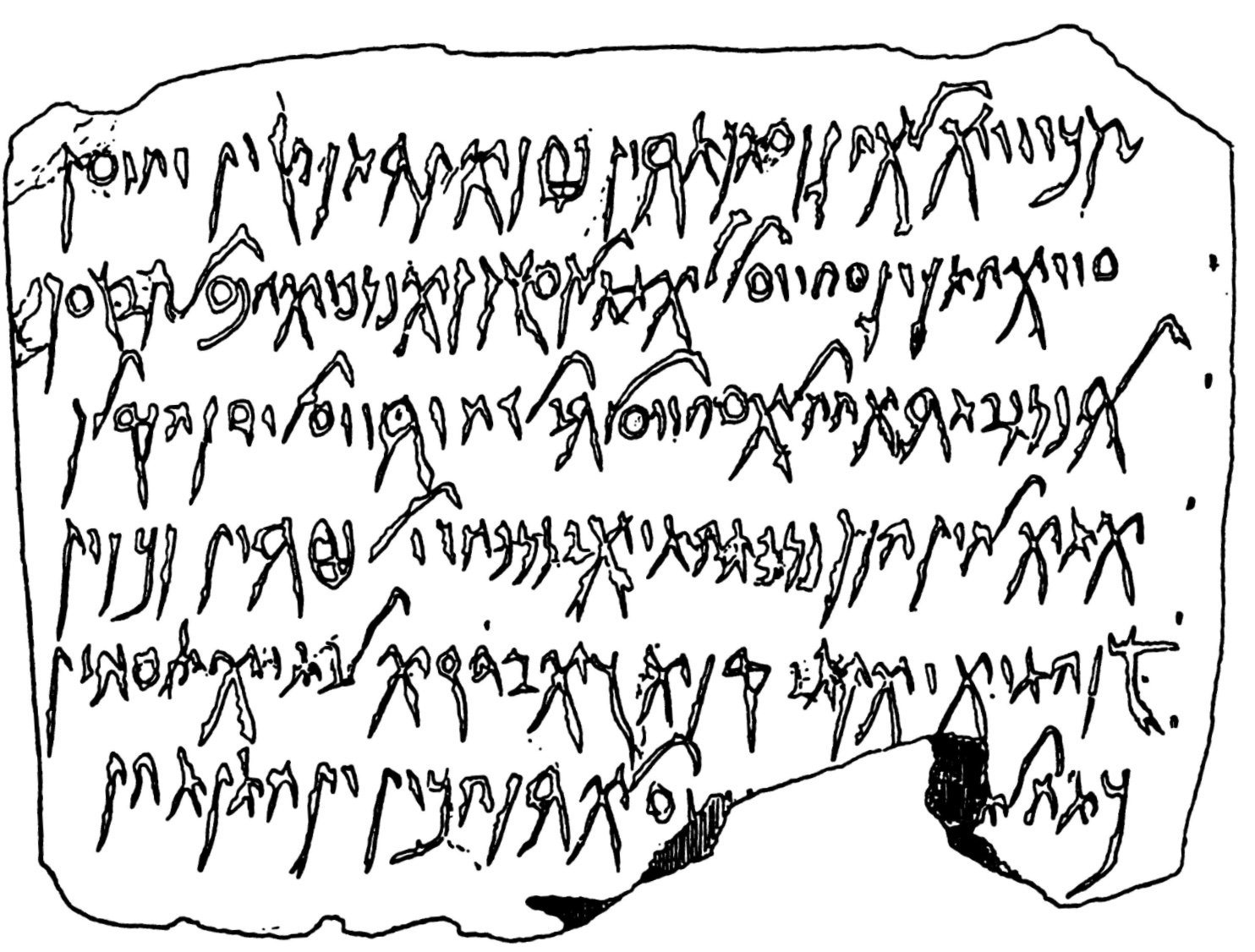
Cherchell funerary pillar inscription. It is held in the archives of the Louvre (not on public display)

This inscription was discovered in February 1875 in a field, on the road to Tenès. It first became the property of a baker from Cherchell, who sold it to Achille Schmitter, collector of customs in Cherchell.

It is engraved on a white marble cube, 17cm × 24cm, and consists of six well-preserved "Neopunic" lines, except however for the sixth line which has a gap. The inscription is a dedication by a daughter to her mother.

The inscription reads:

(1)	SKR BR’ L’ŠT N‘MT MHRT ṬN ’T HMṢBT RŠ B‘T	(This is) an enduring memorial to a woman who was teachable and intelligent; this matzebet was erected by Rosh, daughter of
(2)	‘BD’ŠMN BN ‘ZRB‘L L’M’ LT‘WNT ’ḤR ’Š P‘L ṢYW‘N	'Abd-Eshmun, son of Hasdrubal, to her mother, to T‘WNT, after a monument had been made
(3)	LHḤYM H’Š ŠL’ ‘ZRB‘L HYLD ŠḤRB‘L B‘N ŠQLN	for the living by Hasdrubal, the youth. ŠḤRB‘L, son of ŠQLN,
(4)	’M’ LŠRT ŠNT ḤMŠM B’Y ḤŠBR LṬHRT NKTBT	his mother, who submitted for fifty years on the island of ḤŠBR to proscribed purification,
(5)	WNŠMR’ R’T MY QN’ W’Y DR’ LŠMR’ M‘ŠRT	and kept herself from seeing the waters of the reeds, and (the) island of DR’, to keep herself pure.
(6)	KMŠLM[T ‘L TMT P]‘L‘ HNŠKBT BT ŠMNM ŠT	She was reward[ed for her wo]rk, dying (at) age eighty.

== Micipsa inscription (AO 1028) ==
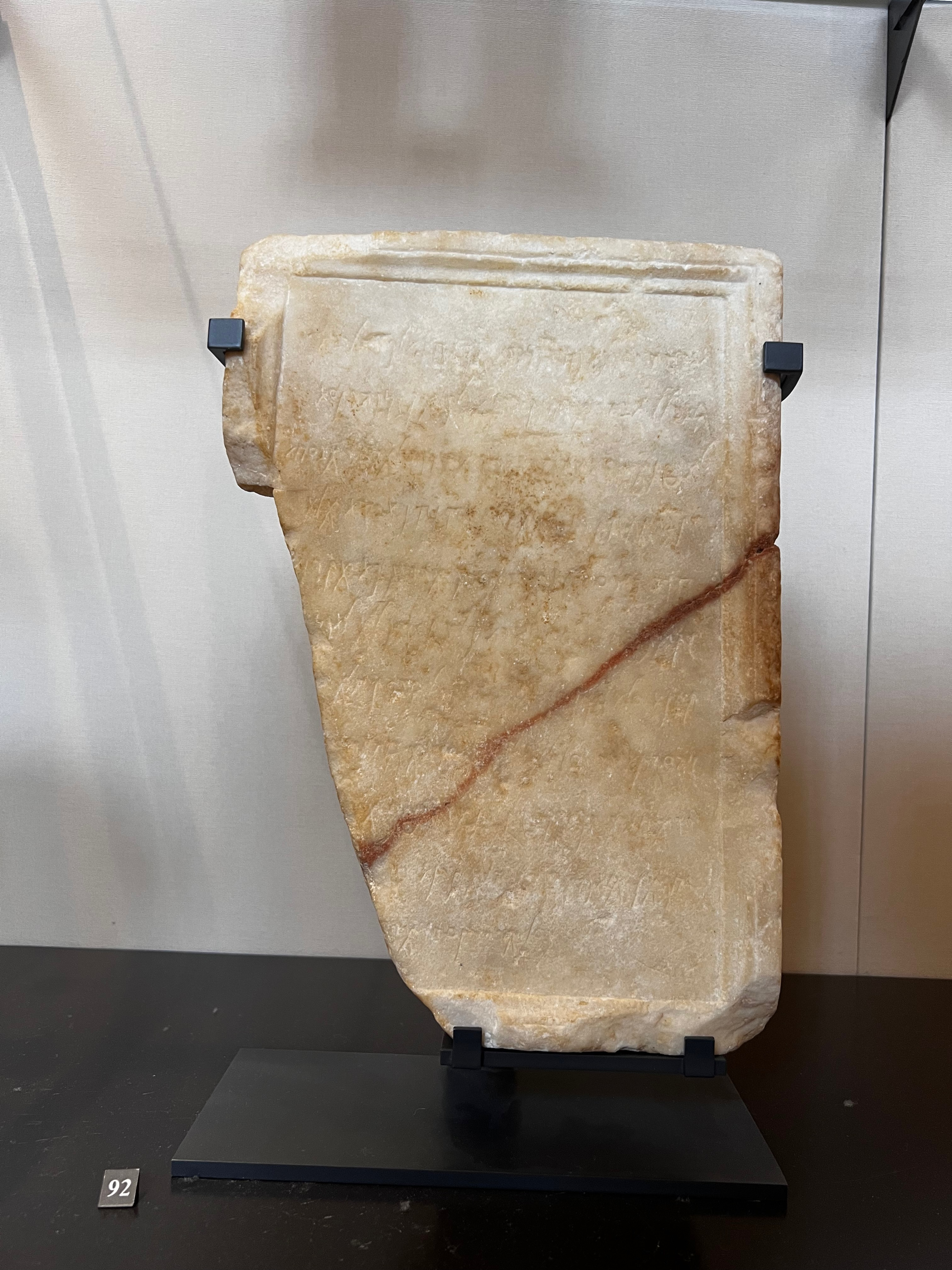
The Micipsa inscription

The Micipsa was acquired by the Louvre in 1882 from Schmitter; it is thought to have originated in the Porte de Tenez, where Schmitter reported making other discoveries. The inscription consists of eleven lines of Neopunic, engraved on white marble with red veins of red, measuring 30cm × 22cm.

The inscription reads:

(1)	MYQDŠ QN’M ḤY ḤYM MKPZN MLK [M]ŠLYYM	Sanctuary of mine, life of the living, Micipsa, king of (the) [Ma]ssylii,
(2)	HMYLL MYŠR ’RṢT RBT MMLK’T ḤŠB N‘M	who is extolled, sovereign of broad lands, prince who devises good
(3)	L’ ṬN’ T HM’Š ZT[...]’Ḥ[.]‘L’ QBR’ Y‘ZM	to him, this statue was erected... his grave, (by) Ya'azan,
(4)	BN YŠGGZN BN BG’T BN MZNZN MYQM ’LM	son of Yazaggasan, son of Bogud, son of Massinissa, responsible for sacralities,
(5)	ZKY KRR ‘LGM’.. TM’ ’.. ’KM’T BN[M]	...
(6)	WT ’KHN[.]M ’Š ‘L[..]M KL’ [.]‘[..]L’ LMḤ[..]....	...in his lifet(i)me...
(7)	T[.]NM ‘LM ‘K[..]T LḤ[..]’ [.] LHR‘T ŠL’.........	...eternal sleep...
(8)	WŠ‘WTM [..] B‘L [..]L[..]’[..]M’ HŠM.............	...
(9)	[..]’ ŠL’ BKL ḤWT BN’ [..]Ṭ[.]’.............	...during all the life (of his son?)...
(10)	[.]Ṣ’T HMḤ[.]T ŠL’ T[.]NM R[.].............	...
(11)	P‘L’ [..]Š BN [...]’..........	Made by [...]Š, son of...

In Kanaanäische und Aramäische Inschriften, the offered reading is:

MYQDŠ QN’M ḤY ḤYM MKWSN MLK [M]ŠLYYM
HMYLL MYŠR ’RṢT RBT MMLK’T ḤŠB N‘M
L’ ṬN’ T HM’Š ST BMD W’ḤDR DL ’QBR’ Y‘ZM
BN YZGGSN BN BG’T BN MSNSN MYQM ’LM
SKR KBD ‘L GM ’DR TM’ ’DR’ KM ’TRNM
WT ’KHNYM ’Š ‘L MRM KL’ N‘SP L’ LMḤ[..]
TZNM ‘L M‘KBRT L-K-’M BLHB‘T Z’[...]
WŠ‘ WTMRDR ‘L Q[N]M LBN[..]M’ HŠM[.....]
RB’ S-’ BKL ḤWT BN’ BMṬ‘’[.......]
RṢ’T HMḤṢRT ŠL’ TBNM RB[........]
P‘L ’RŠ BN ‘BD’ BN [.........]

== Bibliography ==
- Berger, Philippe (1889). Inscription néopunique de Cherchell en l'honneur de Micipsa: par Philippe Berger (PDF) (in French). E. Leroux.
