= Douïmès medallion =

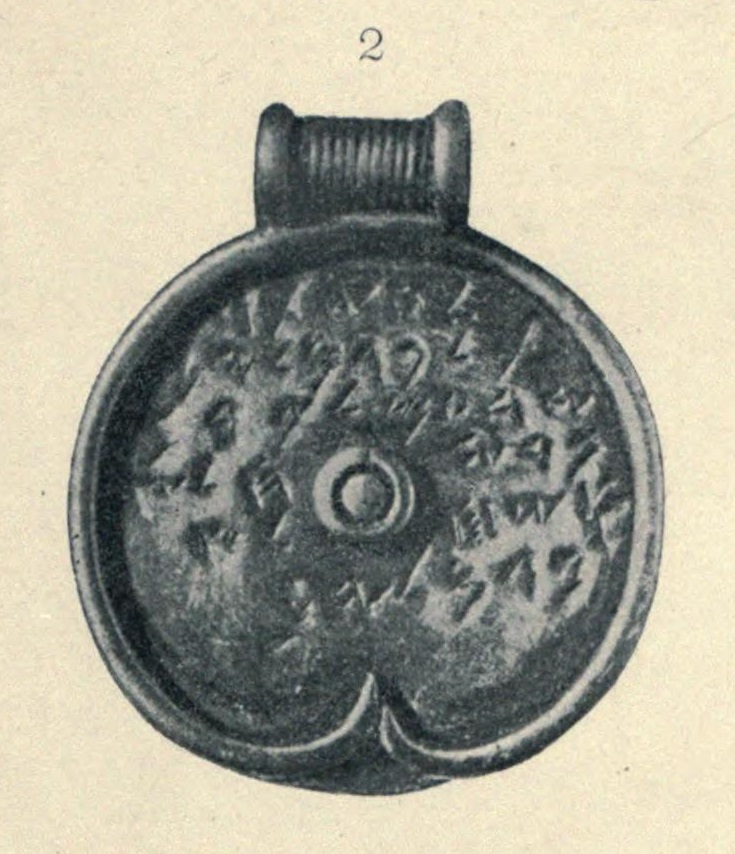
- Carthaginian medallion from Lidzbarski's Handbuch der Nordsemitischen Epigraphik Table II (cropped)
- Created: c. 700 BC
- Discovered: 1894; Tunisia

The Douïmès medallion is a small gold medallion found in 1894 in the Douïmès Necropolis of ancient Carthage. It is the oldest known Phoenician-Punic inscription found in North Africa. It has been described by Donald Harden as the “earliest Punic text at Carthage of any consequence - perhaps the earliest of all”. It is currently at the Carthage National Museum.

The inscription, known as KAI 73, includes a reference to pgmlyn, understood as Pygmalion of Tyre, although scholars have "expressed disbelief" given the archaeological context. It has been assumed to have been produced earlier than its archaeological context.

The medallion's inscription reads:

| (1) | L‘ŠTR- | To Astar- |
| (2) | -T LPGMLYN | -te (and) to Pygmalion, |
| (3) | YD‘MLK BN | YD‘MLK, son of |
| (4) | PDY ḤLṢ | Padi, delivers |
| (5) | ’Š ḤLṢ | that which he delivers |
| (6) | PGMLYN | Pygmalion. |

== Bibliography ==
- RES 5
