= Carthage Festival inscription =

Punic-language inscription from Carthage

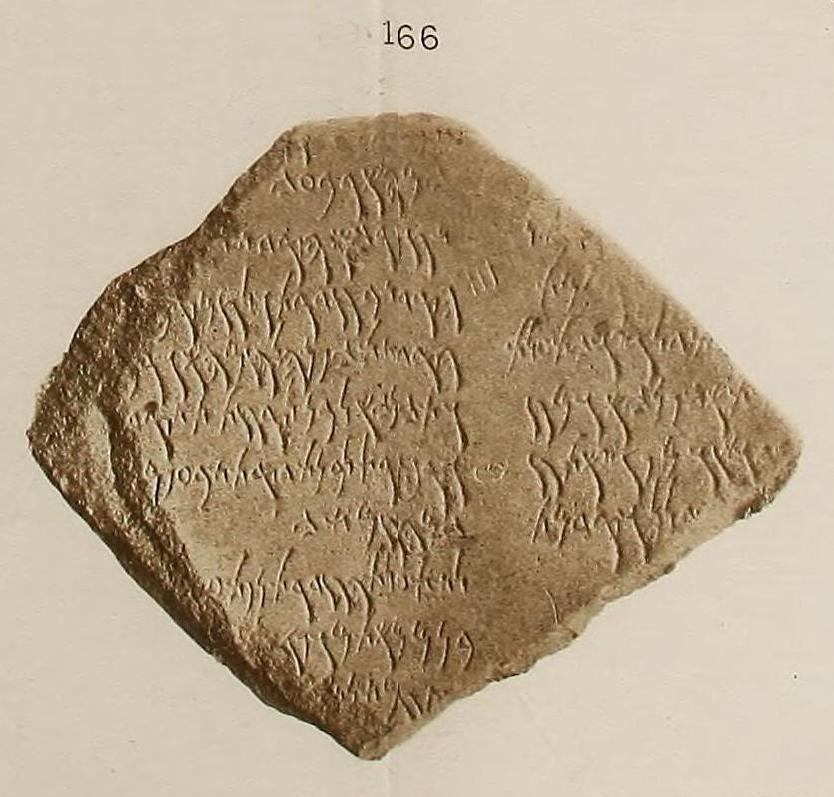
- Height: 15 cm
- Width: 16 cm
- Created: 4th or 3rd century BC
- Discovered: 1872; Tunis, Tunisia
- Present location: Turin, Piedmont, Italy
- Language: Punic

The Carthage Festival inscription or Carthage Festival Offering inscription (KAI 76; also known as CIS I 166; NE 430:3; KI 67; or NSI 44) is an inscription from Carthage in the Punic language that probably describes the liturgy of a festival of, at least, five days. It is dated to the fourth or third century BCE.

The inscription was found in 1872, in or near Carthage. It soon got lost, though its text had been recorded by means of squeeze papers. In 2004, the stele was found again in a depot of the Museo di Antichità di Torino (Turin Archaeology Museum), Italy. The text is carefully engraved in regular Punic letters in two columns on a white marble stele, and measures 16 by 15 cm.

== Interpretation ==
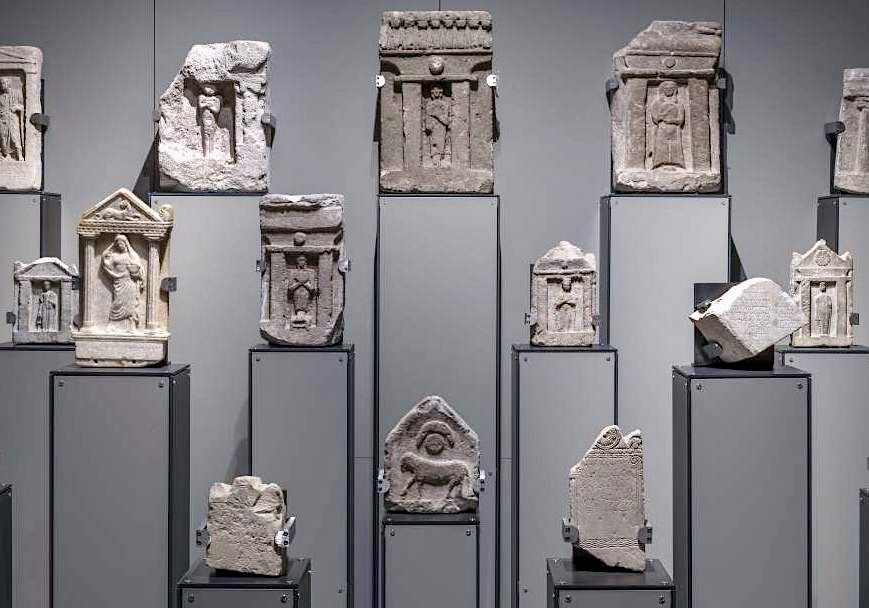
The Carthage Festival inscription on the right, in the Archaeological Museum of Turin. On the left is the Persephone Punic stele.

As the labels "On the fourth day" and "On the fifth day" (lines B.1,7) indicate, the text describes a ritual or procedure that would take several days. The parts of the inscription describing the procedure in the first two or three days are no longer extant. Because of the repeated use of words like "sacred", «BLL» and «QDMT» (both are specific kinds of offerings), "frankincense", et cetera, the text is usually interpreted as describing a religious practice, a festival of at least five days, possibly a spring festival («QDMT», animal 'first-fruits', are mentioned twice). It would make sense if such a stele was placed in a temple.

As an alternative reading Charles R. Krahmalkov has interpreted the text as "a medical procedure of five days duration". However, his translations in this sense are both incomplete (Krahmalkov does not translate the ill-fitting line B.9, apparently speaking of "200 boys"—a procession?), and they seem prejudiced: for example, the neutral word LḤM, "joiner", in lines B.3,4 he interprets as a "suture, a closure of a wound", and the enigmatic word ḤDRT (line B.8), usually meaning the Netherworld and here possibly referring to a sacred temple Chamber, is interpreted as "a swollen area, swelling of the skin". In addition, though one could expect a medical treatise to be written in a book, it seems improbable to inscribe it in extenso on a stele (unless of course the stele were placed in a hospital where patients were regularly treated in this way, but that seems very improbable).

== Text of the inscription ==
The inscription reads:

| (line A.1) | [... ...]L(?) | [The third day:(?)] (...) |
| (A.2) | [... ... BL]L(?) | ... flat-bread(?) (a food offering) |
| (A.3) | [... ...] QDMT | ... 'first-fruits' (an animal offered as a sacrifice) |
| (A.4) | [....]TD LSWYT ‘LT | ... for the dressing (garment) upon |
| (A.5) | [... Z]T ’Š KN Y’ WMḤ | ... oli]ves(?) that are fair and fat/juicy |
| (A.6-7) | [....] BBWṢ WMKS’ TḤ/[T] | ... in fine linen ('byssus cloth') and a covering bel[ow?) |
| (A.7) | [...] BLL WQDMT | ... flat-bread and (animal) 'first-fruits'. |
| (B.1) | YM H’RB‘Y | The fourth day: |
| (B.2) | ŠH PR Y’ HQDŠ [...] | Plants of fair fruits, the sacred ... |
| (B.3) | HQDŠ BḤDRT WLḤM QṬ[RT ...] | the sacred in the (sacred) Chamber, and 'bread' of inc[ense ... |
| (B.4) | HQDŠT YKN HLḤM H’ WRB[...] | the sacred one(s); the 'bread' shall he (He?) be; and many ... |
| (B.5) | WTYN Y’ LBN LQḤT TŠQD [...] | and figs, fair, white; you will pay attention(?) to take (them) ... |
| (B.6) | WQṬRT LBNT DQT ŠB’ KM[RM?...] | and [solid] incense ('breads'), (and) incense powder; seven pr[iests?? ...] |
| (B.7) | YM HḤMŠY | The fifth day: |
| (B.8) | LŠT ‘LT HḤDRT NPT ‘[...] | To put upon the (sacred) Chamber honey ... |
| (B.9) | BNM M’TM WKS[...] | two hundred boys(?) and ... |
| (B.10) | Ṭ HMŠT Š[...] | ... five ... |

== Similarity to Communion ==
Speaking in line B.4 of "sacred" objects (HQDŠT), the sentence «yakūn halèḥem hû’», He shall be the 'bread', reminds one of the Christian rite of the Holy Communion, where communicants consume bits of bread and wine which through transubstantiation are believed to have transformed into the body and blood of Jesus Christ. In Christianity the practice goes back to 1 Corinthians 11:24, where Christ at the Last Supper breaks a bread, saying "This is my body which is for you. Do this in remembrance of me".

Such sacramental meals were a common element in ancient mystery religions. The Carthaginian festival seems to present another example of this practice.
