= Kition Necropolis Phoenician inscriptions =

Archaeological site in Cyprus

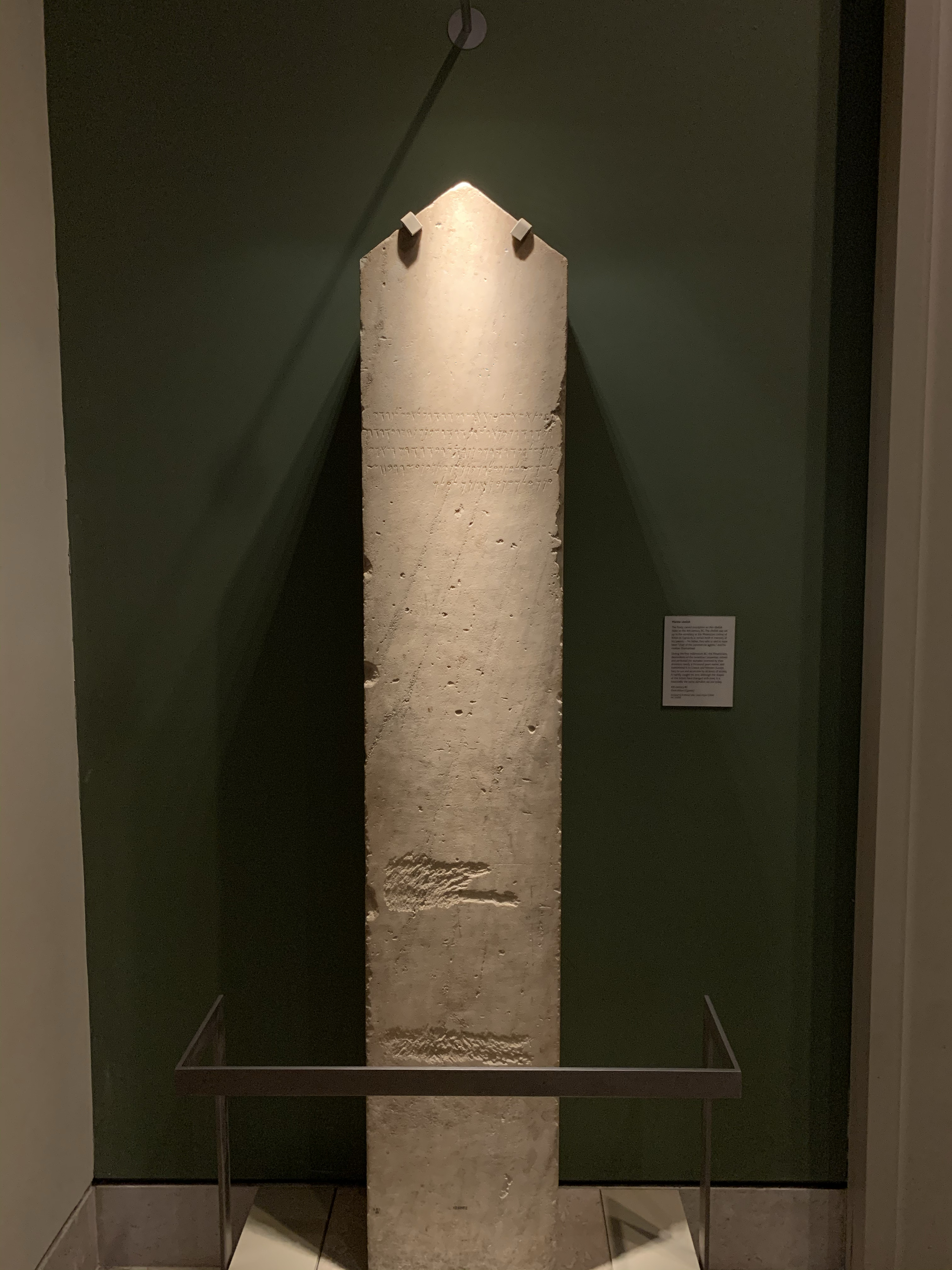
The inscription in the British Museum (KAI 34)

The Kition Necropolis Phoenician inscriptions are four Phoenician inscriptions discovered in the necropolis of Tourapi at Kition in 1894 by British archaeologist John Myres on behalf of the Cyprus Exploration Fund.

They currently reside in the British Museum, the Cyprus Museum and the Ashmolean Museum.

They are dated to the 4th century BCE.

The four inscriptions were first published in The Academy by George Albert Cooke, who later published the well known Text-book of North-Semitic Inscriptions (NSI) which included two of the inscriptions as NSI 21 and NSI 22.

== British Museum inscription ==
The inscription in the British Museum, known as BM 125082, and the inscription as KAI 34, is a white marble funeral stela with a rectangular shaft and triangular top. The inscription is in five lines.

== Gallery ==
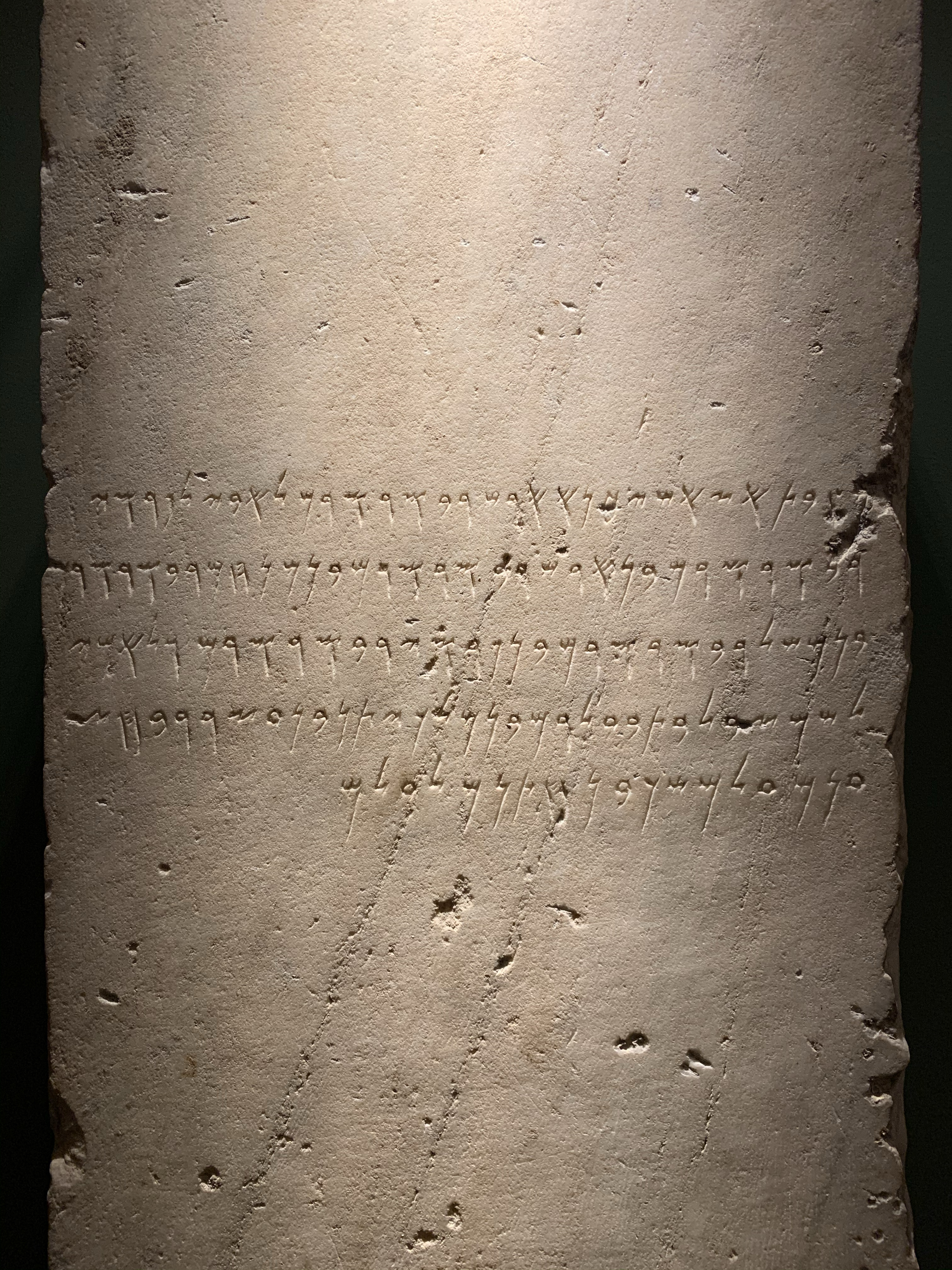
Close up of the inscription in the British Museum (KAI 34, NSI 21)

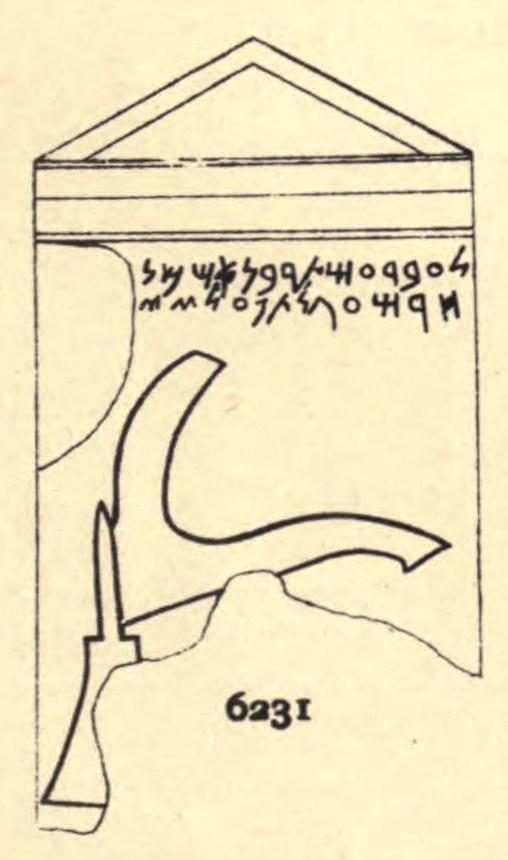
Inscription in the Cyprus Museum (NSI 22, RES 1207)

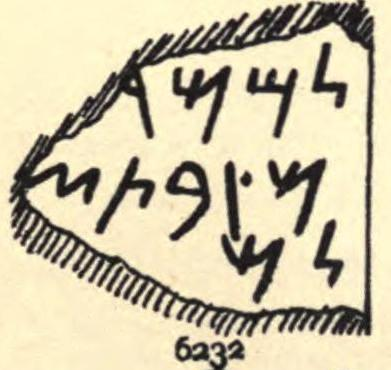
Inscription in the Cyprus Museum (RES 1208)
