= Kellia inscription =

Phoenician inscription from Cyprus

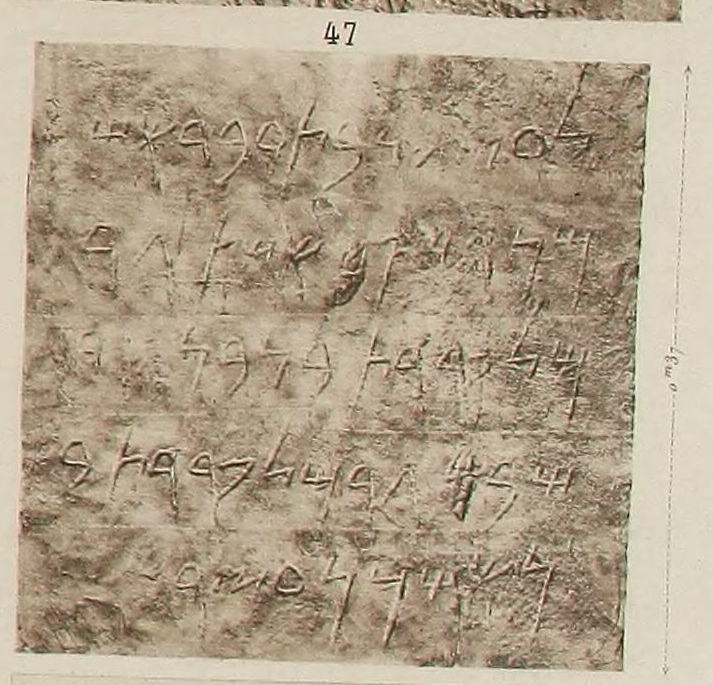
A copy of the inscription in Corpus Inscriptionum Semiticarum (CIS I 47)

The Kellia inscription is a Phoenician inscription found in the church of St Anthony in Kellia, Cyprus (Greek: Άγιος Αντώνιος Κελλιά) by Ludwig Ross in 1844. It is a funerary inscription of a noblewoman, the daughter of a Shophet. It is 1 foot wide and 2 and 3/4 feet high.

On its discovery, Ludwig Ross noted that he had been searching throughout Cyprus for inscriptions similar to the 33 Pococke Kition inscriptions found in 1738, but found only two:

I expected to find a greater number of Phoenician monuments on this island; but the ruins of the cities there have been used, at least since the times of the Lusignans and the Venetians, uninterruptedly as quarries for new buildings, and almost all of them have been razed to the ground. In addition, the usual material there is only a soft type of sandstone, which is much more easily subject to destruction than limestone or marble. It is due to these two reasons that Cyprus only grants a poor yield of both Greek and Phoenician inscriptions. In Kition and the surrounding area, where up to thirty (33) Phoenician inscriptions were counted in the last century, I have, in spite of the most persistent inquiries, been able to find only two. I found a third Phoenician inscription of six lines in the capital Nicosia, but so destroyed that hardly any letters were recognizable ... In the Church of Saint Anthony, in the village of Kellia, three quarters of an hour north of Kition, in the middle of a large stele made of white marble walled over one of the inner vaults of the church.

It is known as KAI 36 and CIS I 47.
