= Persephone Punic stele =

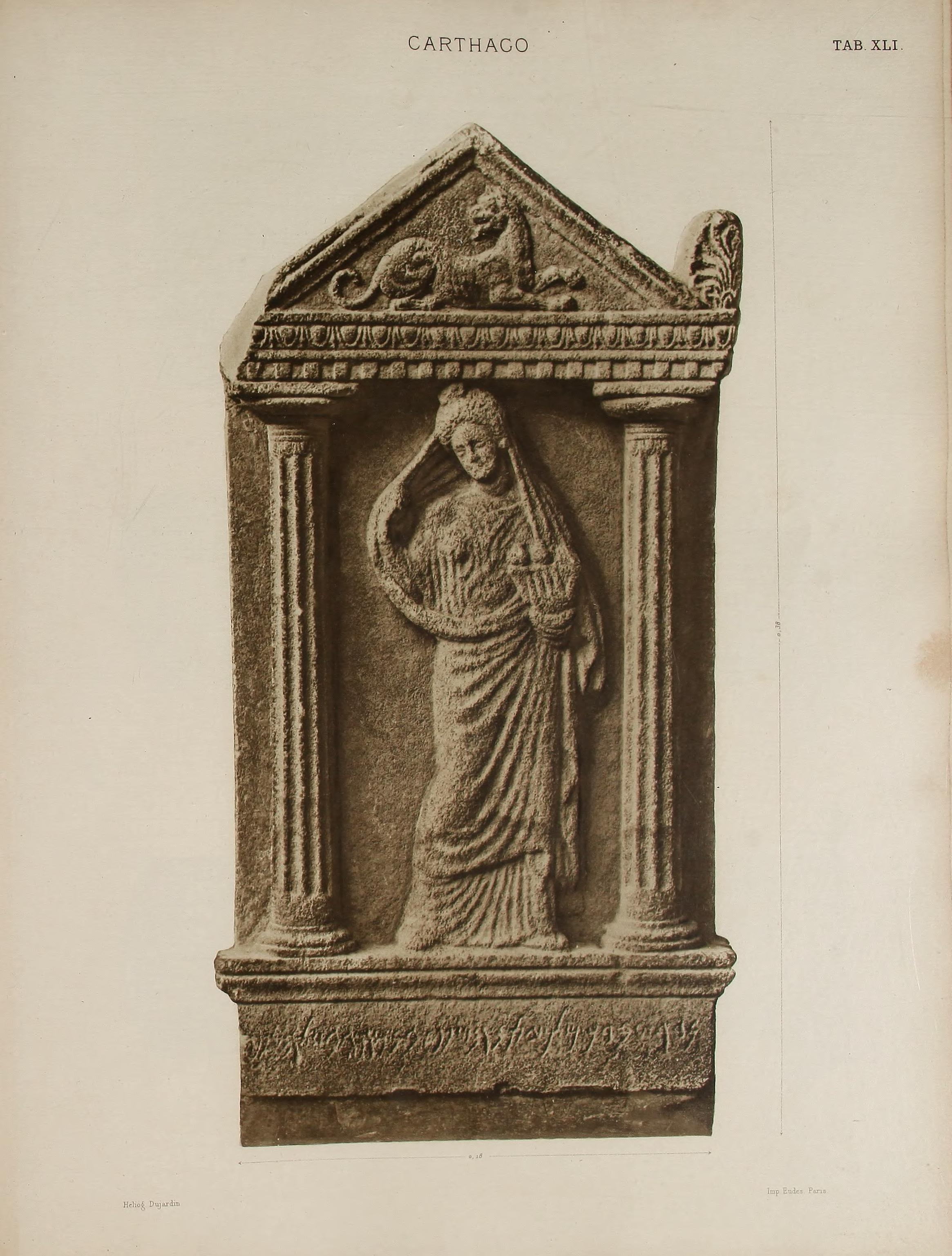
The stele, shown in the Corpus Inscriptionum Semiticarum

The Persephone Punic stele is a marble bas-relief stele of the Greek deity Persephone above a short punic inscription.

The stele is in the Turin Archaeology Museum, with inventory number 50782. The Punic inscription is known as KAI 82 and CIS I 176.

== Provenance ==
It was first published in 1881, although it had been in the Turin museum for several years prior. The museum's curator at the time - Ariodante Fabretti - sent material to Ernest Renan which Renan stated proved "that the monument entered the museum through the care of an Italian consul at La Goulette, and that, consequently, it comes from the ruins of Carthage."

However, in 1988 Maria Giulia Amadasi Guzzo and Serena Maria Cecchini argued that it may in fact come from Sardinia, like many of the other Punic artefacts in the Turin Museum: "The formula used in the inscription is known, but is not the most common among Carthage inscriptions... [but] is on the contrary very widespread in Sardinia: it is the rule on the Nora Stone and appears in four examples at Sulcis, where the inscribed stelae are few and often fragmentary".

== Description ==
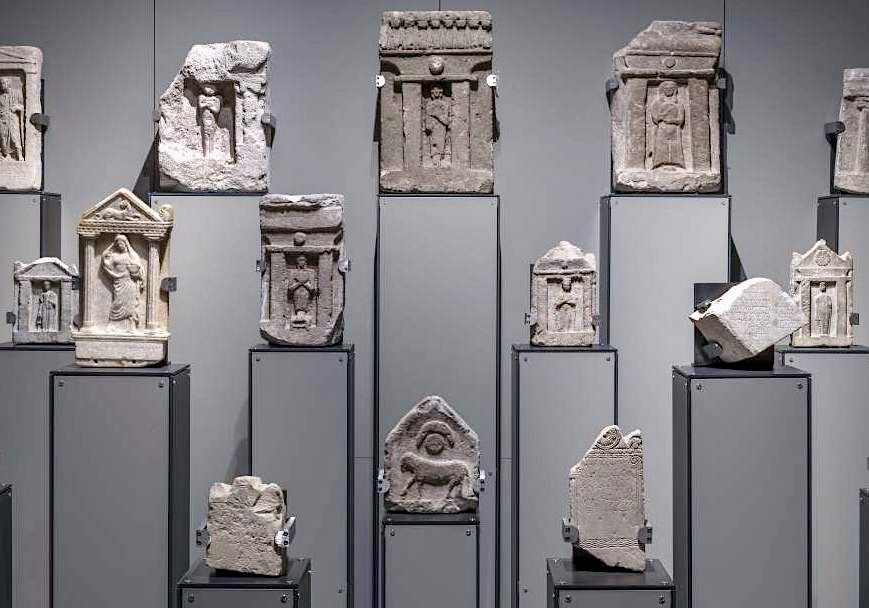
The Persephone Punic stele on the left, in the Archaeological Museum of Turin. On the right is the Carthage Festival inscription.

The stele measures 7 cm × 20 cm × 7 cm (2.8 in × 7.9 in × 2.8 in).

The image of Persephone includes a diadem on her head, covered by a headscarf, and she is holding a bouquet of flowers. It is framed by two Doric columns, below a triangular area containing a squatting panther with its head turned back. The right antefix has an eleven-leaf palmetto; the left hand side is broken.

== Inscription ==
The inscription has been read as follows:

- Transcription: ndr ʿbdk mlkytn hšpṭ bn mhrbʿl hšpṭ
- Translation: Vow of your servant MLKYTN the suffete, son of MHRBʿL the suffete.
