= Abdmiskar cippus =

Cippus discovered in Lebanon from c. 300 BCE

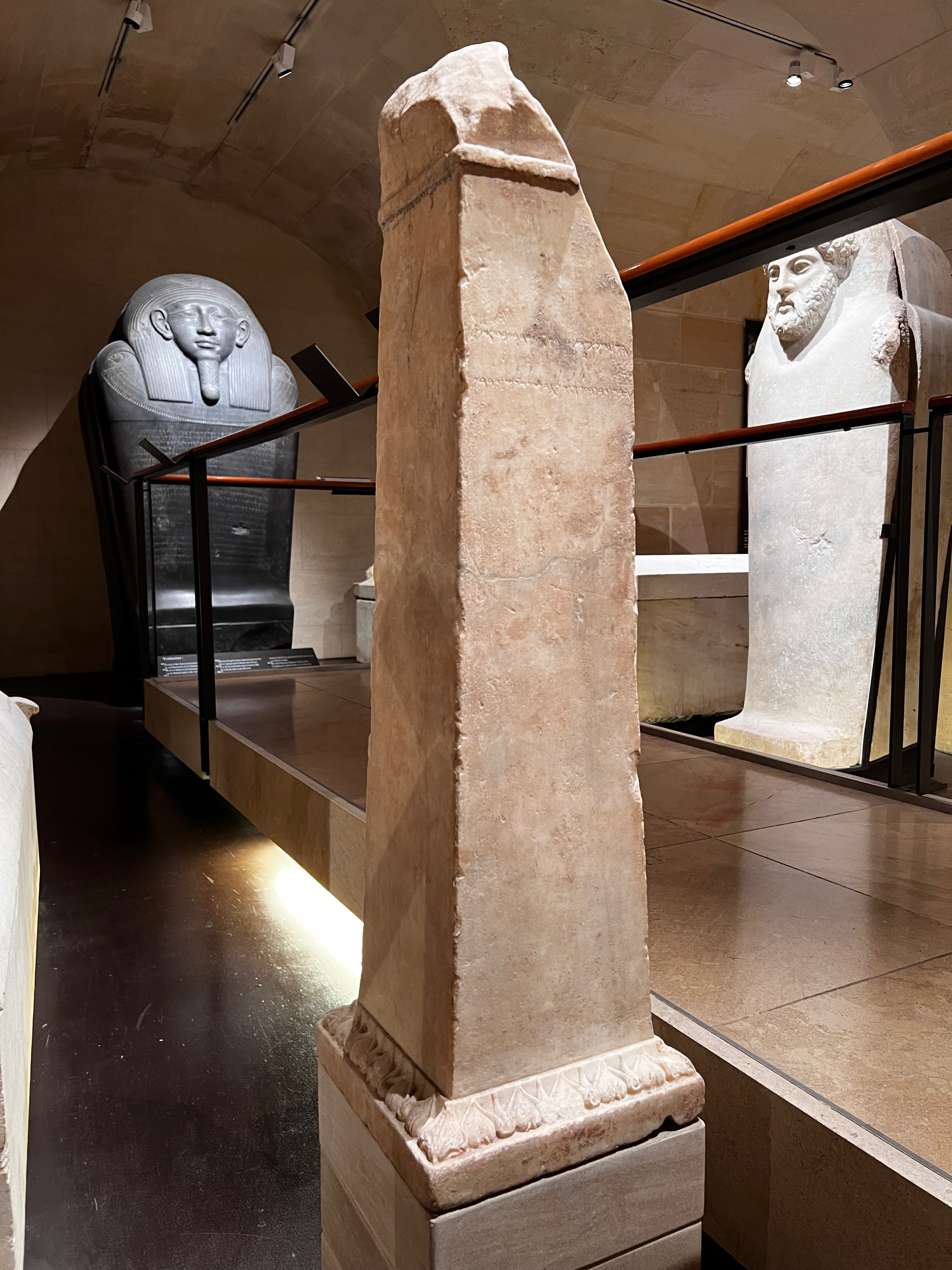
- The cippus at the Louvre, 2022
- Material: Marble
- Height: 1.05 meters
- Width: 30 cm
- Created: c. 300 BC
- Discovered: 1890; Sidon, South, Lebanon
- Discovered by: Joseph-Ange Durighello
- Present location: Paris, Ile-de-France, France
- Language: Phoenician

The Abdmiskar cippus is a white marble cippus in obelisk form discovered in Sidon, Lebanon, dated to 300 BCE. Discovered in 1890 by Joseph-Ange Durighello (son of the discoverer of the Sarcophagus of Eshmunazar II).

It contains a two line Phoenician inscription, stating that it represents an "offering made by Abdmiskar, son of Baalsillekh, to his lord Salman." It measures 105cm x 30cm x 30cm. It has been compared to the obelisks in the Temple of the Obelisks in Byblos.

Today it is on display at the Louvre (AO 1759 + 1762).

The inscription is known as KAI 282, RES 930, or the "fourth Sidonian".

== Gallery ==
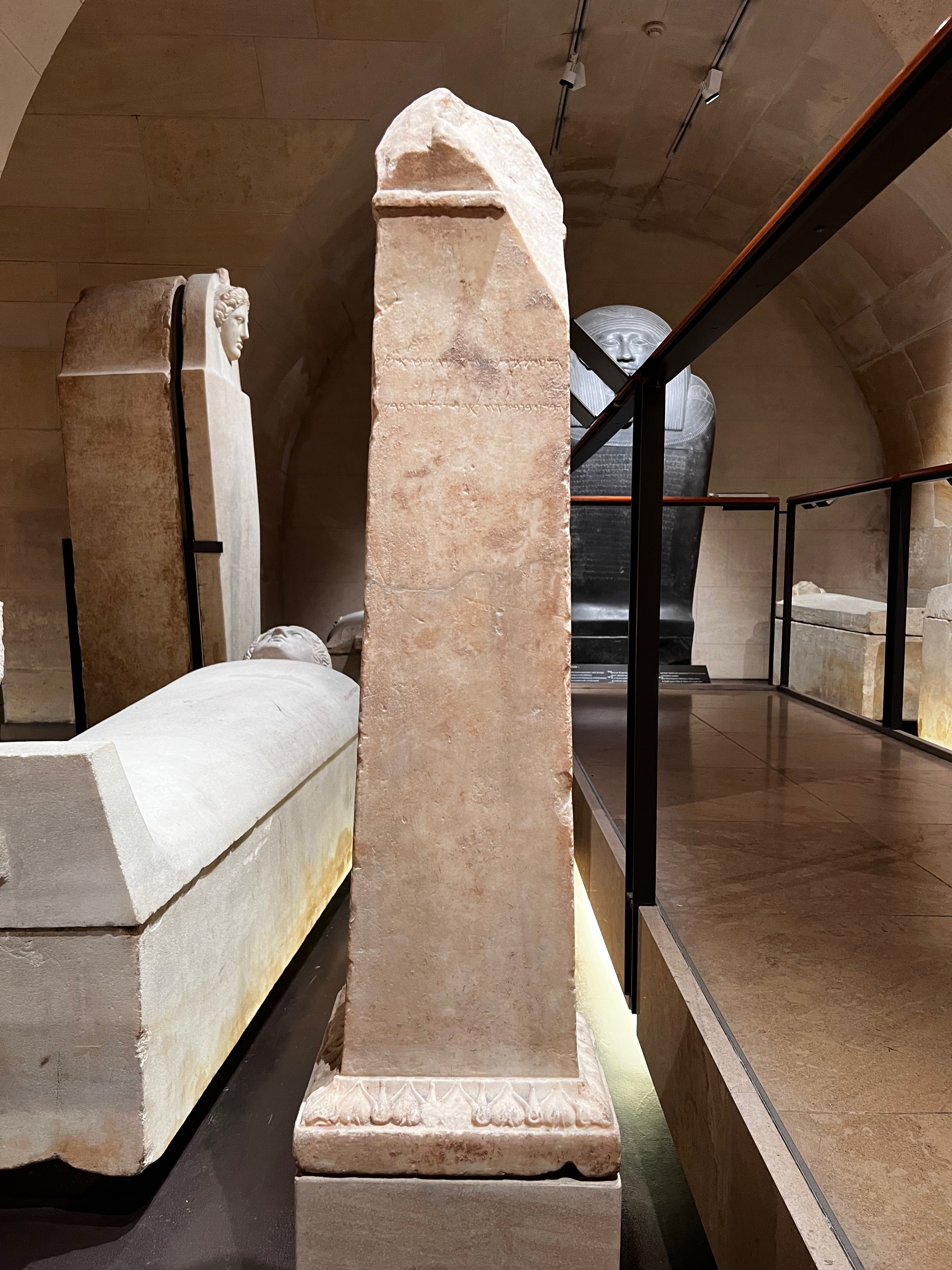
The cippus

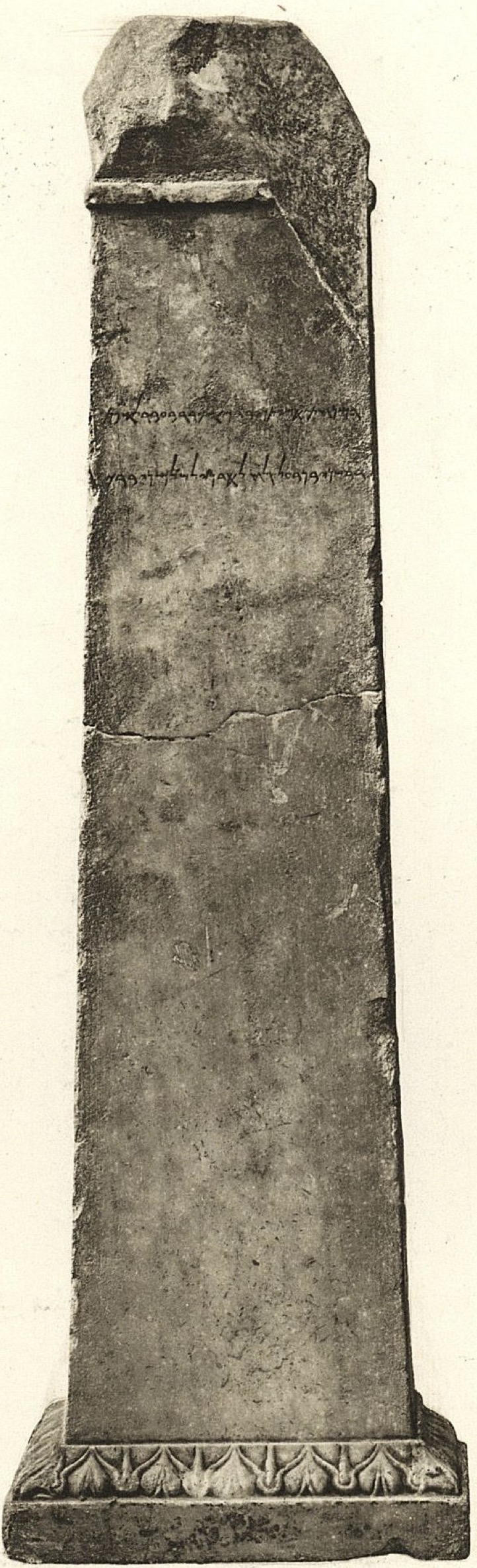
The cippus

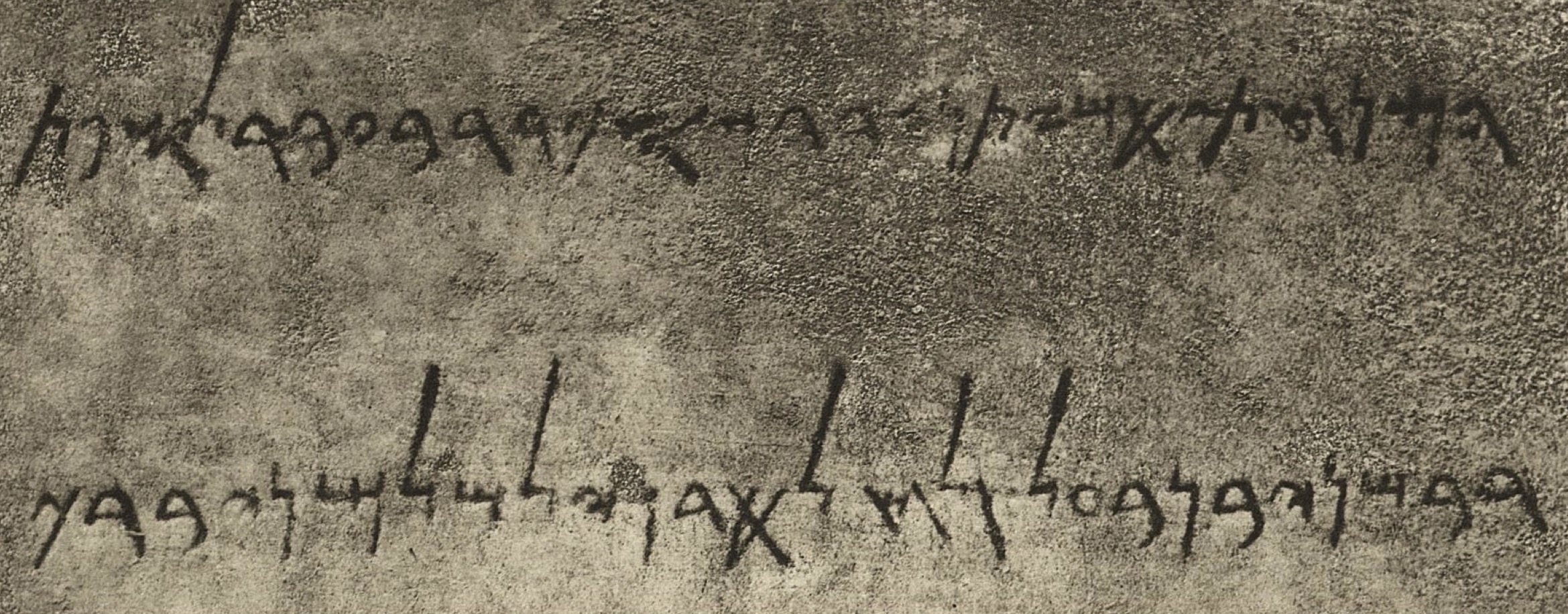
The inscription

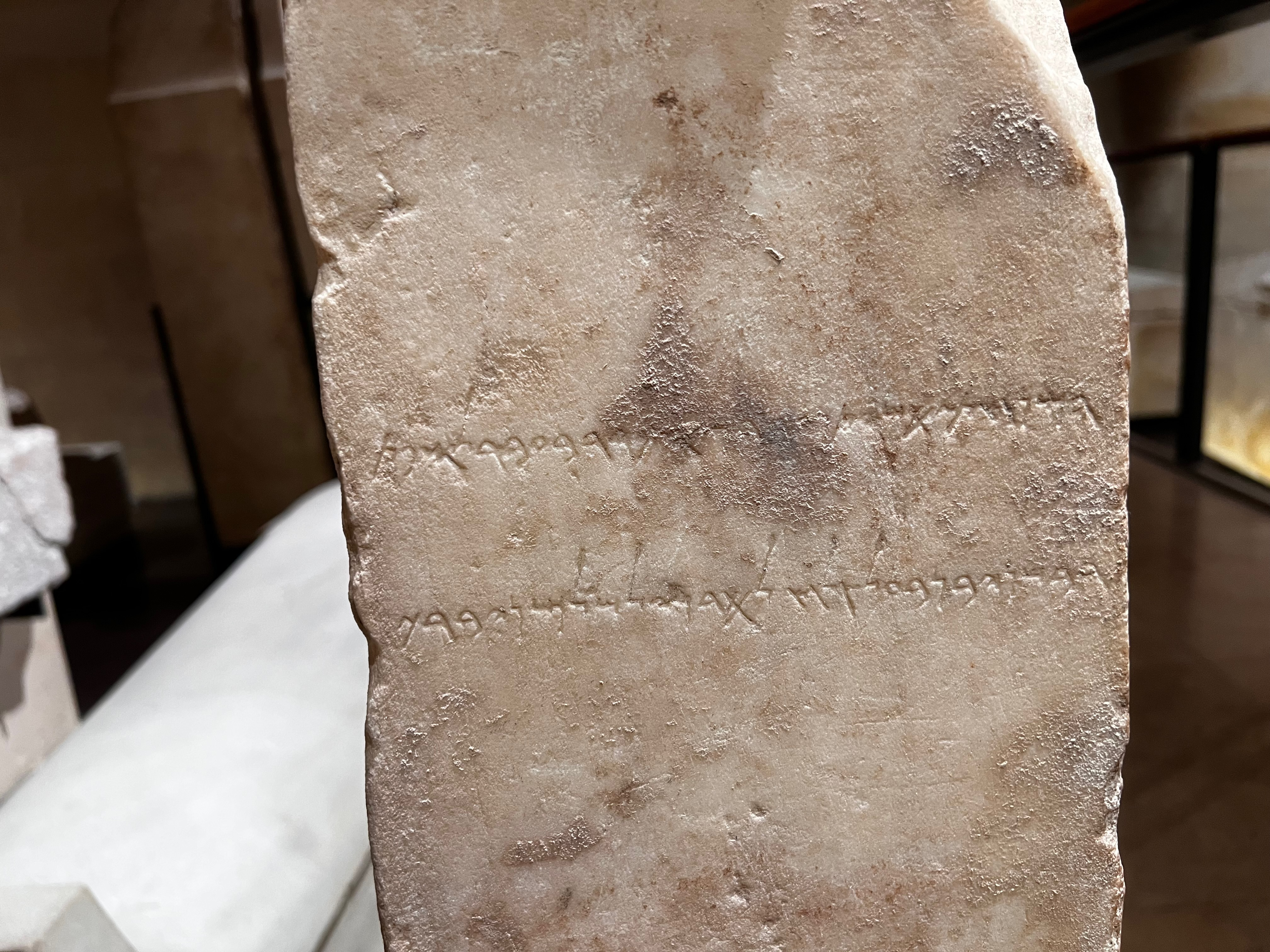
The inscription

== Bibliography ==
- Clermont-Ganneau Charles. Le cippe phénicien du Rab Abdmiskar. In: Comptes rendus des séances de l'Académie des Inscriptions et Belles-Lettres, 42^{e} année, N. 3, 1898. pp. 403–408. DOI : https://doi.org/10.3406/crai.1898.71201
- Chatonnet, F. and Catherine Apicella. "Réflexions à propos de l'inscription d'Abdmiskar." (2008), Escapades au Levant, editor: C. Roche
- Renan, Ernest. "INSCRIPTION PHÉNICIENNE INÉDITE DE SIDON." Revue d'Assyriologie et d'archéologie Orientale 2, no. 3 (1891): 75–77. http://www.jstor.org/stable/23275681.
