= Kition Resheph pillars =

Phoenician inscriptions

The Kition Resheph pillars are two Phoenician inscriptions discovered in Cyprus at Kition in 1860. They are notable for mentioning three cities - Kition, Idalion and Tamassos.

They currently reside in the Louvre: AO 7090 (CIS I 10) and AO 4826 (CIS I 88).

The reference to Kition in the inscriptions was compared to a bilingual reference to the city in one of the earliest known Athenian Greek-Phoenician inscriptions (see here for image).

== AO 7090 (CIS I 10) ==
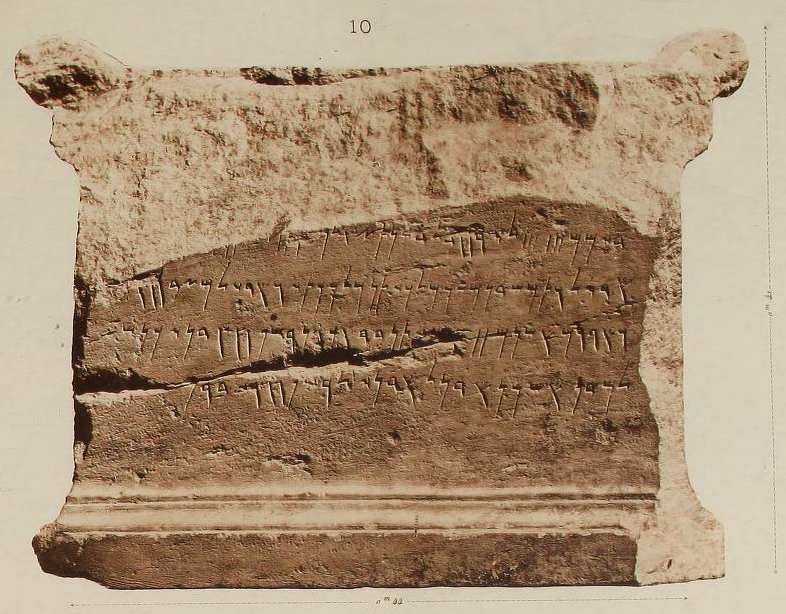
The Kition inscription in the Corpus Inscriptionum Semiticarum (CIS I 10)

Four line Phoenician inscription on a marble block, found in autumn 1861 in Kition (today, part of Larnaca), and obtained by Demetrios Pierides. The inscription mentions its date as year 21 of Pymiaton, the last king of Kition, i.e. in 336/7. The inscription is dedicated to Canaanite god Resheph. The inscription is as follows:

1. On the sixteenth day of the month of Bul, the year 21 of the reign of Pumayyaton, king of Citium,
2. Idalion and Temessus, son of king Milkyaton, king of Citium and Idalion. This altar
3. and two altar hearths are what was offered by bd', the priest of Resheph-of-the-arrow (ršp ḥṣ), the son of Yakon-
4. shalom, of the son of Eshmunadon, to his lord Resheph-of-the-arrow. May he bless (him)!

== AO 4826 (CIS I 88) ==
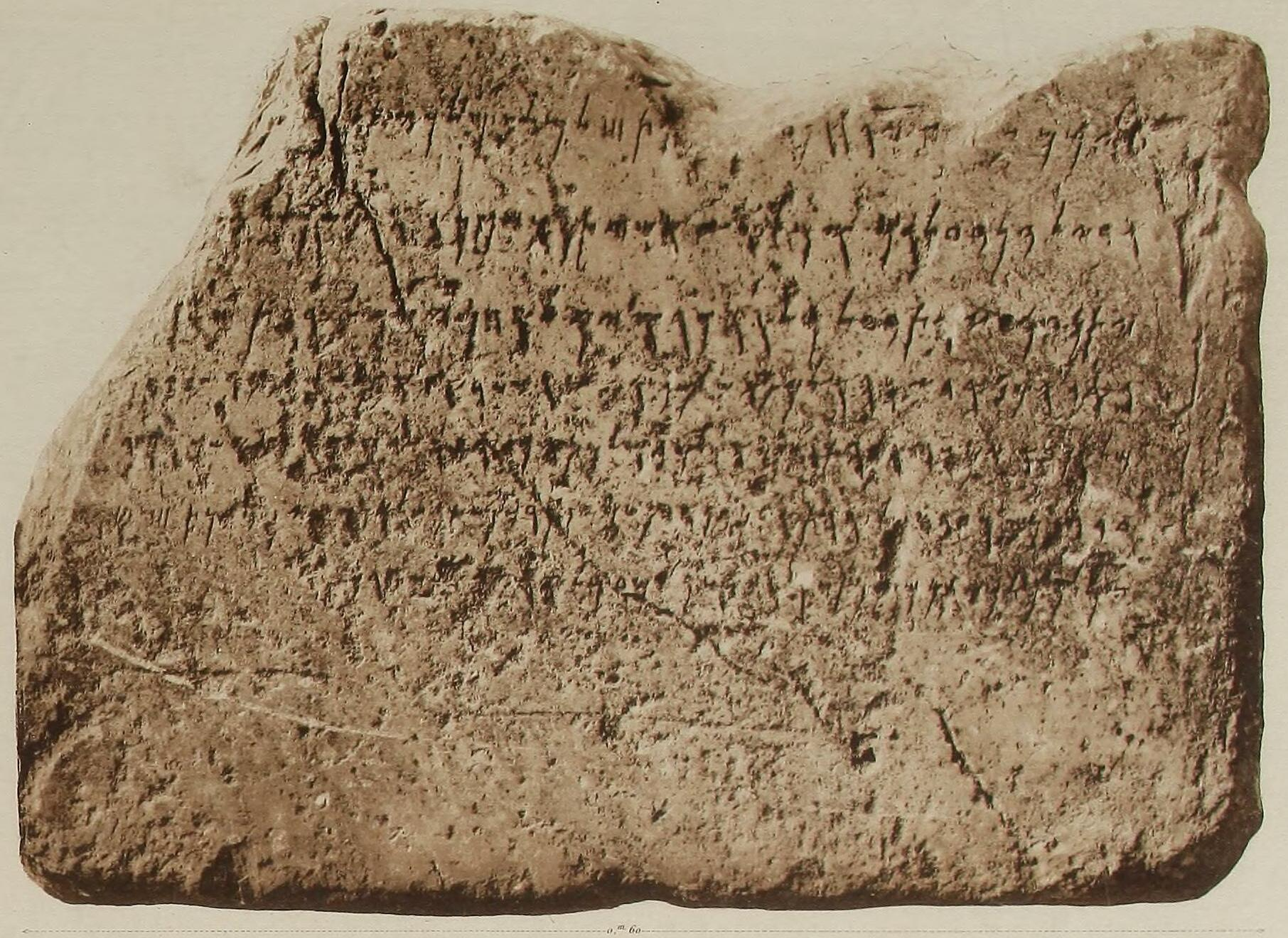
The Idalion Inscription in the Corpus Inscriptionum Semiticarum (CIS I 88)

Seven line Phoenician inscription on a marble block, thought to have served as the base for a statue, as the upper face includes the holes which may have held the clamps for the feet of a statue.

The provenance is unknown, and has been variously given as Idalion and Kition. It was found in 1860 in its secondary use in a mosque in Nicosia (20 km north of ancient Idalion), however Melchior de Vogüé wrote that "it had been brought from Larnaca" (where ancient Kition is located).

The inscription mentions its date as year 6 of the reign of Milkyaton, king of Citium and Idalium, which is the year 387. The inscription is as follows:

1. On the sixth day of the month of Pa..., the year 3 of the reign of Milkyaton, king of Citium and
2. Idalion, son of Baalrom. This is the statue offered and erected 'and' (by) [… Rashap-]
3. -yaton son of Izratiba'al, the royal interpreter, to his lord Melqart, (since) he he[ard (his) voice]…
4. Fulfilled this vow and fulfilled the intentions expressed in this vow by [… son of Rashap-yaton]
5. the royal interpreter… commissioned... and ... statues on the steps... commissioned...
6. Abd-Pummay and Abd-Melqart, two sons of Adoni-shemesh, of the son of Rashap-yaton, the [ro]yal interpreter, in the year 6
7. of the reign of Milkyaton, king of Citium and Idalion, since Melqart heard their voice. May he bless them.

It was discovered by Crusader historian Emmanuel Guillaume-Rey in Nicosia, where it had been brought from Larnaca and served as a mount at the door of the qadi. Guillaume-Rey had deposited at the French consulate, who sent it to the Louvre.

== Bibliography ==
- de Vogüé, Melchior (1862). "FOUILLES DE CHYPRE ET DE SYRIE Extrait d'une Lettre de M. Melchior de Vogùé à M. Renan". Revue archéologique (in French). 6. Press Univ. de France: 244–252. JSTOR 41746929.
- Ewald, Heinrich (1862a). "Entzifferung der neuentdeckten Phönitisch-Kyprischen Inschriften [Deciphering of the newly discovered Phoenitic-Cypriot inscriptions]". Nachrichten von der Georg-Augusts-Universität und der Königl. Gesellschaft der Wissenschaften zu Göttingen: 1862 (in German). Vandenhoeck & Ruprecht: 457.
- Ewald, Heinrich (1862b). "Nachtrag zu der Entzifferung der neuentdeckten Phönitisch-Kyprischen Inschriften [Addendum to the decipherment of the newly discovered Phoenitic-Cypriot inscriptions]". Nachrichten von der Georg-Augusts-Universität und der Königl. Gesellschaft der Wissenschaften zu Göttingen: 1862 (in German). Vandenhoeck & Ruprecht: 543.
- Vaux, William Sandys Wright (1863). "Extracts from letters addressed to C.T. Newton, Esq., by M. Demetrius Pierides and F. Calvert, Esq". Transactions of the Royal Society of Literature of the United Kingdom. 2nd series, VII. J. Murray: 394‑398.
- Levy, M.A. (1864). "I. Neue cyprische Inschriften". Phönizische Studien (in German). Vol. 3. Verlag von F.E.C. Leuckart. p. 1.
- de Vogüé, Melchior (1867). "Inscriptions phéniciennes de l'île de Chypre". Journal Asiatique (in French). Société asiatique: 85–176.
- Derenbourg, Joseph (1867). "Les nouvelles inscriptions de Cypre, trouvées par M. de Vogûé". Journal Asiatique (in French). Société asiatique: 479–502.
- de Vogüé, Melchior (1867b). "Sur les inscriptions phéniciennes appartenant à l'île de Chypre". Comptes rendus des séances de l'Académie des Inscriptions et Belles-Lettres (in French). 11 (1): 114–120. doi:10.3406/crai.1867.67304.
- Caquot, André; Masson, Olivier (1968). "Deux inscriptions phéniciennes de Chypre". Syria. Archéologie, Art et histoire (in French). 45 (3): 295–321. doi:10.3406/syria.1968.6016.
- Münnich, M.M. (2013). The God Resheph in the Ancient Near East. Orientalische Religionen in der Antike : Ägypten, Israel, Alter Orient. Mohr Siebeck. ISBN 978-3-16-152491-2.
