= Mdina steles =

Phoenician inscriptions found in Malta

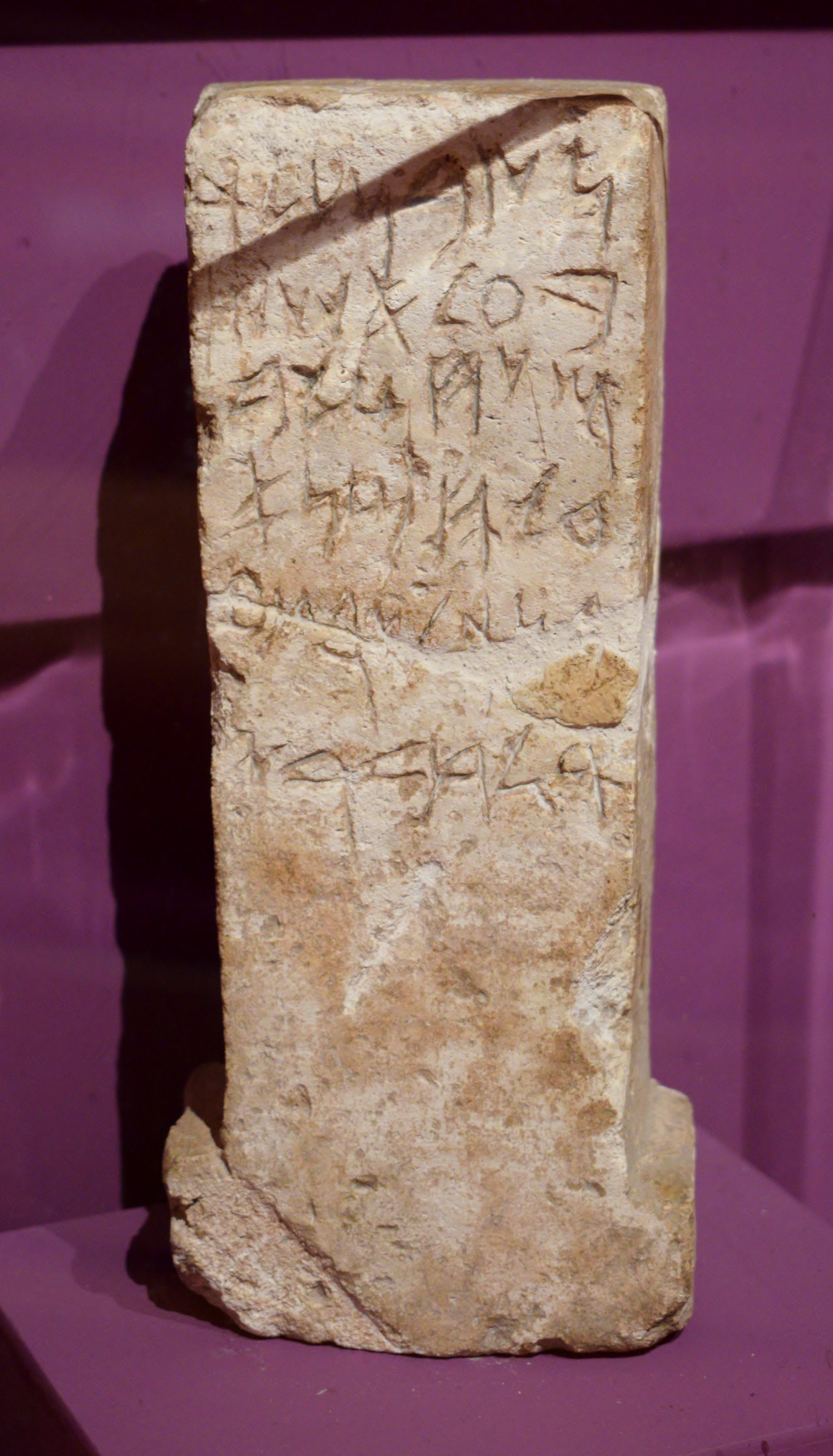
- The surviving stele (61A)
- Created: 6th century BC
- Discovered: 1816; Northern Region, Malta
- Present location: Valletta, South Eastern Region, Malta

The Mdina steles are two Phoenician language inscriptions found near the city of Mdina (ancient Maleth), Malta, in 1816. The findspot is disputed; the oldest known description places it near the Tal-Virtù Church. The surviving stele is currently in the National Museum of Archaeology, Malta; the other stele has been considered lost for more than a century.

They were widely publicized by Wilhelm Gesenius as Melitensia Tertia and Melitensia Quarta ("Maltese 3rd" and "Maltese 4th"). They are also known as KAI 61A,B or CIS i 123A,B.

Stele 61B has been dated to the sixth century BCE on the basis of letter forms.

== Text of the inscriptions ==
The two inscriptions read:

(A, lines 1-6)	NṢB MLK / B‘L ’Š Š/M NḤM LB/‘L-ḤMN ’/DN K ŠM‘ / QL DBRY	(This is) a stele (commemorating) a molk-Ba‘al (or molkomor?) that Naḥḥum presented to Baal-ḥammon, his Lord, because he has heard the sound of his word(s) (i.e., Ba‘al had answered Naḥḥum's prayers).
(B, lines 1-6)	NṢB MLK / ’MR ’Š Š/[M ’R]Š LB/‘L-[ḤMN] ’DN [K Š]M‘ / QL [DB]RY	(This is) a stele (commemorating) a «molkomor» that ’Aris presented to Baal-ḥammon, his Lord, because he has heard the sound of his word(s).

A "molkomor" (as in B) was a "substitute" sacrificial offering to Ba‘al of a lamb instead of a child. The word is a composite of molk or Moloch, traditionally the Punic god Ba‘al but more probably meaning "(human) sacrifice (of a child)", and ’MR (cf. Hebrew ’immēr), "lamb". Another possible reading is "MLK’SR", meaning Moloch-Osiris, who was also worshiped by the Phoenicians.

It is not clear whether molk-Ba‘al in A is a variant of molkomor, or that 61A refers to a real child sacrifice, while 61B refers to a substitute offering.

== Gallery ==
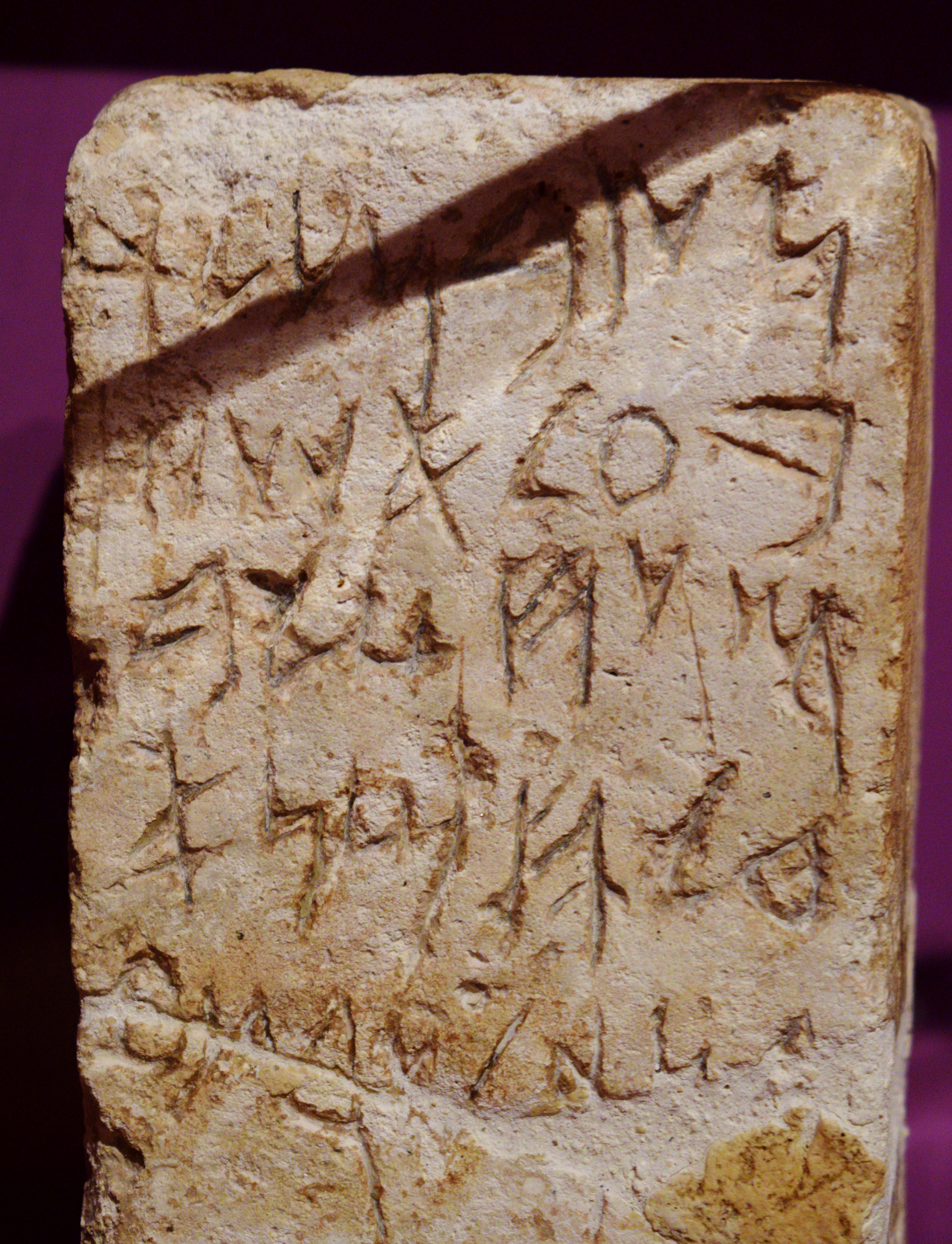
Close up of the surviving stele

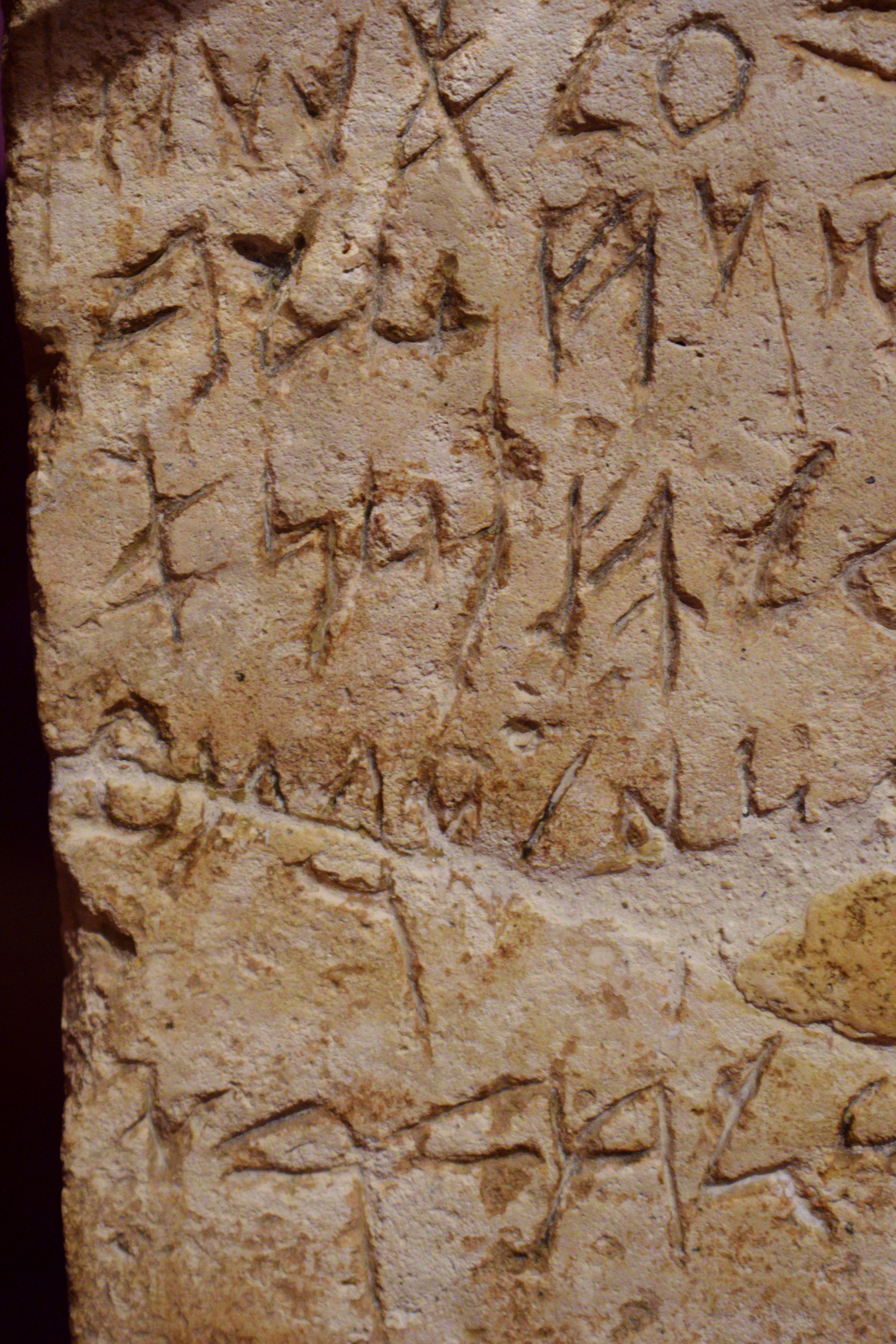
Close up of the surviving stele

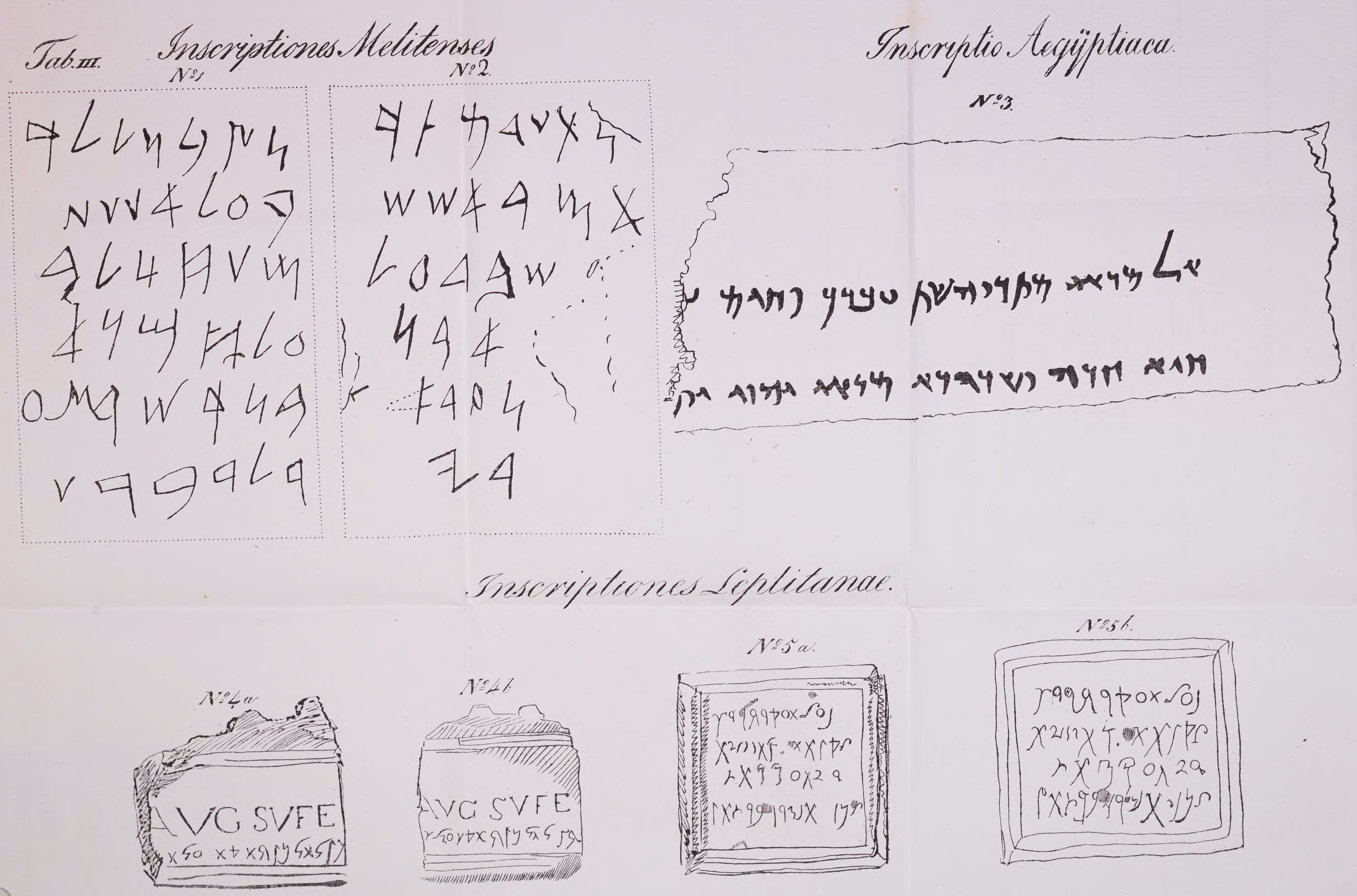
The inscriptions in Hamaker's 1828 Miscellanea Phoenicia

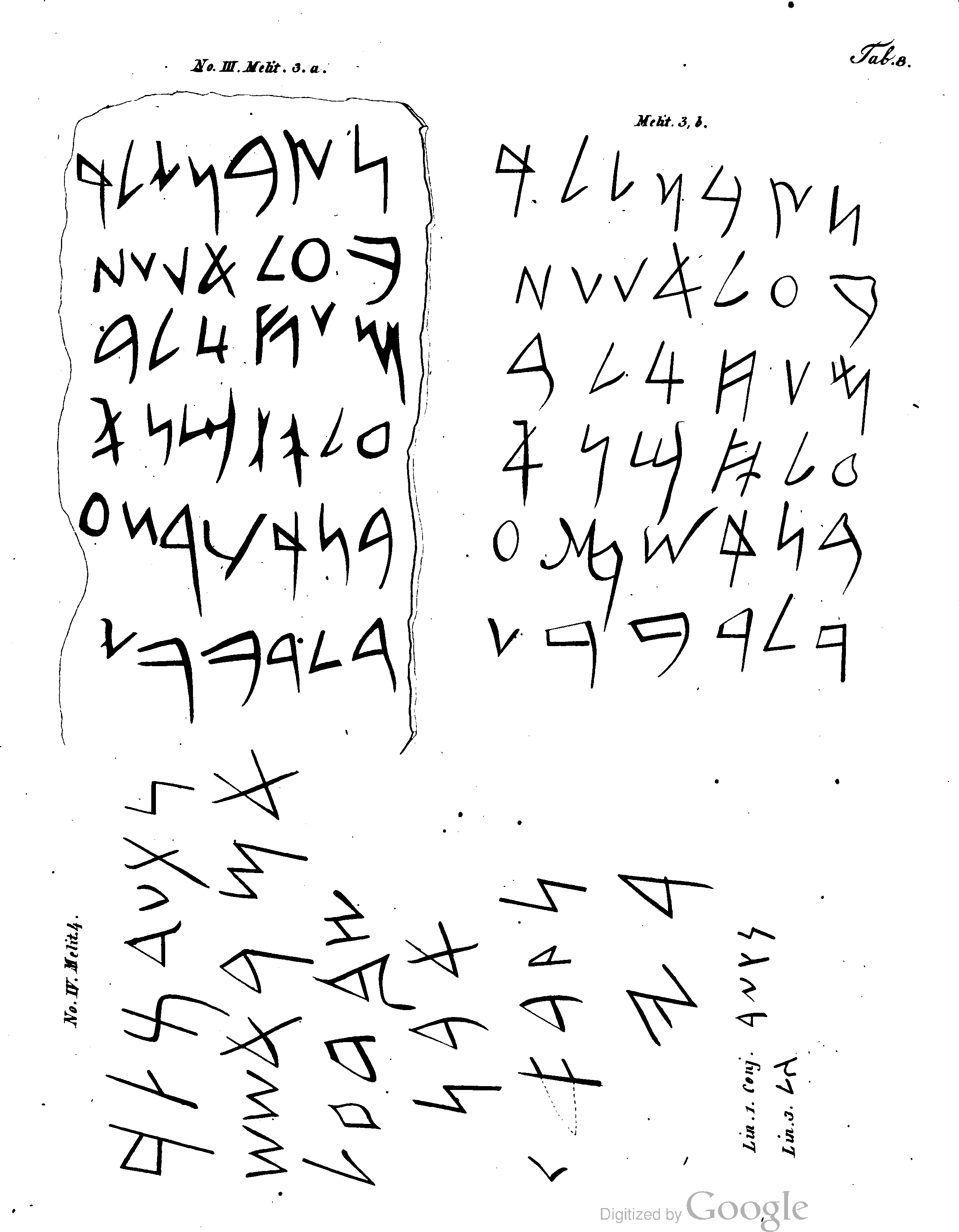
Two versions of Melitensia Tertia and of Melitensia Quarta, in Gesenius's 1837 Scripturae Linguaeque Phoeniciae Monumenta
