= Philippe Berger =

French politician and professor

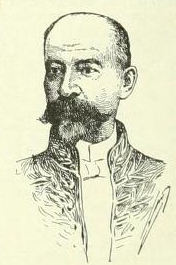
Philippe Berger

Philippe Berger, born on September 15, 1846, in Beaucourt (Haut-Rhin, currently in the Territoire de Belfort) and died on March 24, 1912, in Paris, was a French orientalist, professor and politician. He was a senator from 1904 to 1912.

== Biography ==
=== Education ===
Philippe Berger grew up in Paris, where he attended the Lycée Saint-Louis and the Lycée Louis-le-Grand. In 1867, he entered the Faculté de théologie protestante de Strasbourg, met Ernest Renan and began learning Hebrew.

Engaged in the health service of the Loire Army during the Franco-Prussian War of 1870, he was awarded the military medal for his conduct during the siege of Paris.

=== Academia ===
In 1873, he supported a thesis of theology at the Faculty of Montauban, entitled Études des documents nouveaux fournis sur les Ophites par les «Philosophouména» (Studies of new documents provided on the Ophites by the "Philosophouména"), which caught Renan's attention. Thanks to him, he was appointed chief librarian of the Institut de France (1874). Becoming Renan's secretary, he worked with him on the publication of the Corpus inscriptionum semiticarum (in particular on articles dealing with Phoenicia) and was appointed professor of Hebrew at the Faculté de théologie protestante de Paris in 1877.

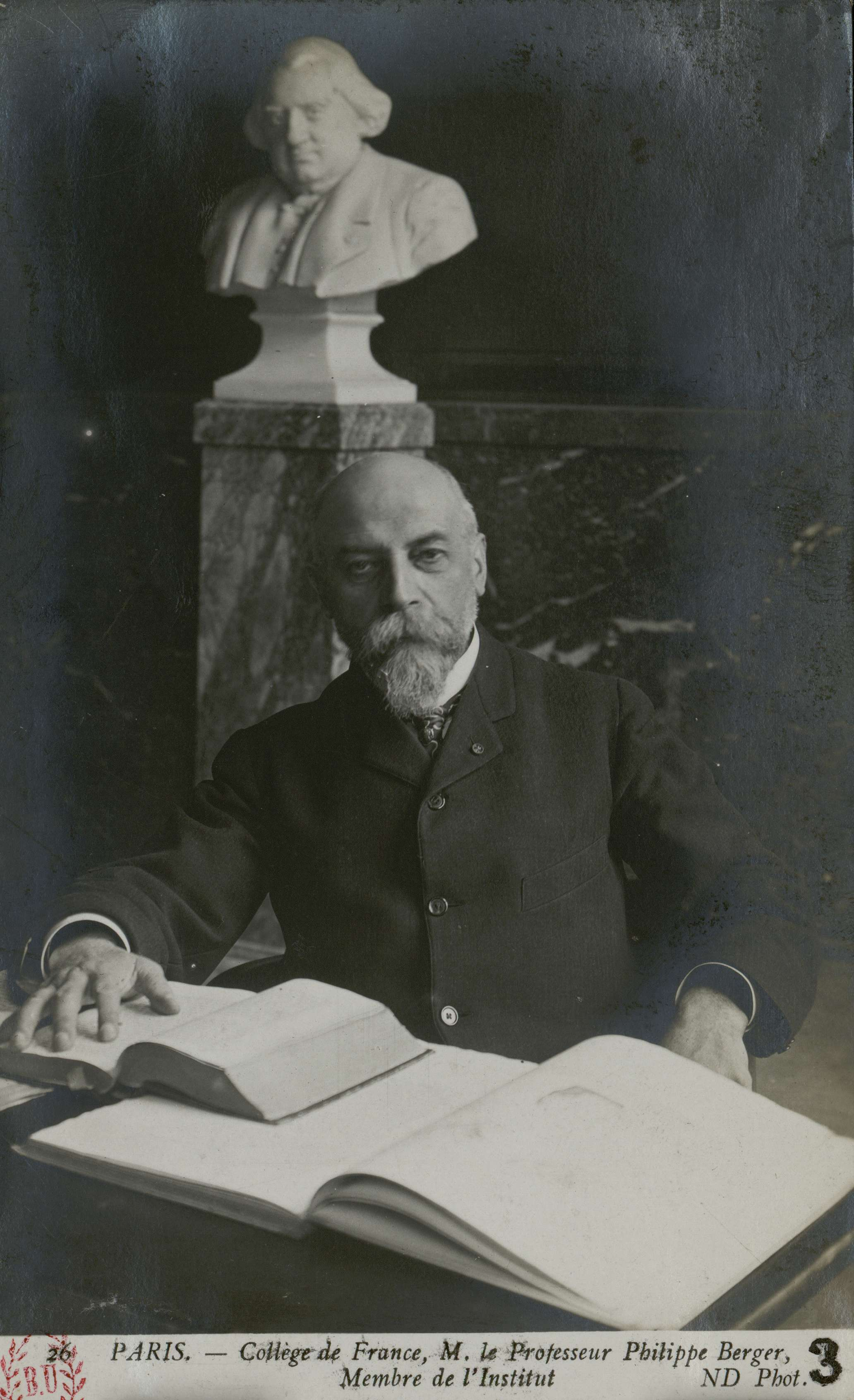
At the Collège de France, member of the Institute (Bibliothèque de la Sorbonne, NuBIS)

In 1892, Berger joined the Académie des inscriptions et belles-lettres in place of Ernest Renan. The following year, he succeeded his master at the Collège de France, where he held the chair of Hebrew until 1910.

=== Politics ===
Philippe Berger entered politics in 1895, when he was elected general councillor of the canton of Giromagny (Territory of Belfort). Becoming President of the General Council, he won the by- Senate election of the Territory of Belfort in 1904, succeeding Frédéric Japy. He was re-elected without opposition in 1909.

In the Senate, Philippe Berger sat with the democratic left group and participated in several commissions. He died in office.

== Family ==
Coming from a family from Switzerland, settled in Montbéliard since 1660, he was the 3rd son of Eugène Berger, a Protestant pastor, and Louise Caroline Mathilde Pitois (sister of Éléonore, wife of Oscar Berger-Levrault). He had four brothers and a sister:

- Samuel Berger (1843-1901), pastor
- Paul Berger (1845-1908), surgeon
- Théodore Berger (1848-1900), banker
- Élie Berger (1850-1925), archivist-paleographer
- Marie Berger (1858-1915), married to Edmond Berger-Levrault (son of Oscar Berger-Levrault)

== Bibliography ==
- François Laplanche, « Philippe Berger », in Patrick Cabanel et André Encrevé (dir.), Dictionnaire biographique des protestants français de 1787 à nos jours, tome 1 : A-C, Les Éditions de Paris Max Chaleil, Paris, 2015, p. 248-249 ISBN 978-2846211901
- « Philippe Berger », dans le Dictionnaire des parlementaires français (1889-1940), sous la direction de Jean Jolly, PUF, 1960 [détail de l’édition]
