= Phoenician Harpocrates statues =

Two copper statues with Phoenician inscriptions

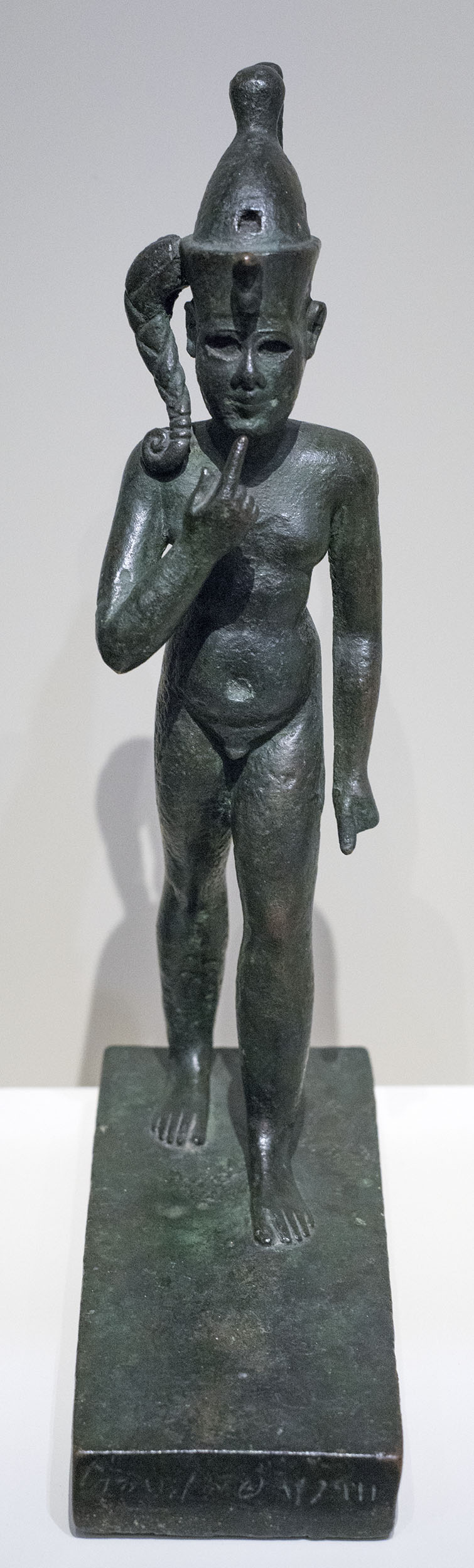
The Madrid statue

The Phoenician Harpocrates statues are two copper alloy statues of the Greco-Egyptian god Harpocrates, with Phoenician inscriptions on their bases. The first statue was found in Madrid in the 18th century and is today in the National Archaeological Museum (Madrid) and the second was acquired by the British Museum in 1960 (BM 132908).

The inscriptions are known as KAI 52, and feature in Gibson's Textbook of Syrian Semitic Inscriptions as III 37 and 38.

== Madrid National Archaeological Museum ==
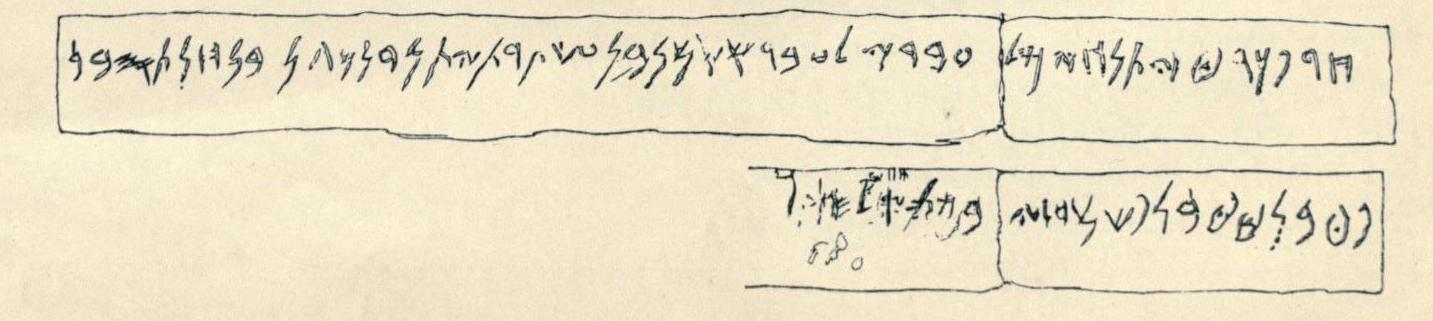
The inscription on the Madrid statue

The Madrid statue was first recorded in the 1767 Catalogue systématique et raisonné des curiosités de la nature et de l'art qui composent le Cabinet de M. Dávila (The systematic and reasoned catalog of the curiosities of nature and art that make up the Cabinet of M. Dávila), a detailed catalogue of the well known collector Pedro Franco Dávila. The catalogue described the statue as follows, without identifying the characters:

Harpocrates with the finger on the mouth, & his hair horn on the right ear. He is standing on a protruding plinth, on the sides of which are characters. The Figure is antique & the varnish modern: height ten and a half inches.

The statue was not assessed by scholars until almost a century later when it was identified as Phoenician by Emil Hübner in his 1862 review of the ancient sculptures in Madrid. It was then published in detail by Heinrich Ewald in 1875.

== British Museum ==
11 inch high bronze statuette, with the whites of the eyes inlaid with gold leaf. The bilingual Egyptian and Phoenician inscription do not completely correspond:

- Egyptian: May Harpocrates grant life to Us-ankh, son of Pet-hy ...
- Phoenician: May Harpocrates grant life to Amos, son of Eshmunyaton, son of Azarmilk ..... .. ...

The statue may come from a shrine of Harpocrates in Egypt, "perhaps from the same source as a similar Harpocrates figure with a Phoenician inscription now in Madrid."

Date to the fourth century BCE.

== Bibliography ==
- Levy, M.A. (1870). Phönizische Studien (in German). Vol. 4. Leuckart.
