= Hor son of Punesh =

Ancient Egyptian magician

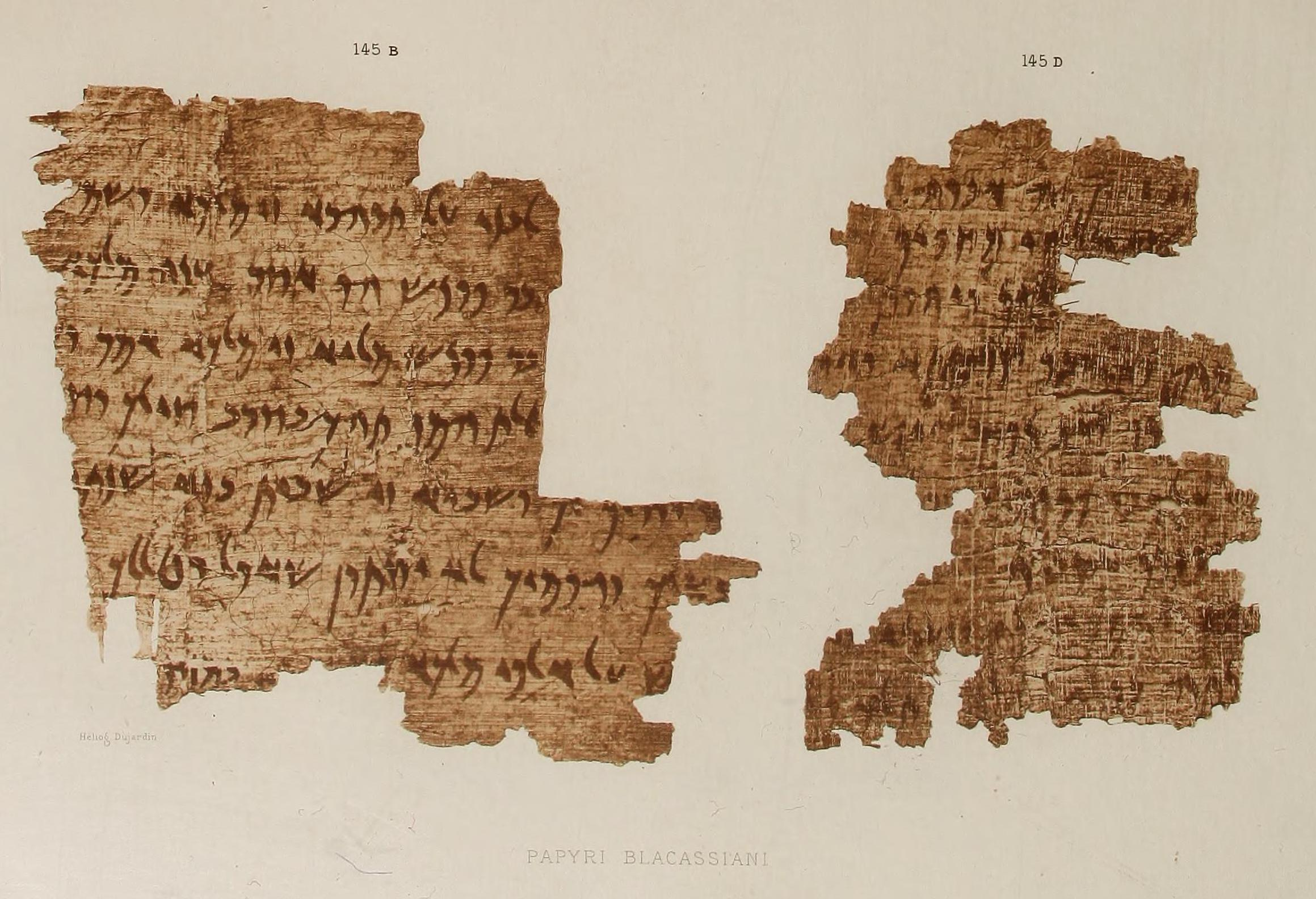
5th-century BC Aramaic papyrus fragments containing part of the story fo Hor son of Punesh

Hor son of Punesh (or Pwenesh) is a magician from ancient Egyptian literature.

== Sources ==
Hor is named in the fragmentary Blacas papyrus from the third quarter of the 5th century BC, discovered at Saqqara and now in London. This text is in Imperial Aramaic. The name of Hor has been read as ḥr-pa-pꜣ-wnš, but there is some uncertainty regarding ḥr. The patronymic 'Bar Punesh' is clear. It can also be translated "son of the wolf". Hor is mentioned on only one side of the papyrus and it is unclear if the text on the other side belongs to the same story.

Hor (or Horus) is also named in fifteen Demotic Egyptian papyrus fragments by at least three different scribes, all now kept in Berlin. They have not been published, but described by Karl-Theodor Zauzich. He may be the same figure as Horus son of Paneshe named in the Demotic tale Setne Khamwas and Si-Osire, preserved on a papyrus from the 1st century BC, probably of Crocodilopolis, now in London.

== Tales ==
The fragmentary Aramaic story of Bar Punesh has been transcribed and translated into English by Arthur Ernest Cowley. In the Aramaic version, Bar Punesh is a magician who announces a coming disaster. This seems to be a response to the murder of his sons by a king, who, given the fragmentary nature of the text, could be either the king of Egypt or another. The adventures of magicians are a common topic in ancient Egyptian literature.

In Cowley's summation, Bar Punesh "had done some meritorious service for which he was suitably rewarded by the king". Terence Mitchell, too, sees him as having "a meeting with the Pharaoh". The edition of Bezalel Porten and Ada Yardeni agrees, having Bar Punesh put "over the host of kings, and set him among the officers". That the adversary of Bar Punesh was a foreign king is made clear by the Demotic texts.

The Demotic fragments show Hor son of Punesh as one of the priests of Ra at Heliopolis. His stories belong to a cycle separate from those of the High Priests of Ptah at Memphis. His chief adversary is the king of Meroë. His methods of spellcasting involve the Book of Thoth and waxen figures. In Setne Khamwas and Si-Osire, he protects the Pharaoh Ramesses II from some Meroite sorcerers.

Although his oldest attestation is in an Aramaic document, Hor son of Punesh must be an Egyptian literary creation. The translation and adaptation of his story into Aramaic, a lingua franca used as far east as India, demonstrate that Demotic literature was not limited in readership to a tiny elite.

== Bibliography ==
- Cowley, Arthur Ernest, ed. (1923). Aramaic Papyri of the Fifth Century B.C.: Edited with Translations and Notes. Clarendon Press.
- Gianto, Agustinus (1995). "A New Edition of Aramaic Texts from Egypt (Ahiqar, Bar Punesh, Bisitun, Accounts and Lists)". Biblica. 76 (1): 85–92. JSTOR 42611440.
- Love, Edward (2020). "The Literary vs The Literal: The Narration of Magical Practices, Texts, and Their Practitioners in Setne I and II Compared with the So-Called Demotic and Greek Magical Papyri". In Franziska Naether (ed.). Cult Practices in Ancient Literatures: Egyptian, Near Eastern and Graeco-Roman Narratives in a Cross-Cultural Perspective. Proceedings of a Workshop at the Institute for the Study of the Ancient World, New York, May 16–17, 2016.
- Mitchell, T. C. (2004). The Bible in the British Museum: Interpreting the Evidence. Paulist Press.
- Porten, Bezalel; Yardeni, Ada, eds. (1993). Textbook of Aramaic Documents from Ancient Egypt. Vol. 3: Literature, Accounts, Lists. Eisenbrauns.
- Porten, Bezalel (2004). "The Prophecy of Hor bar Punesh and the Demise of Righteousness: An Aramaic Papyrus in the British Museum". In F. Hoffmann; H. J. Thissen (eds.). Res severa verum gaudium: Festschrift für Karl-Theodor Zauzich zum 65. Geburtstag am 8. Juni 2004. Peeters. pp. 427–466.
- Quack, Joachim Friedrich (2011). "The Interaction of Egyptian and Aramaic Literature". In Oded Lipschits; Gary N. Knoppers; Manfred Oeming (eds.). Judah and the Judeans in the Achaemenid Period (PDF). Penn State University Press. pp. 375–401. doi:10.1515/9781575066493-017. ISBN 978-1-57506-649-3.
- Zauzich, Karl-Theodor (1978). "Neue literarische Texte in demotischer Schrift". Enchoria. 8: 33–38.
