= Textbook of Aramaic Documents from Ancient Egypt =

Four-volume book by Porten and Yardeni

The Textbook of Aramaic Documents from Ancient Egypt, often referred to as TAD or TADAE, is a four volume corpus of Aramaic inscriptions written in Egypt during the Ancient Egyptian period, written by Bezalel Porten and Ada Yardeni.

Originally envisaged to be the Corpus Papyrorum Aramaicarum, following the Corpus Papyrorum Judaicarum, it grew to incorporate all Aramaic inscriptions from the region, not just on papyrus, so the title was changed – this time borrowing from J. C. L. Gibson's 1971 Textbook of Syrian Semitic Inscriptions.

Each of volumes 1-3 contains 40-50 texts (vol. 1 letters (A); vol. 2 contracts (B); vol. 3 literary texts (C)), and volume 4 contains 478 texts, including D1-5: 216 papyrus fragments; D6: 14 leather; D7-10: 87 ostraca. The collection does not include the Saqqarah papyri (Note: Discovered from 1966-73, the group consists of 202 papyrus fragments and 5 ostraca; none of these are full or almost full texts: Pardee writes “As a matter of connected text, however, this collection is much less important than the groups of texts published by Sayce, Sachau, Cowley, Driver, Kraeling, and Bresciani and Kamil, for there is not a single complete document among these 202 papyri.”) and most of the Clermont-Ganneau ostraca. (Note: Discovered in the early 20th century, but very few have been published.)

It is the standard reference textbook for the Aramaic Elephantine papyri and ostraca, as well as other examples of Egyptian Aramaic, which together provide the primary extant examples of Imperial Aramaic worldwide.

== Concordance ==
Name		Discovered	Date	Location	TAD	Cowley (C)	Grelot	Other ref	Museum number
Adon Papyrus		1942	600s BCE		A1.1			KAI 266	
Hermopolis Aramaic papyri		1945	400-500 BCE	University of Cairo	A2.1		28	Bresciani-Kamil 4	
Hermopolis Aramaic papyri		1945	400-500 BCE	University of Cairo	A2.2		26	Bresciani-Kamil 2	
Hermopolis Aramaic papyri		1945	400-500 BCE	University of Cairo	A2.3		25	Bresciani-Kamil 1	
Hermopolis Aramaic papyri		1945	400-500 BCE	University of Cairo	A2.4		27	Bresciani-Kamil 3	
Hermopolis Aramaic papyri		1945	400-500 BCE	University of Cairo	A2.5		29	Bresciani-Kamil 5	
Hermopolis Aramaic papyri		1945	400-500 BCE	University of Cairo	A2.6		30	Bresciani-Kamil 6	
Hermopolis Aramaic papyri		1945	400-500 BCE	University of Cairo	A2.7		31	Bresciani-Kamil 7	
Private Letters		1906-08	400-500 BCE	Egyptian Museum	A3.1	54	-	Sachau 39	Pap. No. 3456 = J. 43493
Private Letters		1906-08	400-500 BCE	Egyptian Museum	A3.2	55	-	Sachau 40	Pap. No. 3457 = J. 43494
Private Letters	Padua Aramaic papyri	1815-19 (published 1960)	400-500 BCE	Museo Civico di Padova	A3.3		14		Aramaic Papyrus 1
Private Letters	Padua Aramaic papyri	1815-19 (published 1960)	400-500 BCE	Museo Civico di Padova	A3.4				Aramaic Papyrus 2
Private Letters		1906-08	400-500 BCE	Egyptian Museum	A3.5	41	-	Sachau 13	Pap. No. 3437 = J. 43474
Private Letters		1906-08	400-500 BCE	Egyptian Museum	A3.6	40	16	Sachau 14	Pap. No. 3438 = J. 43475
Private Letters		1906-08	400-500 BCE	Egyptian Museum	A3.7	39	15	Sachau 12	Pap. No. 3436 = J. 43473
Private Letters		1906-08	400-500 BCE	Egyptian Museum	A3.8	42	17	Sachau 16	Pap. No. 3440 = J. 43477
Private Letters	Wilbour Aramaic papyrus	1893	400-500 BCE	Brooklyn Museum	A3.9			Kraeling 13	Brooklyn Museum 47.218.151
Private Letters		1970	400-500 BCE	Egyptian Museum of Berlin	A3.10				P. Berlin 23000
Private Letters		1959	400-500 BCE	Museo Archeologico di Firenze	A3.11				Inv. n. 11913
Jedaniah Communal Archive	Passover Letter	1906-08	419 - 407 BCE	Egyptian Museum of Berlin	A4.1	21	96	Sachau 6	P. 13464
Jedaniah Communal Archive		1906-08	419 - 407 BCE	Egyptian Museum	A4.2	37	97	Sachau 10	Pap. No. 3434 = J. 43471
Jedaniah Communal Archive		1906-08	419 - 407 BCE	Egyptian Museum	A4.3	38	98	Sachau 11	Pap. No. 3435 = J. 43472
Jedaniah Communal Archive		1906-08	419 - 407 BCE	Egyptian Museum of Berlin and Egyptian Museum of Cairo	A4.4	56+34	100	Sachau 15	Berlin P. 13456 + Pap. No. 3439 = J. 43476
Jedaniah Communal Archive	Strasbourg Aramaic papyrus	1898	419 - 407 BCE	Bibliothèque Nationale et Universitaire (Strasbourg)	A4.5	27	101		Aram. 2
Jedaniah Communal Archive		1906-08	419 - 407 BCE	Egyptian Museum of Berlin	A4.6	66			P. 13445
Jedaniah Communal Archive	Temple Reconstruction Letter	1906-08	419 - 407 BCE	Egyptian Museum of Berlin	A4.7	30	102	Sachau 1	P. 13495
Jedaniah Communal Archive		1906-08	419 - 407 BCE	Egyptian Museum	A4.8	31	102	Sachau 2	Pap. No. 3428 = J. 43465
Jedaniah Communal Archive		1906-08	419 - 407 BCE	Egyptian Museum of Berlin	A4.9	32	103	Sachau 3	P. 13497
Jedaniah Communal Archive		1906-08	419 - 407 BCE	Egyptian Museum	A4.10	33	104	Sachau 5	Pap. No. 3430 = J. 43467
Official (semi-official) Letters	Maspero Saqqara Aramaic papyrus	1902	436 - 300s BCE	Académie des Inscriptions	A5.1				Inscriptions 5-7
Official (semi-official) Letters		1906-08	436 - 300s BCE	Egyptian Museum	A5.2	16	18	Sachau 7	Pap. No 3431 = J. 43468
Official (semi-official) Letters	Turin Aramaic Papyrus	1824	436 - 300s BCE	Musco Egizio di Torino	A5.3	70		CIS II 144	Prov. 645
Official (semi-official) Letters	Memphis Serapeum Aramaic papyrus	1862	436 - 300s BCE	Egyptian Museum	A5.4	76		CIS II 151	Pap. No. 3654 = J. 59204
Official (semi-official) Letters	Maspero Elephantine Aramaic papyrus	1902	436 - 300s BCE		A5.5	80		RES 248	Académie des Inscriptions 2-4
The Letters of Arsames and his Colleagues		1906-08	427 - 400 BCE	Egyptian Museum	A6.1	17	60	Sachau 4	Pap. No. 3429 = J. 43466
The Letters of Arsames and his Colleagues		1906-08	427 - 400 BCE	Egyptian Museum	A6.2	26	61	Sachau 8	Pap. No. 3432 = J. 43469
The Letters of Arsames and his Colleagues		1933 (published 1954)	427 - 400 BCE	Bodleian Library	A6.3		64	Driver 3 + Frag 7.1	Pell. Aram. VII
The Letters of Arsames and his Colleagues		1933 (published 1954)	427 - 400 BCE	Bodleian Library	A6.4		62	Driver 2 + Frag 9.6	Pell. Aram. IV (bottom left) + XII
The Letters of Arsames and his Colleagues		1933 (published 1954)	427 - 400 BCE	Bodleian Library	A6.5		63	Driver 1 and 1a	Pell. Aram. VI
The Letters of Arsames and his Colleagues		1933 (published 1954)	427 - 400 BCE	Bodleian Library	A6.6			Driver Frag. 5	
The Letters of Arsames and his Colleagues		1933 (published 1954)	427 - 400 BCE	Bodleian Library	A6.7		66	Driver 5	Pell. Aram. IV
The Letters of Arsames and his Colleagues		1933 (published 1954)	427 - 400 BCE	Bodleian Library	A6.8		65	Driver 4	Pell. Aram. II
The Letters of Arsames and his Colleagues		1933 (published 1954)	427 - 400 BCE	Bodleian Library	A6.9		67	Driver 6	Pell. Aram. VIII
The Letters of Arsames and his Colleagues		1933 (published 1954)	427 - 400 BCE	Bodleian Library	A6.10		68	Driver 7	Pell. Aram. I
The Letters of Arsames and his Colleagues		1933 (published 1954)	427 - 400 BCE	Bodleian Library	A6.11		69	Driver 8	Pell. Aram. XIII
The Letters of Arsames and his Colleagues		1933 (published 1954)	427 - 400 BCE	Bodleian Library	A6.12		70	Driver 9	Pell. Aram. III
The Letters of Arsames and his Colleagues		1933 (published 1954)	427 - 400 BCE	Bodleian Library	A6.13		71	Driver 10	Pell. Aram. IX
The Letters of Arsames and his Colleagues		1933 (published 1954)	427 - 400 BCE	Bodleian Library	A6.14		72	Driver 11	Pell. Aram. V
The Letters of Arsames and his Colleagues		1933 (published 1954)	427 - 400 BCE	Bodleian Library	A6.15		73	Driver 12	Pell. Aram. XIV
The Letters of Arsames and his Colleagues		1933 (published 1954)	427 - 400 BCE	Bodleian Library	A6.16		74	Driver 13	Pell. Aram. X
Mibtahiah archive					B2.1	5	32	Sayce-Cowley A	
Mibtahiah archive					B2.2	6	33	Sayce-Cowley B	
Mibtahiah archive					B2.3	8	34	Sayce-Cowley D	
Mibtahiah archive					B2.4	9	35	Sayce-Cowley C	
Mibtahiah archive					B2.5	48	-	Sachau 38	
Mibtahiah archive					B2.6	15	38	Sayce-Cowley G	
Mibtahiah archive					B2.7	13	36	Sayce-Cowley E	
Mibtahiah archive			Quit Claim		B2.8	14	37	Sayce-Cowley F	
Mibtahiah archive					B2.9	20	39	Sayce-Cowley H	
Mibtahiah archive					B2.10	25	40	Sayce-Cowley J	
Mibtahiah archive					B2.11	28	41	Sayce-Cowley K	
Anani archive					B3.1	10	4	Sachau 28	
Anani archive	Mika cedes property to Anani b. Azariah			Brooklyn Museum	B3.2		42	Kraeling 1+18	
Anani archive	Anani b. Azariah marriage to Tamut			Brooklyn Museum	B3.3		43	Kraeling 2	
Anani archive	Bagazusht and Ubil sell house to Anani b. Azariah			Brooklyn Museum	B3.4		44	Kraeling 3	
Anani archive	Gift from man to wife			Brooklyn Museum	B3.5		45	Kraeling 4	
Anani archive	Emancipation of female slave			Brooklyn Museum	B3.6		46	Kraeling 5	
Anani archive	Father-daughter adjoining house			Brooklyn Museum	B3.7		47	Kraeling 6	
Anani archive	Ananiah son of Haggai marriage			Brooklyn Museum	B3.8		48	Kraeling 7+15	
Anani archive	Slave adoption			Brooklyn Museum	B3.9		49	Kraeling 8	
Anani archive	Father-daughter gift			Brooklyn Museum	B3.10		50	Kraeling 9	
Anani archive	Father-daughter house donation			Brooklyn Museum	B3.11		51	Kraeling 10	
Anani archive	Sale contract			Brooklyn Museum	B3.12		53	Kraeling 12	
Anani archive	Grain loan			Brooklyn Museum	B3.13		52	Kraeling 11	
					B4.1	49	1	Sachau 44	
					B4.2	11	3	Sayce-Cowley L	
					B4.3	3	-	Sachau 26	
					B4.4	2	54	Sachau 25	
					B4.5	29	6	Sachau 29	
					B4.6	35	7	Sachau 35	
					B5.1	1	2	Sachau 30	
					B5.2	65,3+67,3			
					B5.3				
					B5.4	47	-	Sachau 37	
					B5.5	43	8	Sachau 33	
					B6.1			Kraeling 14	
					B6.2	36	-	Sachau 9	
					B6.3	46	-	Sachau 31	
					B6.4	18	5	Sachau 34	
					B7.1	45	11	Sachau 36	
					B7.2	7	9	Sachau 27	
					B7.3	44	10	Sachau 32	
					B7.4	59		Sachau 47	
Lepsius Aramaic papyrus		1849			B8.5	69		CIS II 149	
Literary Texts	Story of Ahikar	1906-08		Egyptian Museum of Berlin and Egyptian Museum of Cairo	C1.1 (+3.7)			Sachau 49-52, 54-59	Berlin P. 13446A-H, K-L + Pap. No. 3465 = J. 43502
Literary Texts	Blacas papyri	1825		British Library	C1.2	71		CIS II 145	Pap. 106
Historical Texts	Behistun papyrus	1906-08		Egyptian Museum of Berlin	C2.1 (+3.13)			Sachau 61-62	P. 13447
Accounts		1880s (published 1915)		Egyptian Museum	C3.1			RÉS 1791	Pap. No. 3466 = J. 36499
Accounts	Göttingen papyrus	1884 (published 1974)		Göttingen State and University Library	C3.2				Cod.Ms.or.var.1,xx
Accounts		1906-08		Egyptian Museum	C3.3	52	-	Sachau 22	Pap. No. 3445 = J. 43482
Accounts		1906-07 (published 1974)		Egyptian Museum of Berlin	C3.4				P. Berlin 23103
Accounts		1917		Egyptian Museum	C3.5	p. 318		Aimé-Giron	Pap. No. 3656 = J. 59209
Accounts		1966-72 (published 1983)		Egyptian Antiquities Service	C3.6			Segal 47	Register No. 5881
Accounts	Ahigar erased text	1906-08		Egyptian Museum of Berlin and Egyptian Museum of Cairo	C3.7 (+1.1)			Sachau 49-52, 54-59	Berlin P. 13446A-H, K-L + Pap. No. 3465 = J. 43502
Accounts		1926		Egyptian Museum	C3.8			Aimé-Giron 5-20, 24, 39	Pap. No. 3470, 3471, 3472, 3474 J. 50053, 50054, 50055, 50057
Accounts		1906-07 (published 1988)		Egyptian Museum of Berlin	C3.9		105	Kraeling 13	P. Berlin 23128–32, 23134
Accounts	Bresciani papyrus	1940 (published 1971)		Egyptian Museum	C3.10				Pap. No. 3484 = J. 72527
Accounts		1966-72 (published 1983)		Egyptian Antiquities Service	C3.11			Segal 20+19	Register No. 2212 + 2195
Accounts	Louvre Aramaic papyrus	1826 (published 1863)		Louvre	C3.12	72		CIS II 146	AF 7991
Accounts	Memorandum from verso of the Behistun papyrus	1906-08		Egyptian Museum of Berlin	C3.13 (+2.1)	61–63, 64,21 + 68,5		Sachau 61-62	Berlin P. 13447 verso
Accounts		1906-08		Egyptian Museum	C3.14	24	55	Sachau 19	Pap. No. 3442 = J. 43479 + 43479A
Accounts		1906-08		Egyptian Museum of Berlin	C3.15	22	89	Sachau 18	P. 13488 + Nos. 64 and 76 of 96 Frags. + P. Berlin 23101
Accounts		1893 (published 1953)		Brooklyn Museum	C3.16		-	Kraeling 17	Brooklyn Museum 47.218.153
Accounts		unknown		Egyptian Museum	C3.17			Aimé-Giron 78+77	Pap. No. 3476 = J. 59202
Accounts		1966-72 (published 1983)		Egyptian Antiquities Service	C3.18			Segal 45	Register No. 2201
Accounts		1827 (published 1869)		Vatican Museum	C3.19	73		CIS II 147	Inv. No. 22955
Accounts		1966-72 (published 1983)		Egyptian Antiquities Service	C3.20			Segal 57	Register No. 2215
Accounts		1862 (published 1887)		Egyptian Museum	C3.21	75		CIS II 150	Pap. No. 3653 = J. 59203
Accounts		1966-72 (published 1983)		Egyptian Antiquities Service	C3.22			Segal 48	Register No. 1560
Accounts		1966-72 (published 1983)		Egyptian Antiquities Service	C3.23			Segal 87	Register No. 5891
Accounts		1966-72 (published 1983)		Egyptian Antiquities Service	C3.24			Segal 106	Register No. 5666
Accounts		1880s		Egyptian Museum	C3.25	78		CIS II 153	Pap. No. 3478 = J. 60144
Accounts		1924-25		Egyptian Museum	C3.26			Aimé-Giron 87	Pap. No. 3469 = J. 50052
Accounts	Harrow papyrus	1880s (published 1923)		Harrow School Museum	C3.27	83			
Accounts		1906		Bodleian Library	C3.28	81			MS. Heb. a. 5 (P)
Accounts		unknown		Museo dell'Istituto di Studi del Vicino Oriente, Università di Roma	C3.29				Pap. Levi Della Vida
Lists		1913		Egyptian Museum	C4.1	p. 317		Aimé-Giron	Pap. No. 3655 = J. 59208
Lists		1926		Egyptian Museum	C4.2			Aimé-Giron 46 + 50 + 25 + 47; 26, 30, 33, 61, 75	Pap. No. 3473, 3474 = J. 50056. 50057
Lists		1966-72 (published 1983)		Egyptian Antiquities Service	C4.3			Segal 53	Register No. 1558
Lists		1906-08		Egyptian Museum	C4.4	12	56	Sachau 17	Pap. No. 3441 = J. 43478
Lists		1906-08		Egyptian Museum	C4.5	19	57	Sachau 21	Pap. No. 3444 = J. 43481
Lists		1906-08		Egyptian Museum	C4.6	23	58	Sachau 20	Pap. No. 3443 = J, 43480
Lists		1906-08		Egyptian Museum	C4.7	51	-	Sachau 23	Pap. No. 3446 = J. 43483
Lists		1906-08		Egyptian Museum	C4.8	53	59	Sachau 24	Pap. No. 3447 = J. 43484
Lists	Vatican papyrus	1827 (published 1884)		Biblioteca Apostolica Vaticana	C4.9	74		CIS II 148	Papiro Borgiano Aramaico 1
Other	Chester ostraca			British Museum	D7.13			KAI 271, CIS II 138	E14219
Other	Dream ostracon				D7.17			KAI 270, CIS II 137	
Other	Serapeum Offering Table				D20.1			KAI 268	
Other	Saqqara Aramaic Stele				D20.3			KAI 267	
Other	Carpentras Stele				D20.5			KAI 269	
Other	Ankh-Hapy stele				D20.6			KAI 272	

== Reviews ==
=== Volume 1 ===
- Williamson, H. G. M. (1987). [Review of Textbook of Aramaic Documents from Ancient Egypt 1: Letters, by B. Porten & A. Yardeni]. Vetus Testamentum, 37(4), 493–493. https://doi.org/10.2307/1517566
- Lipiński, E. (1988). [Review of Textbook of Aramaic Documents from Ancient Egypt ('wsp t’wdwt ’rmywt mmşrym h’tyqh), newly copied, edited and translated into Hebrew and English by..., 1. Letters. Appendix: Aramaic Letters from the Bible, by B. Porten & A. Yardeni]. Orientalia, 57(4), 434–436. http://www.jstor.org/stable/43077597
- Kaufman, S. A. (1988). [Review of Textbook of Aramaic Documents from Ancient Egypt. Vol. 1. Letters, by B. Porten & A. Yardeni]. Journal of Near Eastern Studies, 47(4), 289–290. http://www.jstor.org/stable/544888
- Grelot, P. (1988). [Review of Textbook of Aramaic Documents from Ancient Egypt, Newly Copied, Edited and Translated into Hebrew and English, I. Letters. Appendix: Aramaic Letters from the Bible. 34 × 24, by B. Porten & A. Yardeni]. Revue Biblique (1946-), 95(2), 294–299. http://www.jstor.org/stable/44088910

=== Volume 2 ===
- Lipiński, E. (1990). [Review of Textbook of Aramaic Documents from Ancient Egypt ('wsp t’wdwt ’rmywt mmşrym h’tyqh), newly copied, edited and translated into Hebrew and English by..., 2. Contracts. Vol. 1: text, copies in reduced size (LIV-191 p.); vol. 2: copies (37 foldouts), by B. Porten & A. Yardeni]. Orientalia, 59(4), 552–554. http://www.jstor.org/stable/43075793
- Grelot, P. (1990). [Review of Textbook of Aramaic Documents from Ancient Egypt, by B. Porten & A. Yardeni]. Revue Biblique (1946-), 97(2), 270–276. http://www.jstor.org/stable/44089014
- Segal, J. B. (1992). [Review of Textbook of Aramaic Documents from Ancient Egypt, II, Contracts, by B. Porten & A. Yardeni]. The Journal of Egyptian Archaeology, 78, 344–344. https://doi.org/10.2307/3822102

=== Volume 3 ===
- Fitzmyer, Joseph A. (1995). [Review of Textbook of Aramaic Documents from Ancient Egypt, 3: Literature, Accounts, Lists, by B. Porten & A. Yardeni]. Journal of the American Oriental Society, 115(4), 710–711. https://doi.org/10.2307/604758
- Grelot, P. (1996). [Review of Textbook of Aramaic Documents from Ancient Egypt, 3: Literature, Accounts, Lists, by B. Porten & A. Yardeni]. Journal for the Study of Judaism in the Persian, Hellenistic, and Roman Period, 27(3), 351–355. http://www.jstor.org/stable/24660077

=== Volume 4 ===
- Gianto, A. (2000). [Review of Textbook of Aramaic Documents from Ancient Egypt. Newly Copied, Edited and Translated into English. 4: Ostraca and Assorted Inscriptions (Texts and Studies for Students), by B. Porten & A. Yardeni]. Biblica, 81(3), 443–445. http://www.jstor.org/stable/42614297
- Dion, P.-E. (2000). [Review of Textbook of Aramaic Documents from Ancient Egypt. Newly Copied, Edited and Translated into Hebrew and English, Vol. 4: Ostraca and Assorted Inscriptions, by B. Porten & A. Yardeni]. Bulletin of the American Schools of Oriental Research, 318, 77–79. https://doi.org/10.2307/1357731

== Work ==
- Volume 1
- Volume 3
- A Grammar of Egyptian Aramaic

== Previous corpuses ==
- Clermont-Ganneau, Charles Simon (1878). "Origine Perse Des Monuments Araméens d'Égypte (Notes d'archéologie orientale) Premier Article". Revue Archéologique. 36. Presses Universitaires de France: 93–107. ISSN 0035-0737. JSTOR 41735287.
  - "Deuxième Article". Revue Archéologique. 37. Presses Universitaires de France: 21–39. 1879. ISSN 0035-0737. JSTOR 41735338.
- Sayce and Cowley, Aramaic Papyri Discovered at Assuan, (London, 1906)
- Arthur Ungnad, 1911, Aramäische Papyrus aus Elephantine
- Eduard Sachau, 1911, Aramäische Papyrus und Ostraka aus einer jüdischen Militär-Kolonie zu Elephantine
  - Text
  - Plates
- Arthur Ernest Cowley, 1923, Aramaic papyri of the fifth century B.C
- Noël Aimé-Giron, 1931, Textes araméens d'Égypte
- Grelot, Pierre (1972). Documents araméens d'Égypte. Littératures anciennes du Proche-Orient (in French). Éditions du Cerf.
