= Ankh-Hapy stele =

Egyptian-Aramaic stele

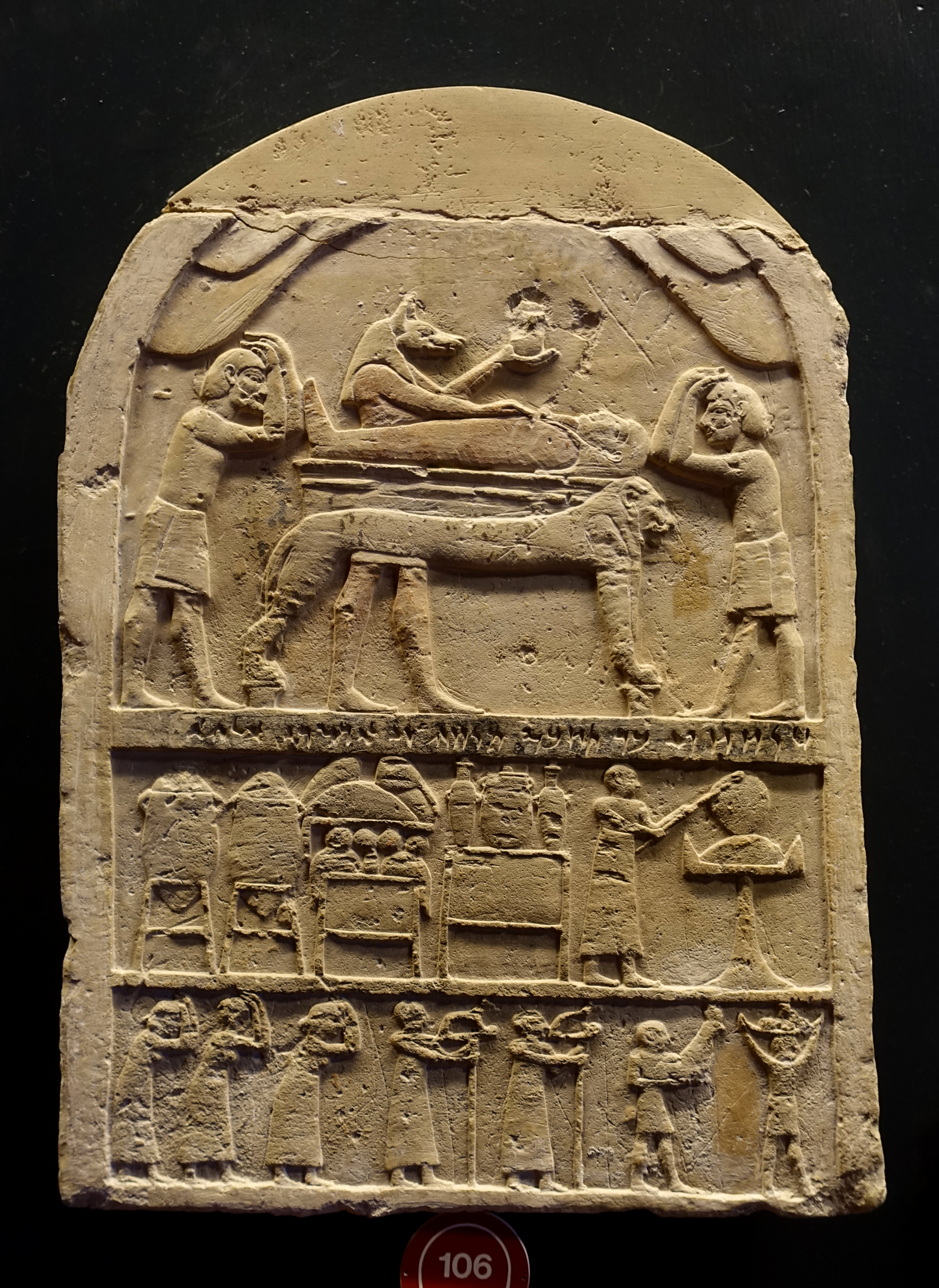
The stele in the Museo Gregoriano Egizio (Gregorian Egyptian Museum, in the Vatican Museums)

The Ankh-Hapy stele is an Egyptian-Aramaic stele dated to 525–404 BCE. It was first published in a letter from François Lenormant to Ernest Renan in the Journal asiatique; Lenormant had noticed the stele in the Vatican collections and had brought a cast from Rome in 1860. Lenormant considered the stele to be reminiscent of the Carpentras Stele.

The inscription was considered to be Aramaic, on the basis that it used the same style of writing and dialect as the Carpentras stele, the Turin papyri, the Blacas papyri and an Aramaic papyrus in the Louvre.

The Aramaic inscription is known as KAI 272, CIS II 142 and TAD C20.6.
