= Blacas papyrus =

Aramaic papyrus found in Egypt

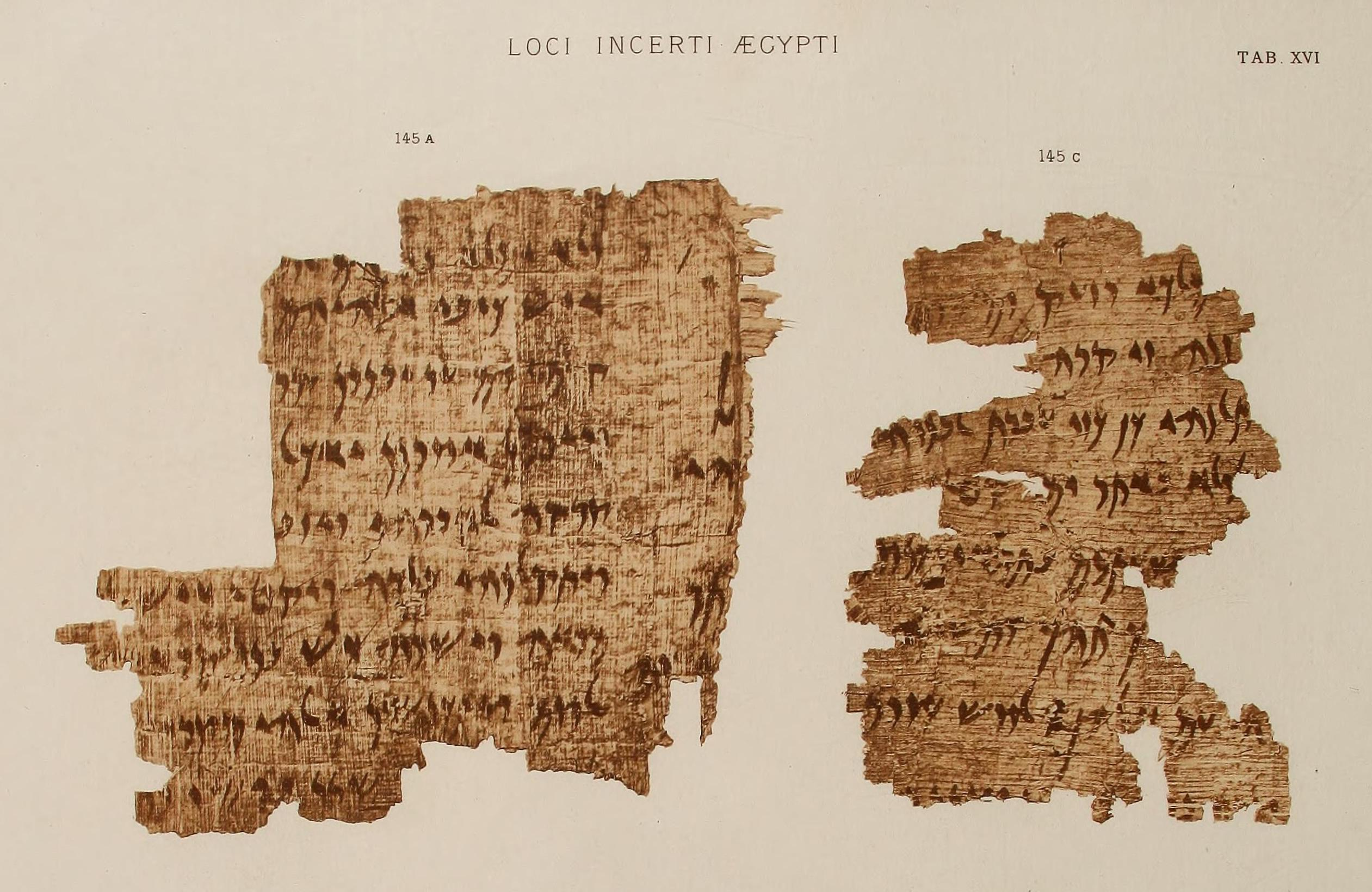
The Blacas papyrus

The Blacas papyrus is an Aramaic papyrus, of which two separate fragments survive, found in Saqqara in 1825. It is known as CIS II 145 and TAD C1.2.

The fragments are held in the British Library as Oriental Papyrus 106* A and B.

It was initially published in 1827 by Italian scholar Michelangelo Lanci as a "Phoenician-Assyrian text". Lanci explained as follows:

When I expressed my opinion on the Carpentras Stele, I stated that it differed so much from other [Phoenician] epigraphs that a second alphabet could be composed from it, greatly varied from the first, and then I determined that the Phoenicians had two forms of writing, one which was the mother of the Samaritan alphabet, the other of the Assyrian alphabet, both used by the Jews: hence I called this second form, Phoenician-Assyrian character, to make the distinction.

They were sold to the British Museum in 1866 by the estate of Pierre Louis Jean Casimir de Blacas, who had purchased it shortly after its discovery.

The text became the standard by which other Aramaic papyri were judged – particularly the Elephantine papyri:

From the Euting papyrus which entered the Strassburg Library in 1900 down to the very last published by Prof. Sachau in 1907 all have been judged upon the standard of the Blacassiani; and if not the slightest objection was made as to their referring to, or being dated after various kings of the Achemenides dynasty, it was so because in the year 1878 the "Revue Archéologique" set forth the theory that the Blacassiani were of that period, a theory which although passed over on its appearance by the very man to whom the public epistle propounding it was inscribed, Ernest Renan, gradually gained ground until the Marquis de Vogüé by its adoption caused it to be raised to the dignity of indisputable doctrine. But it is only natural and reasonable that, if the proof were furnished that the Blacassiani papyri have been misunderstood, any doctrine based on their faulty interpretation should fall to the ground, and that only one way should remain to deal with it: complete abandonment and total oblivion.

According to Stanley Arthur Cook, writing in 1898:

According to some the [Blacas Papyri] deal with a tale told by an Aramaean who was hostile to the Eg. religion; others find in them an Egypto-Judaic Haggadah on Ex. i. They are too mutilated and obscure to allow of our arriving at any certain decision.

In recent years it was shown that the two fragments fit together, connecting by a single line.

== See also ==
- Hor son of Punesh

== Bibliography ==
- British Museum Papyrus CVI*, Facsimiles of manuscripts and inscriptions. Oriental series, 1875
- Mitchell, T.C.; British Museum (2004). "Document 51: Aramaic Papyrus". The Bible in the British Museum: Interpreting the Evidence. Paulist Press. p. 95. ISBN 978-0-8091-4292-7.
- Gesenius, Papyri Blacassian, Scripturae linguaeque phoeniciae monumenta quotquot
- Clermont-Ganneau, Ch. (1879). "ORIGINE PERSE DES MONUMENTS ARAMÉENS D'ÉGYPTE (NOTES D'ARCHÉOLOGIE ORIENTALE) DEUXIÈME ARTICLE". Revue Archéologique. 37. Presses Universitaires de France: 26–37. eISSN 2104-3868. ISSN 0035-0737. JSTOR 41735338.
- Lanci, Michelangelo [in Italian] (1827). La Sacra Scrittura illustrata con monumenti fenico-assirj ed egiziani (in Italian). Societa tipografica.

== Gallery ==
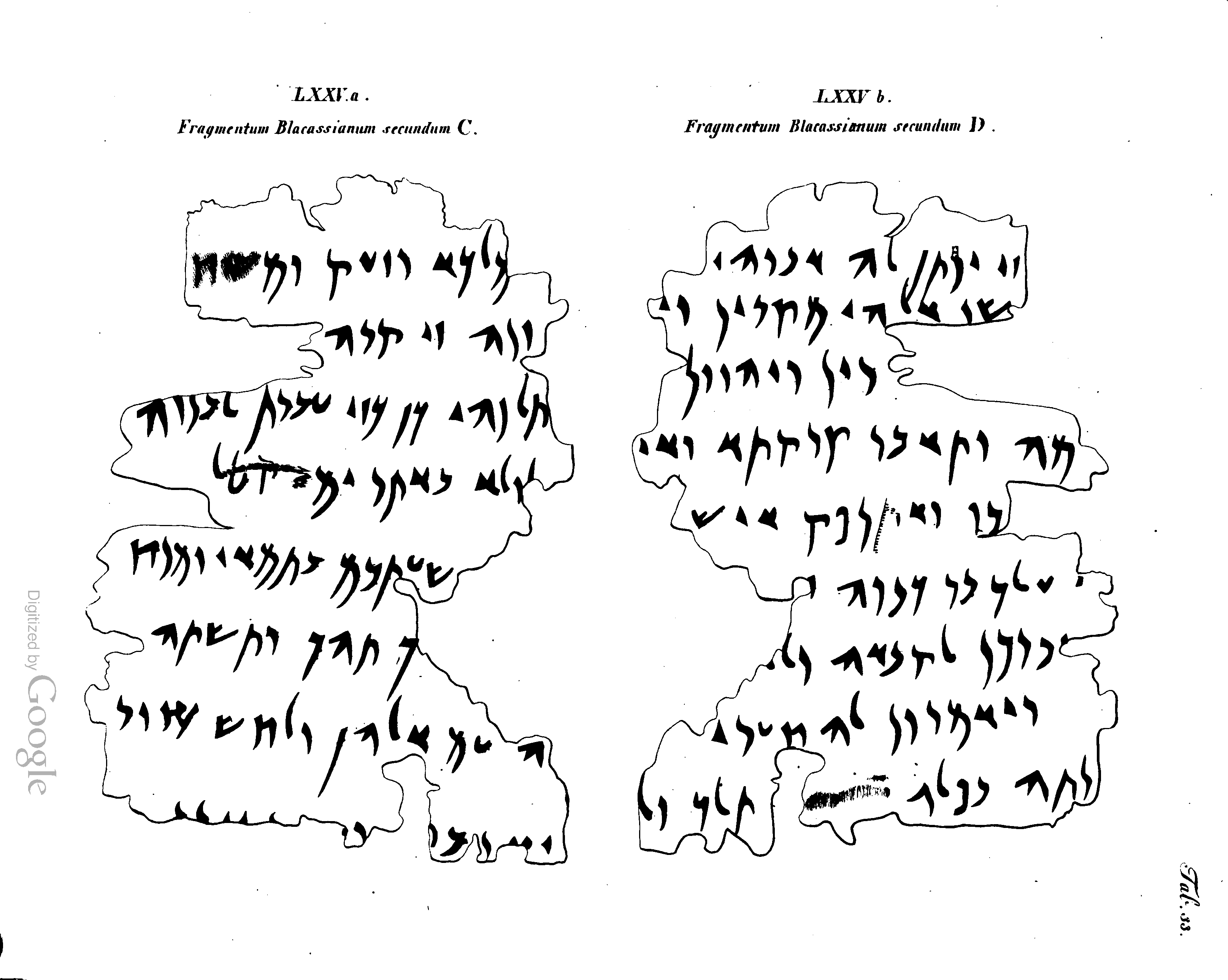
Both sides of one fragment of the papyrus

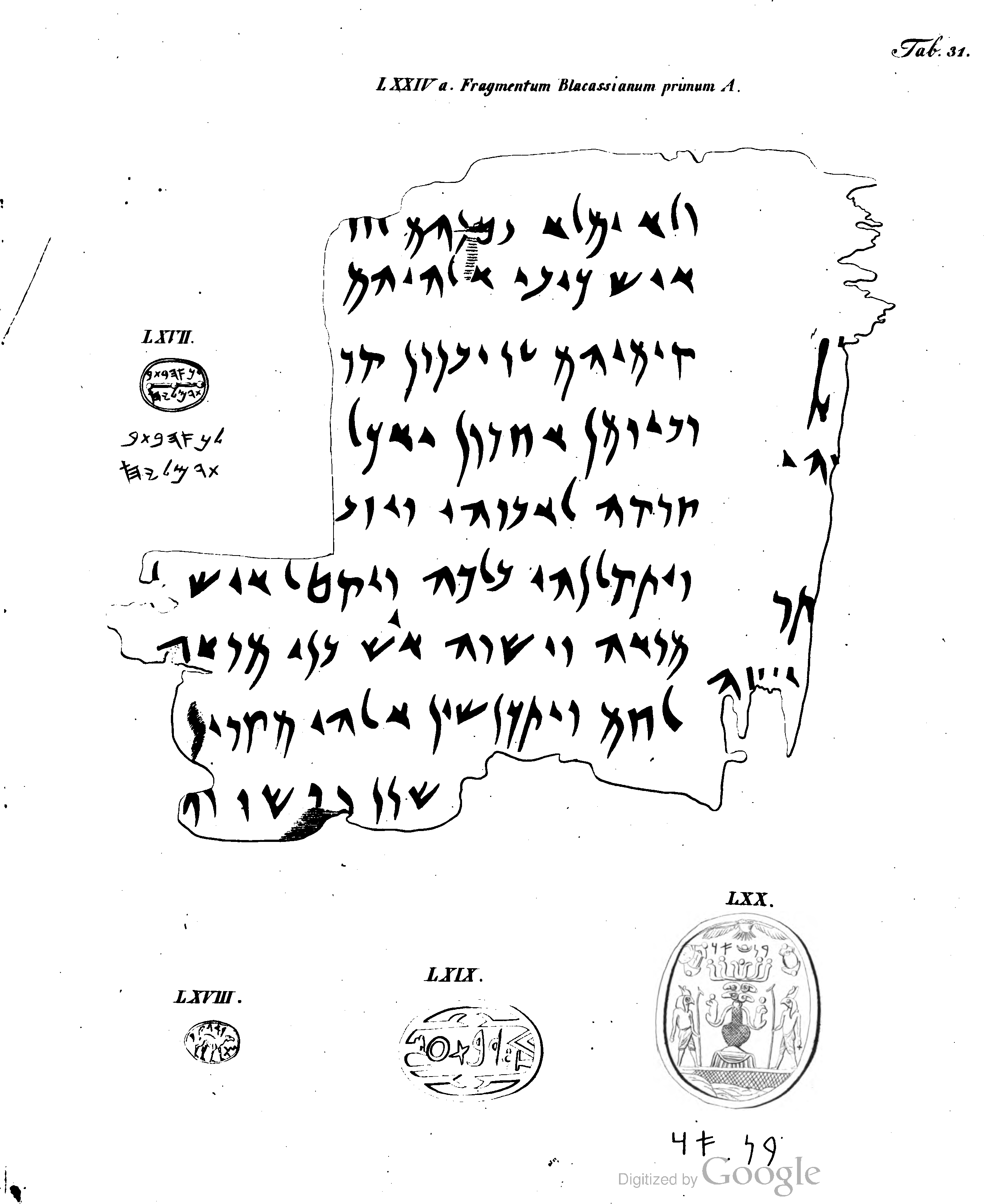
The first side of one of the papyrus fragments

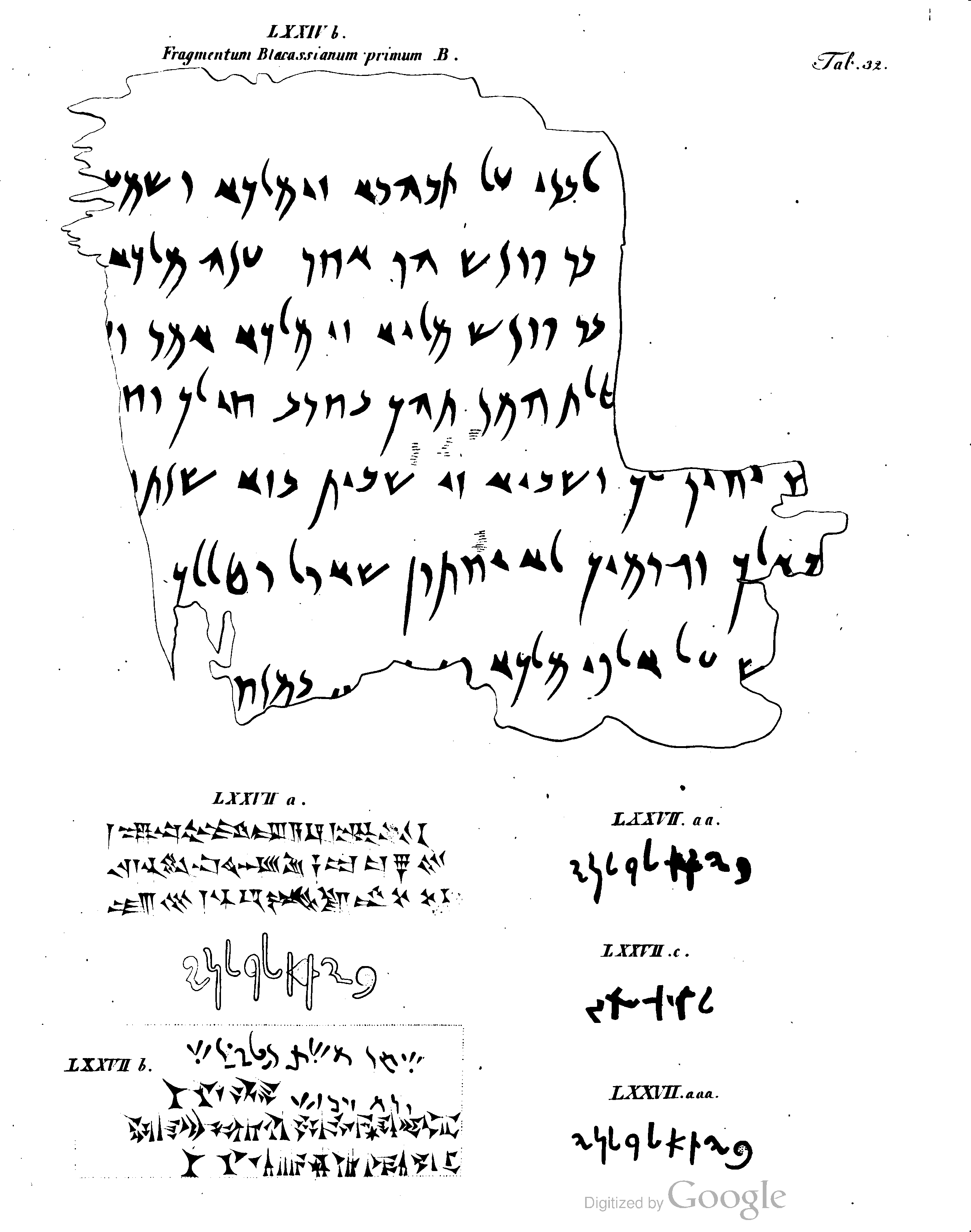
The second side of one of the papyrus fragments

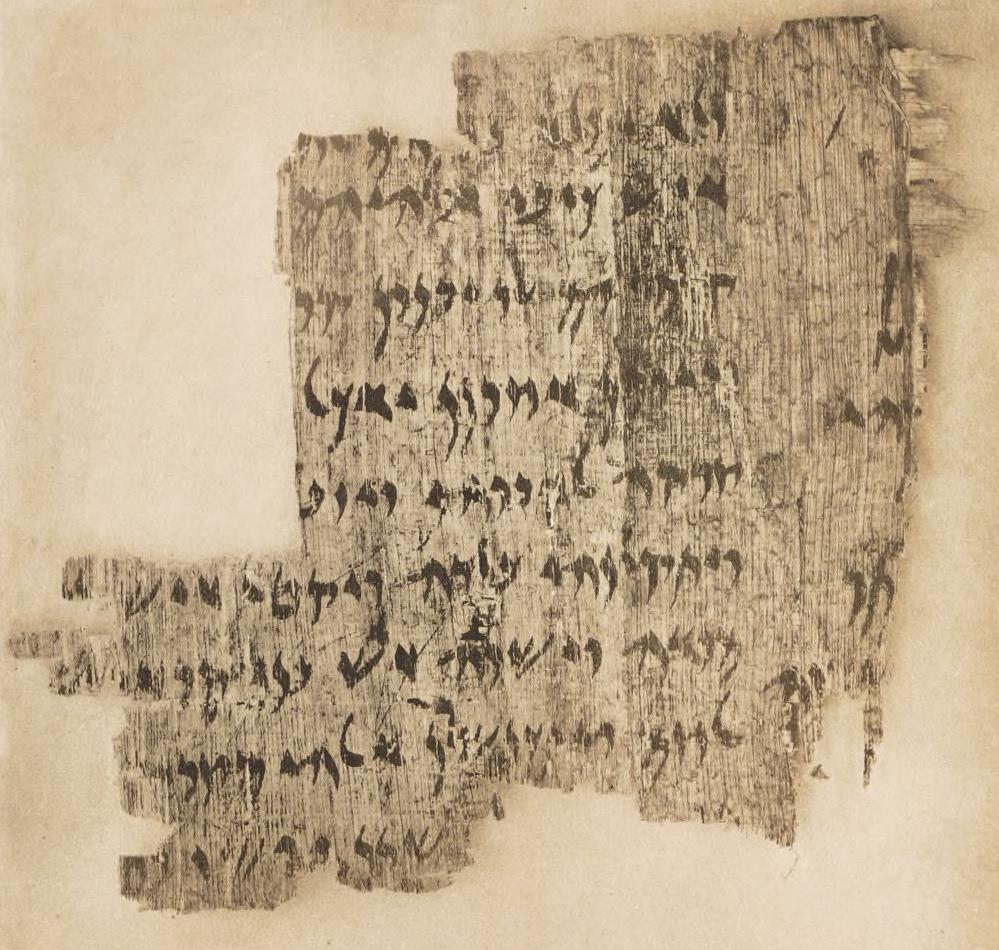

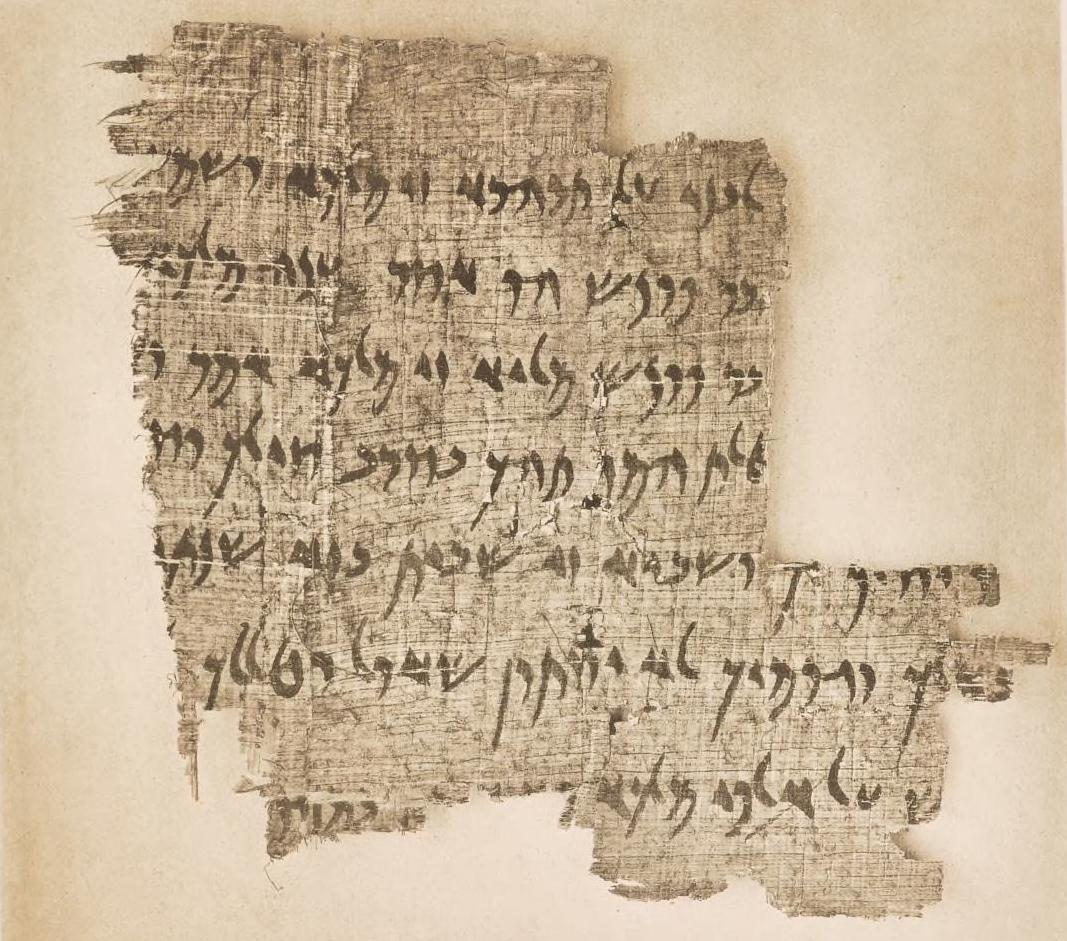

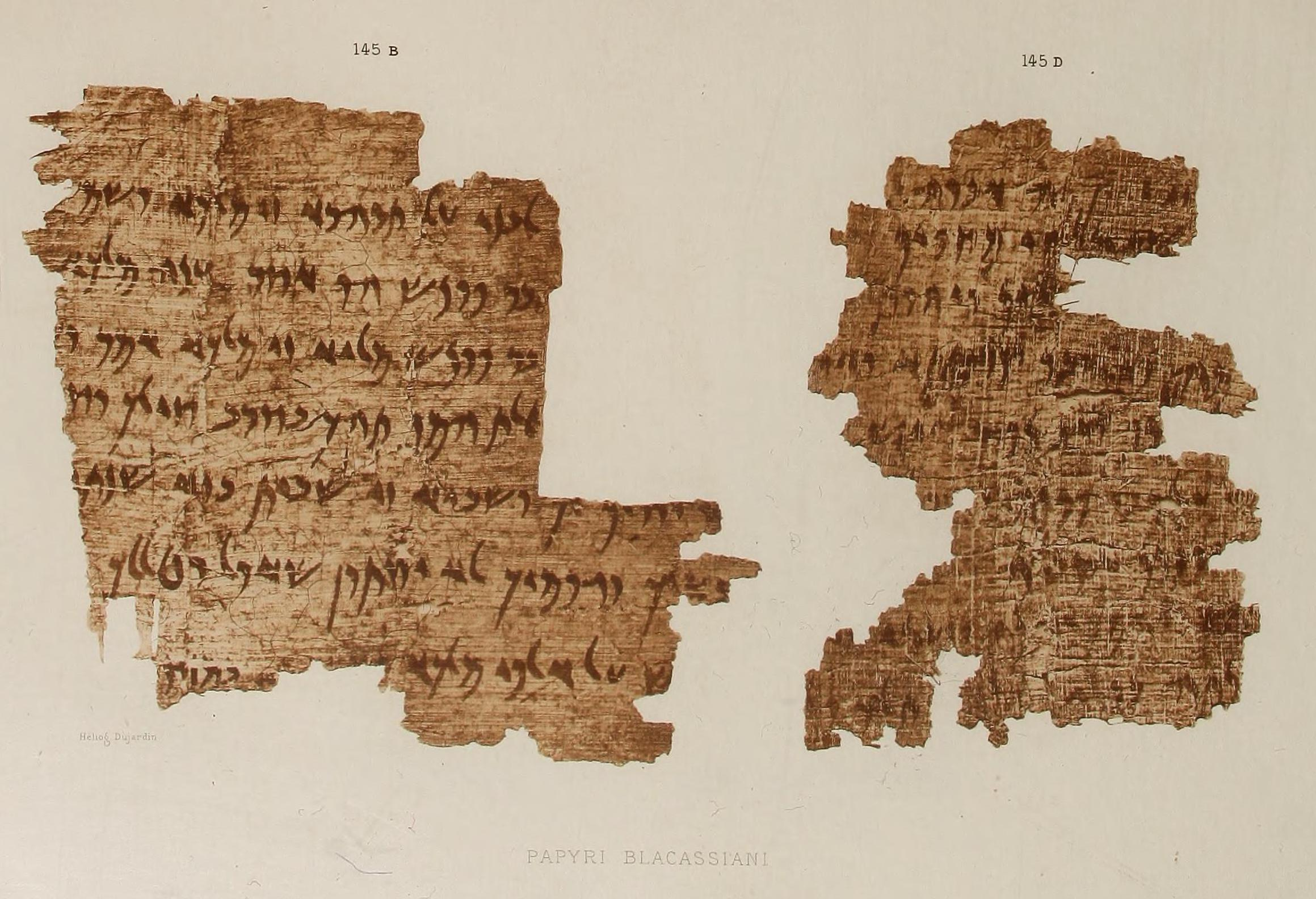
