= Behistun papyrus =

Aramaic-Egyptian fragmentary partial copy of the Behistun inscription

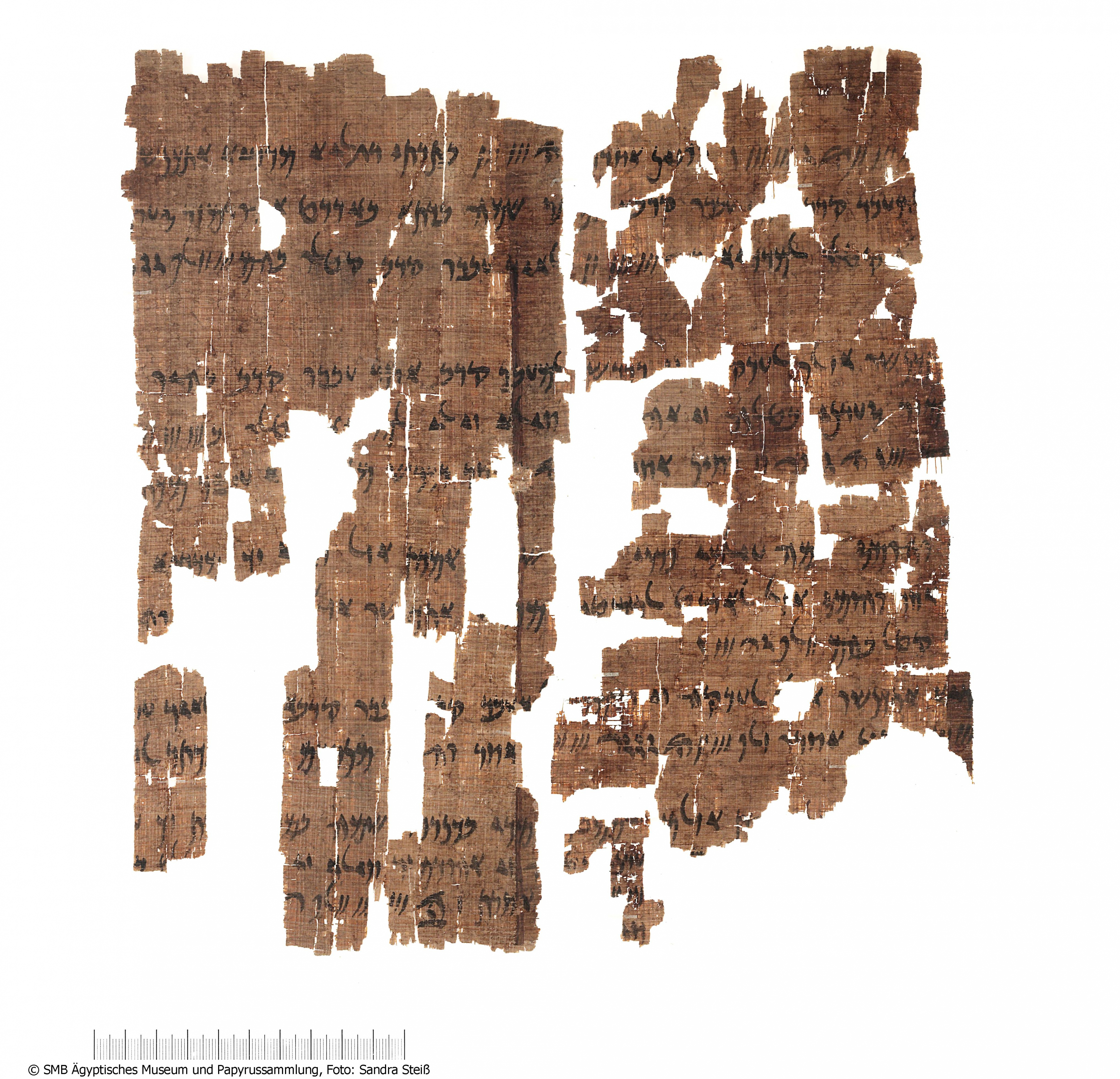
Column V (verso) of the Behistun papyrus, showing fragments of 17 of the original 18 lines

The Behistun papyrus, formally known as Papyrus Berlin 13447, is an Aramaic-Egyptian fragmentary partial copy of the Behistun inscription, and one of the Elephantine papyri discovered during the German excavations between 1906 and 1908.

The text is known as DB Aram in the identification code of the Achaemenid royal inscriptions, and separately as TADAE C2.1+3.13. It is the only known Aramaic version of an Achaemenid royal inscription, despite Aramaic being considered the lingua franca of the Achaemenid Empire.

The papyrus is part of the Berlin Papyrus Collection and held at the Egyptian Museum of Berlin.

== Discovery and Historical Context ==
The papyrus was unearthed amid the 1906-1908 German archaeological excavations at Elephantine, a site known for its historical significance as a Jewish colony within the Persian Empire. The papyrus's discovery was a part of a broader excavation effort to uncover the cultural, social, and political landscape of the region during antiquity.

== Publication ==
Eduard Sachau's publication in 1911 brought the papyrus to scholarly attention, followed by Arthur Ernest Cowley's English language edition in 1923. Subsequent research and contributions, including the 1982 edition by the Corpus Inscriptionum Iranicarum (CII 1.1), provided further understanding of the papyrus's significance.

== Content ==
The document contains two primary texts, one on the front (the Behistun text) and one on the back.

=== Behistun inscription ===
The papyrus's recto and initial columns of the verso feature an Aramaic version of Darius I's well known Behistun Inscription (DB Aram). The original rock inscription, itself carved in three languages and scripts, narrates Darius I's ascension to power, his accomplishments, and his lineage. The Berlin Papyrus's version of DB Aram offers scholars a unique window into the linguistic nuances and variations of this monumental proclamation.

The papyrus is highly fragmented, but is thought to have originally been written on a scroll of 24 sheets in eleven columns, nine on the recto and two on the verso. None of the eleven original columns are preserved intact; in total parts of fourteen paragraphs are readable:

- Column I: fragments of 2 lines
- Column III: fragments of 4 lines
- Column IV: fragments of 10 lines
- Column V: fragments of 17 of the original 18 lines recovered
- Column VII: fragments of almost all lines recovered
- Column VIII: fragments of almost all lines recovered
- Column XI (verso): fragments of all except upper right half and the last line

=== Memoranda (Mem.) and Administrative Insights ===
The verso columns of the papyrus host a collection of memoranda, providing detail on the administrative and economic activities of Elephantine. These memoranda record transactions involving diverse goods, including valuable items such as bowls and incense burners, as well as commodities like grains. The repetition of the term "zokrān" (memorandum) highlights a systematic approach to documenting transactions and suggests an organized record-keeping practice.

The coexistence of DB Aram and the memoranda on the same papyrus raised scholarly questions about their role within the YHW-temple library. This suggests a connection between administrative records and educational materials. It is possible that the papyrus served as a resource for training scribes in the art of temple management and record-keeping, revealing a nexus between practical applications and pedagogical purposes.

== Bibliography ==
- Eduard Sachau, 1911, Aramäische Papyrus und Ostraka aus einer jüdischen Militär-Kolonie zu Elephantine
  - Text
  - Plates
- Arthur Ernest Cowley, 1923, Aramaic papyri of the fifth century B.C, page 248-271
- Bezalel Porten and Ada Yardeni, Textbook of Aramaic Documents from Ancient Egypt, Volume 3, pages 59-70
- Halévy, J., “L’inscription de Darius Ier à Behistun: Texte araméen” RevSém 20 (1912c): 252–62
- Gray, Louis H. (1913). "Iranian Miscellanies: On the Aramaic Version of the Behistān Inscriptions". Journal of the American Oriental Society. 33. American Oriental Society: 281–294. doi:10.2307/592834. ISSN 0003-0279. JSTOR 592834.
- Greenfield, Jonas C.; Porten, Bezalel (1982). Corpus Inscriptionum Iranicarum: The Bisitun Inscription of Darius the Great. Aramaic Version. Pt. 1. Vol. 5. Lund Humphries. ISBN 978-0-85331-458-5.
- Tavernier, J., “The Origin of DB Aram. 66-69” NABU 4 (1999): 83–84.
- Bae Chul-hyun, "Comparative Studies of King Darius's Bisitun Inscription." Ph.D. Dissertation, Harvard Univ.. (2001): .
- Bae Chul-hyun, Literary Stemma Of King Darius’s; Bisitun Inscription Evidence Of The Persian Empire’s Multilingualism
- Sims-Williams, Nicholas (1981). "The Final Paragraph of the Tomb-Inscription of Darius I (DNb, 50-60): The Old Persian Text in the Light of an Aramaic Version". Bulletin of the School of Oriental and African Studies, University of London. 44 (1). Cambridge University Press: 1–7. doi:10.1017/S0041977X00104355. ISSN 1474-0699. JSTOR 616291. S2CID 162957525.
- Tavernier, Jan (2001). "An Achaemenid Royal Inscription: The Text of Paragraph 13 of the Aramaic Version of the Bisitun Inscription". Journal of Near Eastern Studies. 60 (3). University of Chicago Press: 161–176. doi:10.1086/468914. hdl:2078/92533. ISSN 0022-2968. JSTOR 546095. S2CID 161413971.
- Mitchell, Christine (2017). "Berlin Papyrus P. 13447 and the Library of the Yehudite Colony at Elephantine". Journal of Near Eastern Studies. 76 (1). University of Chicago Press: 139–147. doi:10.1086/690226. ISSN 0022-2968. S2CID 164833849. Archived from the original on 30 September 2023.
