= Serapeum Offering Table =

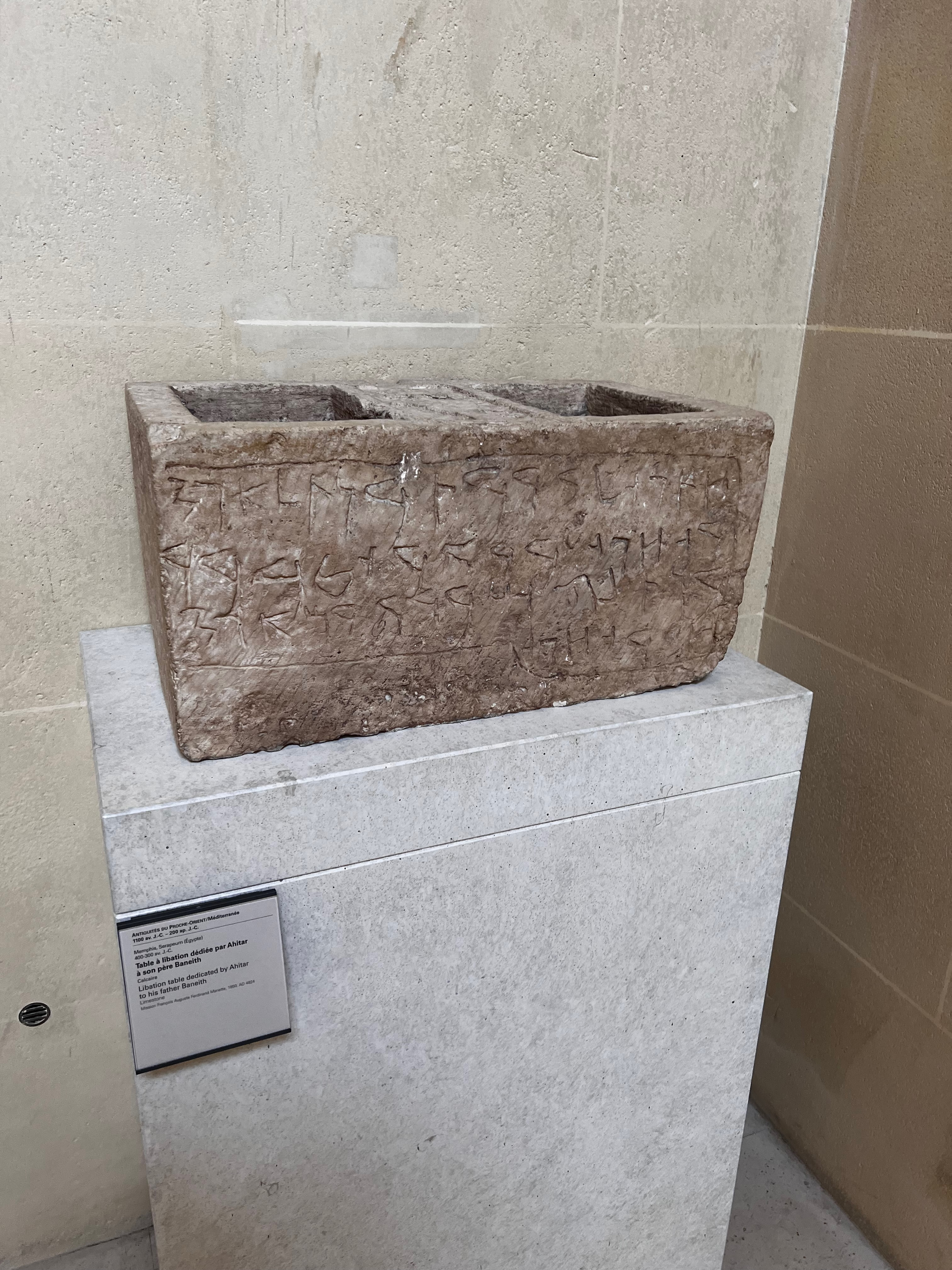
On display at the Louvre (AO 4824)

The Serapeum Offering Table is an Aramaic-inscribed offering table for libation found at the Serapeum of Saqqara in Egypt by Auguste Mariette in 1850. It has been dated to 400 BCE.

The inscription is known as KAI 268, CIS II 123 and TAD C20.1. It is a dedication by Ahital to his father Baneith.

== Bibliography ==
- Bargès, J.J.L. (1856). Nouvelle interprétation de l'inscription phénicienne découverte par m. Mariette dans le sérapéum de Memphis. Thèses religieuses (in French). J. Rouvier.
