= Saqqara Aramaic Stele =

Egyptian-Aramaic stele

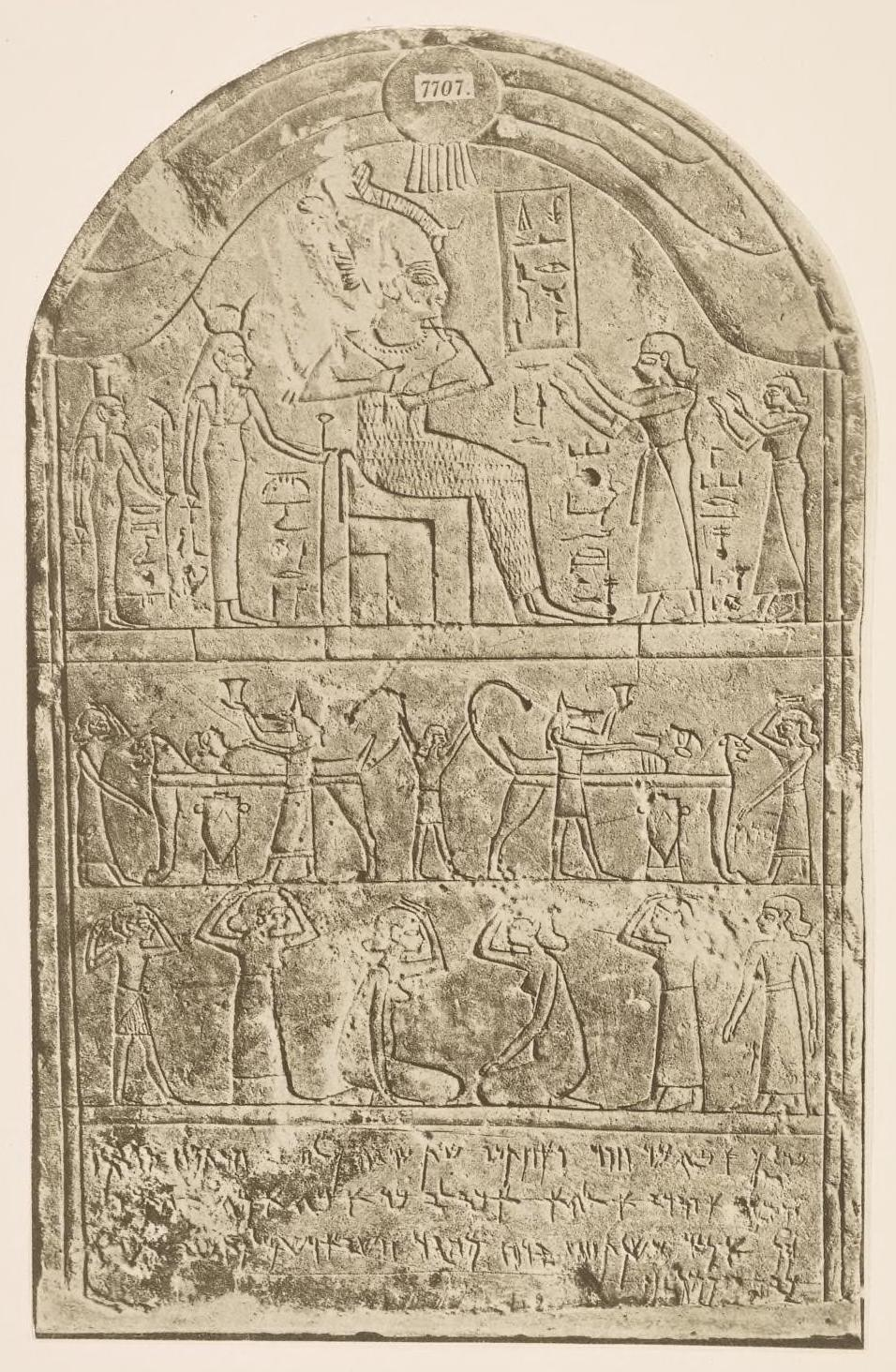
The stele in the Berlin museum

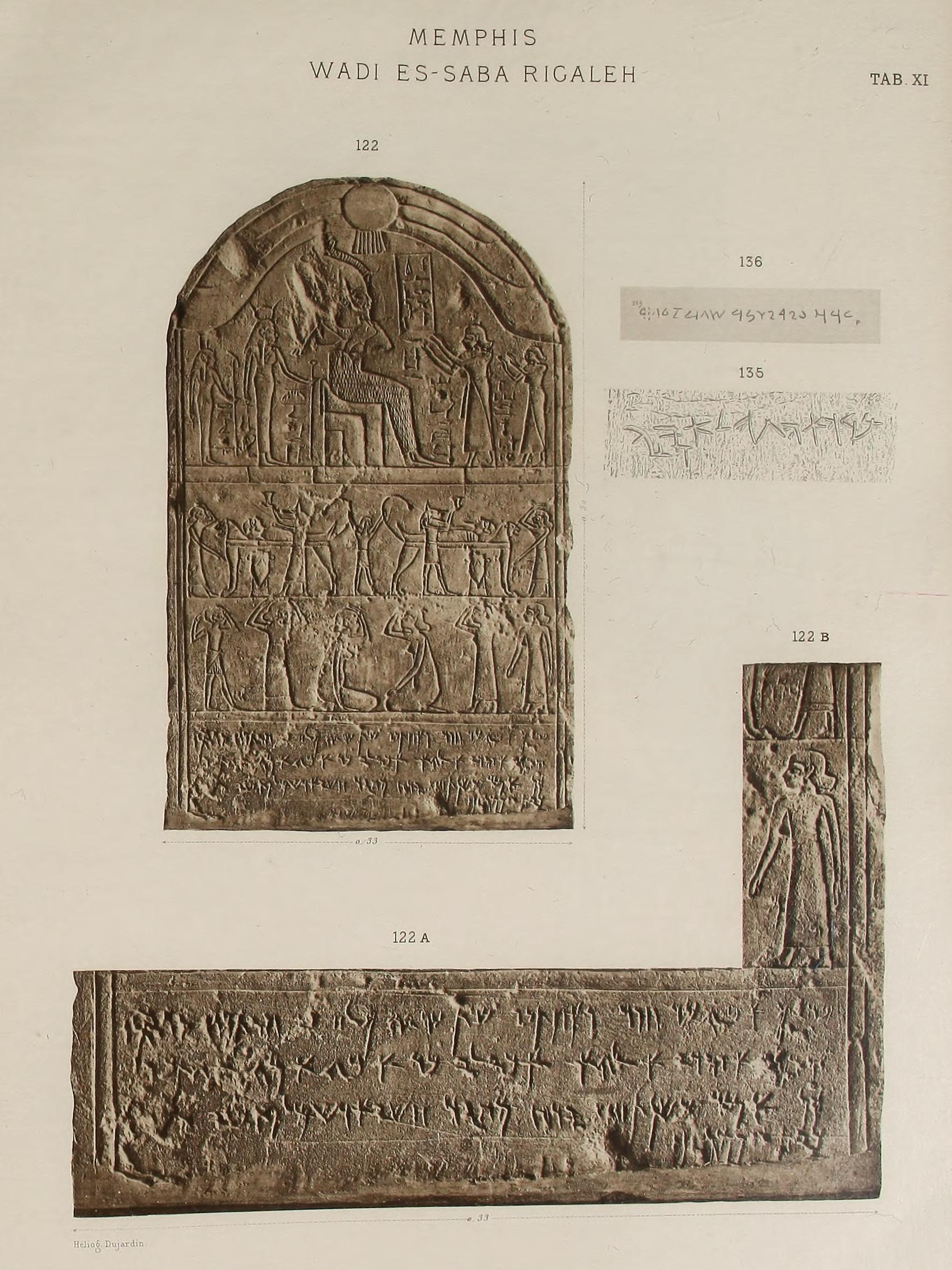
The stele in the Corpus Inscriptionum Semiticarum (CIS II 122)

The Saqqara Aramaic Stele, also known as the Berlin stele or the Egypto-Aramaean Stela of Ahatabu, is an Egyptian-Aramaic stele found in Saqqara in 1877.

It was held in the Neues Museum in Berlin which was destroyed in World War II.

The Aramaic inscription is known as KAI 267, CIS II 122 and TAD C20.3. Its content according to KAI is:

בריך אבה בר חור ואחתבו ברת עדיה כל 2 זי חסתמח קריתא	bryk ʾbh br ḥwr wʾḥtbw brt ʿdyh kl 2 zy ḥstmḥ qrytʾ
קדם אוסרי אלהא אבסלי בר אבה אמה אחתבו	qdm ʾwsry ʾlhʾ ʾbsly br ʾbh ʾmh ʾḥtbw
כן אמר בשנת 4 ירח מחיר חשיארש מלכא בזי מ[לכיא]	kn ʾmr bšnt 4 yrḥ mḥyr ḥšyʾrš mlkʾ bzy m[lkyʾ]
ביד פמנ[...]	byd pmn[...]

== Bibliography ==
- Wasmuth, Melanie; Silverman, Jason M.; Töyräänvuori, Joanna (2022-12-29). "The Egypto-Aramaean Stela of Ahatabu (Berlin ÄM 7707): A Cross-Cultural Discussion". Die Welt des Orients. 52 (2): 198–251. doi:10.13109/wdor.2022.52.2.198. hdl:10138/353222. ISSN 0043-2547.
