= Setne Khamwas and Si-Osire =

Demotic Egyptian story

Start of the tale in papyrus EA 10822,1 in the British Museum

The Tale of Setne Khamwas and Si-Osire (also known as Setne II) is a Demotic Egyptian story attested on papyrus in Roman Egypt.

Setne (loosely based on the historical Prince Khaemweset) is the fourth son of Ramesses II and acquires a reputation as more of a scholar than a politician. In Setne I (Setne Khamwas and Naneferkaptah), he had an adventure with the magical Book of Thoth. In Setne II, he and his wife have a child named Si-Osire who sports amazing abilities and mystical talents.

== Summary ==
The very first part of Setne II is lost. The preserved fragment seems to start after Setne and his wife Mehusekhe have been praying for a son. They have one and name him Si-Osire after being instructed to do so in a dream. Si-Osire matures rapidly and amazes his tutors. Setne and Si-Osire then observe two funeral processions — one of a rich man who is attended to with honor, and another a poor man who is carried off with no fanfare to the cemetery. Setne remarks that the rich man must have been happy to be remembered with wailing and mourning. Si-Osire contradicts his father and offers to show him the fates of the poor man not mourned, and the rich man who was mourned. The two visit the Duat, the land of the dead; several lines of the story are lost, presumably detailing their journey and the initial areas toured. At the fourth hall, the pair see tormented souls taunted with water and food just out of reach. The fifth hall contains noble spirits, while spirits accused of crimes stand outside a gate pleading for entrance. The gate's pivot rested atop one unfortunate soul's right eye, who pled for mercy and loudly cursed his fate. The sixth hall was a tribunal where the servants of the Netherworld made accusations against dead souls for their crimes. In the seventh hall, Osiris, Anubis, and Thoth hold court with their servants; Setne spies one especially distinguished servant wearing royal linen, standing near Osiris, whom he concludes must be of exceptionally high rank. The nature of the afterlife is addressed, where the good deeds are weighed against the misdeeds done in a person's life by the three gods. After this, Si-Osire explains to his father the truth: that the richly dressed man he observed standing in a place of honor near Osiris was the unmourned poor man he had just witnessed. The rich man's "burial equipment" were wrested off him and given to the poor man, whose good deeds had outweighed his misdeeds. Si-Osire reveals that the miserable man upon whose eye the gate hinged was the rich man who had been buried with honor and ceremony back in Memphis. He concludes that "He who is beneficent on earth, to him one is beneficent in the netherworld. And he who is evil, to him one is evil. It is so decreed forever."

In the second part, Si-Osire has aged into a mighty magician at the age of merely 12. A chieftain of the Kingdom of Kush poses a puzzle to Ramesses II: how to read the contents of a sealed letter. In the summary of Ioannis M. Konstantinos,

the Pharaoh and his courtiers are at a complete loss. Ramses calls his son, the wise Setne Khamwas, but he too is puzzled and asks for a delay of ten days, to think of some solution; he returns home and falls into despair. Khamwas' son, the young Si-Osire, learns the cause of this distress and reassures his father: he himself can guess the contents of the sealed letter without opening it. Setne Khamwas is not convinced at first by this amazing declaration and asks for proof of Si-Osire's professed abilities. Si-Osire has no difficulty to demonstrate them: 'My father Setne, go down to the ground-floor room of your house, where you keep your book-scrolls. Every book that you will take out of the chest, I shall tell you what book it is and I shall read it without opening and seeing it.' This is indeed what happens: Si-Osire magically reads the contents of his father's books without opening them. So Setne joyfully takes his son to the Pharaoh, and the next day Si-Osire guesses in the same miraculous way the contents of the Nubian's sealed letter.

It is revealed that Si-Osire is actually a famous magician from the time of Thutmose III, who returned to save Egypt from a Nubian magician. After the confrontation, Si-Osire disappears, and Khaemwaset and his wife have a real son who is also named Si-Osire in honor of the magician.

== Influence and similar stories ==
The story of Setne and Si-Osire's trip to the land of the dead has been compared with similar tales in the Jewish and Christian traditions, suggesting the motif of a rich man and a poor man who experience a reversal of fortunes in the afterlife was a shared one in the Egypt-Judea region. A story in the Palestinian Talmud relates how a rich tax collector named Bar Ma'yan and a poor Torah scholar die the same day; a friend is troubled at the rich man's lavish funeral compared to his poor friend dying obscurity. He has a dream where the rich man is in torment, and the poor man happy in paradise; this is due to the fact that the rich man only did one good deed his life, which was rewarded in his funeral, while the poor man committed only one sin, which was punished by his unremarked death. In the Christian gospels, Jesus tells the parable of the rich man and Lazarus; that version of the story differs in not claiming that the rich man had done any specific bad deeds, however, with the rich man in torment for seemingly no other reason than being rich.

Some have also argued that the Egyptian story is an answer to the biblical account about the Queen of Sheba testing Solomon with hard "questions" in 1 Kings 10:1.

== See also ==
- Greek Magical Papyri
- Hor son of Punesh
