= Umm al-Amad votive inscription =

Votive offering with Phoenician inscription

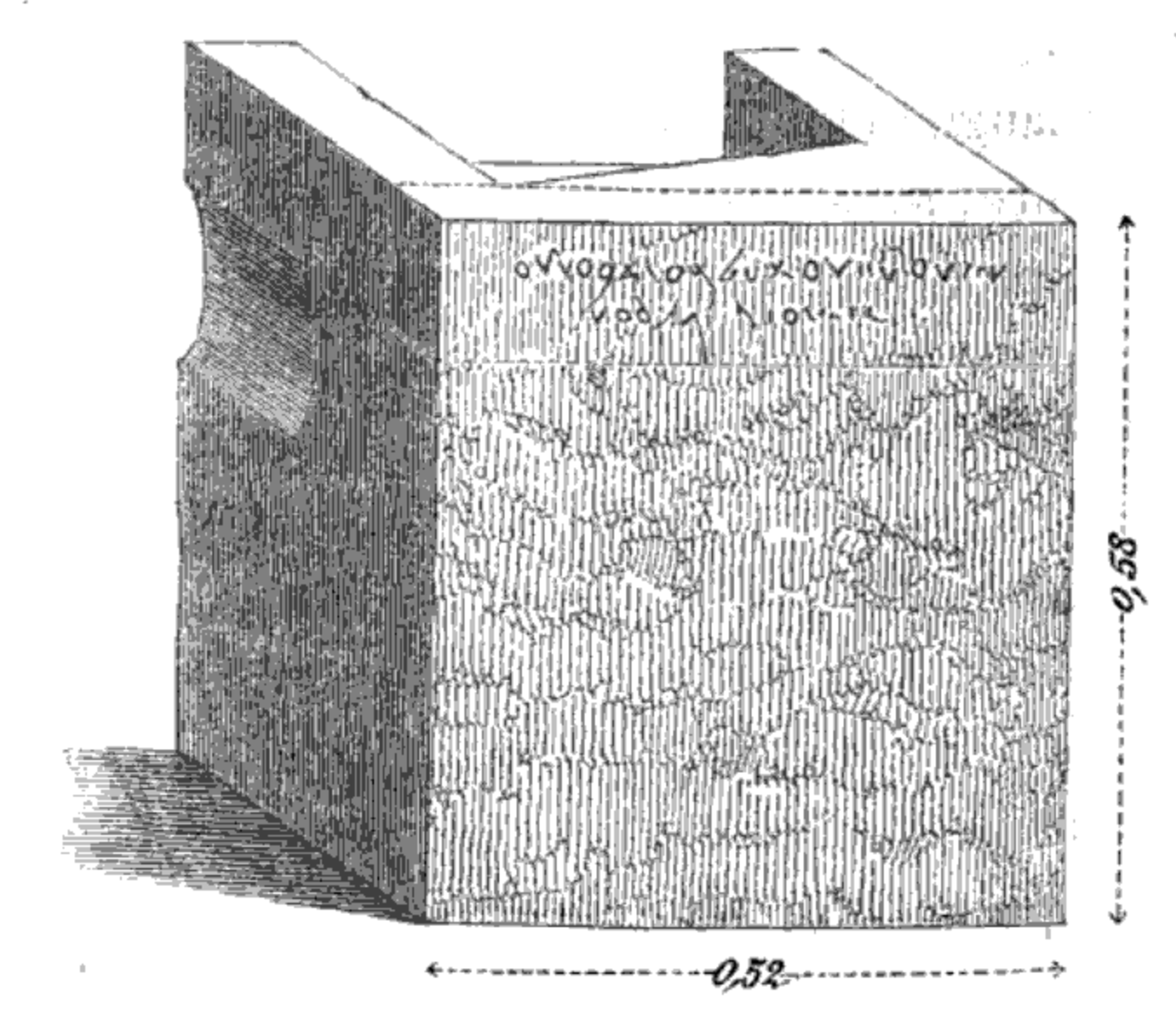
Umm al-Amad votive inscription, prior to Renan sawing off the inscription

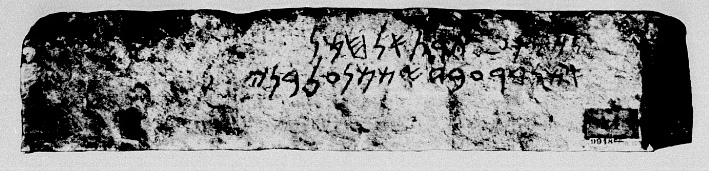
The sawed-off inscription (today in the Louvre) as photographed in Renan's Mission de Phénicie

The Umm Al-Amad votive inscription is an ex-voto Phoenician inscription of two lines. Discovered during Ernest Renan's Mission de Phénicie in 1860–61, it was the second-longest of the three inscriptions found at Umm al-Amad. All three inscriptions were found on the north side of the hill.

Renan stated that “It was traced on one of those cubes of stone, notched on one side, which are frequently found in the neighborhood of temples, and served perhaps to contain votive offerings.” Renan sawed off the part that bore the inscription in order to bring it back to France.

A debate between scholars took place over whether it was dedicated to "Moloch-Astarte" or "Queen [Malik] Astarte".

The inscription is known as CIS I 8. Today it is held at the Louvre, with ID number AO 4830.

The inscription reads:

LMLK‘(Š)TRT ’L ḤMN
To MLK‘(Š)TRT, Hammon-god (sun goddess?)

’Š NDR ‘BD’ŠMN ‘L BNY
dedicated by 'Abd-Eshmun, for/with my son.

== Bibliography ==
- Editio Princeps: Renan, Ernest (1862). "Trois Inscriptions Phéniciennes Trouvées à Oum-El-Awamid". Journal asiatique: Ou recueil de mémoires d'extraits et de notices relatifs à l'histoire, à la philosophie, aux sciences, à la littérature et aux langues des peuples orientaux (in French). 20. Société Asiatique.
- M. Halévy, LA DEUXIÈME INSCRIPTION D'OUMM EL-'AWÂMID, Mélanges d’Epigraphie sémitique (Paris, 1874, p. 57
