= Gonzague Ryckmans =

Belgian priest and scholar (1887–1969)

Constantin Louis Gonzague Ryckmans (1887–1969) was a Belgian priest, scholar and academic who became an internationally recognised specialist on inscriptions from pre-Islamic Arabia. From 1926 until his retirement in 1958, he worked at the Catholic University of Leuven.
