= Ada Yardeni =

Israeli epigraphist

- עדה ירדני
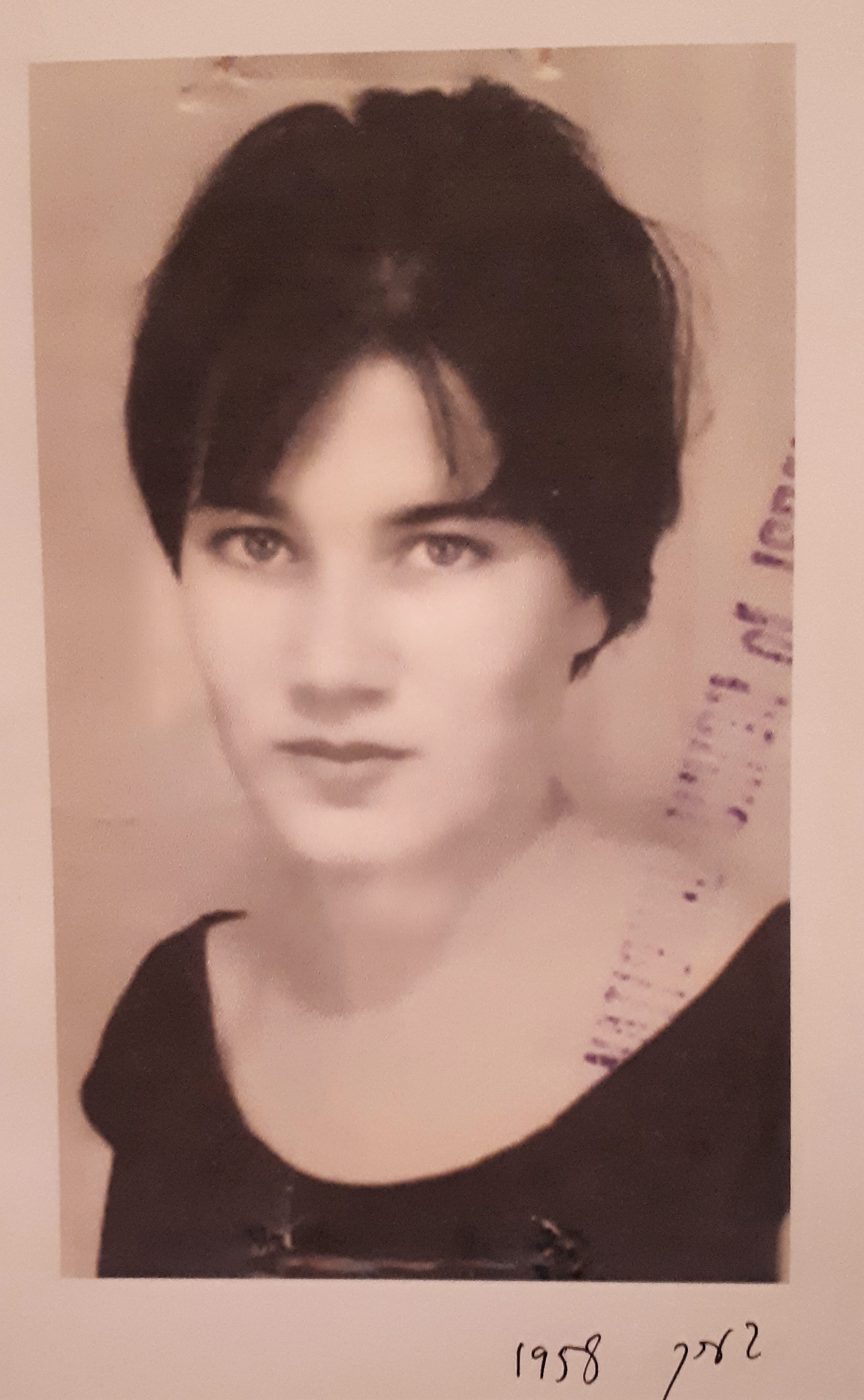
- Born: July 29, 1937; Jerusalem, Mandatory Palestine
- Died: June 29, 2018 (aged 80); Israel
- Education: Hebrew University of Jerusalem
- Occupation: Palaeography
- Website: https://adayardeni.com

Ada Yardeni (Hebrew: עדה ירדני; 29 July 1937 – 29 June 2018) was an Israeli graphic artist and epigraphist.

== Biography ==
Ada Yardeni was the daughter of piyyut scholar Menahem Zulay. She contributed to the deciphering of the Dead Sea Scrolls.
