= Corpus Inscriptionum Semiticarum =

1881–1962 ancient inscriptions collection

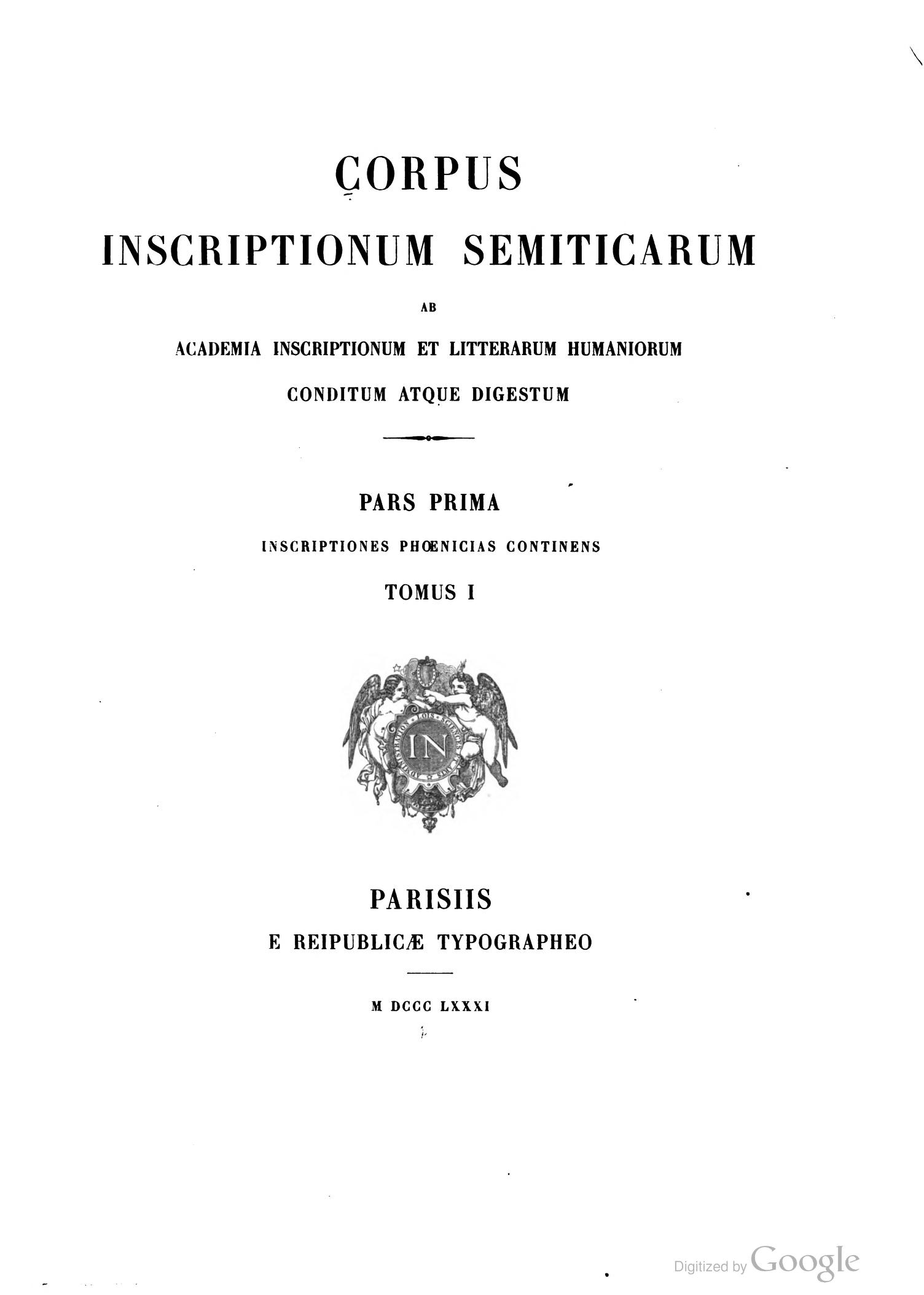
Front cover of the first edition

The Corpus Inscriptionum Semiticarum ("Corpus of Semitic Inscriptions", abbreviated CIS) is a collection of ancient inscriptions in Semitic languages produced since the end of 2nd millennium BC until the rise of Islam. It was published in Latin. In a note recovered after his death, Ernest Renan stated that: "Of all I have done, it is the Corpus I like the most."

The first part was published in 1881, fourteen years after the beginning of the project. Renan justified the fourteen-year delay in the preface to the volume, pointing to the calamity of the Franco-Prussian War and the difficulties that arose in the printing the Phoenician characters, whose first engraving was proven incorrect in light of the inscriptions discovered subsequently. A smaller collection – Répertoire d'Épigraphie Sémitique ("Repertory of Semitic Epigraphy", abbreviated RES) – was subsequently created to present the Semitic inscriptions without delay and in a deliberately concise way as they became known, and was published in French rather than Latin. The Répertoire was for the Corpus Inscriptionum Semiticarum what the Ephemeris epigraphica latina was for the Corpus Inscriptionum Latinarum.

The publication of the series continued until 1962.

== History and scope ==
The project began on April 17, 1867 when the French Académie des Inscriptions et Belles-Lettres accepted the proposal of a commission led by Ernest Renan to begin an initiative similar to German corpora of ancient Latin and Greek Corpus Inscriptionum Graecarum (CIG), and Corpus Inscriptionum Latinarum (CIL). The Academy considered that as a French institution it was best placed to collate the whole of Semitic epigraphy, due to France's then domination of North Africa, its historic relations with Egypt, Syria, and Greece, the numerous Semitic monuments in French museums, and the number of leading French Semitic scholars including Jean-Jacques Barthélemy who first deciphered the Phoenician script.

It was decided that the collection should contain all the ancient inscriptions written in "Semitic characters", excluding the Semitic cuneiform inscriptions and other scripts from the same regions. The time period was unlimited on the furthest age of the inscriptions, whereas the nearest age was to be limited by the beginning of standardized epigraphy of medieval Arabic, Hebrew and Syriac. It was to include all known inscriptions, engraved stones, coins and papyri, along with selected specimens of particularly important later manuscripts.

The original plan of the work to produce ten books:

- I. Phoenician and Punic;
- II. Hebrew and Samaritan, facsimiles of ancient Hebrew and Samaritan manuscripts;
- III Aramaic;
- IV. Palmyrene inscriptions
- V. Nabatean inscriptions;
- VI. Syriac;
- VII. Mandaic;
- VIII. early Arabic;
- IX. Himyaritic;
- X. Amharic language

The program was then divided into five parts, based on the dividing names used in Semitic palaeography. Within each part it was to be subdivided based on geographic location:

- Part I. Phoenician, Punic and neo-Punic inscriptions;
- Part II. Aramaic, Palmyra, Nabatean inscriptions;
- Part III. Hebrew inscriptions;
- Part IV. Himyaritic, Sabaean;
- Part V. Saracen, Lihyan, Safaitic and Thamudic.

The Répertoire d'Épigraphie Sémitique (abbreviated RES) published inscriptions during intermediate periods.

== Volumes ==
Corpus Inscriptionum ab Academia Inscriptionum et Litterarum Humaniorum conditum atque Digestum. Parisiis: E Reipublicae Typographeo, 1881–1962

Part I. Phoenician, Punic and neo-Punic inscriptions. This series brought together the Phoenician inscriptions found in Phoenicia itself, in Cyprus, in Egypt, in Greece, in Malta, in Sicily, in Sardinia, in Italy, in Gaul, in Spain, and in particular the vast number of North African Punic inscriptions, particularly from Carthage. Renan continued to edit this series until his death in 1892.

| Description (text) | | | | | | Tabulae (images) | | | |
|---|---|---|---|---|---|---|---|---|---|
| Tomus | Fasc. | Year | Link | Inscriptions | Pages | Year | Link | Inscriptions | Tables |
| 1 | 1 | 1881 | Link | I 1–164 | p. 1-216 | 1881 | Link | I 1–437 | I-XIV |
| 1 | 2 | 1883 | Link | I 1–164 | p. 1-216 | 1883 | Link | I 1–437 | XV-XXXVI |
| 1 | 3 | 1885 | Link | I 1–437 | p. 1-456 | 1885 | Link | I 1–437 | XXXVII-XLIX |
| 1 | 4 | 1887 | Link | I 1–437 | p. 1-456 | 1887 | Link | I 1–437 | L-LVII |
| 2 | 1 | 1890 | Link | I 438–906 | p. 1-112 | 1890 | | I 438–918 | I-XI |
| 2 | 2 | 1899 | Link | I 906–1901 | p. 113-272 | 1899 | Link | I 919–1899 | XII-XXXVI |
| 2 | 3 | 1908 | Link | I 1902–2592 | p. 273-416 | 1908 | Link | I 1902–2603 | XXXVII-LIV |
| 2 | 4 | 1911 | Link | I 2593–3251 | p. 417-583 | 1911 | | | LV-LXVIII |
| 3 | 1 | 1926 | | | p. 1-160 | 1926 | Link | I 3252–3905 | I-XXIII |
| 3 | 2 | 1947 | | I 3915–5260 | p. 161-400 | 1952 | | | XXIV-LXXXIX |
| 3 | 3 | 1962 | | | p. 401-537 | 1962 | | I 4013-6000 | XC-CXVIII |

Part II. Aramaic, Palmyra, Nabatean inscriptions. Edited by Eugène-Melchior de Vogüé, this series began publication in 1889, covering the territory of the ancient Syrian kingdoms, as well as all the countries where Aramaic penetrated under the Persian empire, from Anatolia to the India, from the Caspian to Upper Egypt.

| Description (text) | | | | | | Tabulae | | | |
|---|---|---|---|---|---|---|---|---|---|
| Tomus | Fasc. | Year | Link | Inscriptions | Pages | Year | Link | Inscriptions | Tables |
| 1 | 1 | 1889 | Link | II 1–149 | p. 1-168 | 1889 | Link | II 1–1471 | I-XIX |
| | 2 | 1893 | Link | II 150–348 | p. 169-304 | 1893 | Link | II 1–1471 | XX-XLIV |
| | 3 | 1902 | Link | II 349–1471 | p. 305-489 | 1902 | Link | II 1–1471 | XLV-CVI |
| 2 | 1 | 1907 | Link | II 1472–3233 | p. 1-215 | 1906 | Link | II 1472–3233 | I-LXX |
| | 2 | | | | | | | | |
| 3 | 1 | 1926 | | | p. 1-336 | 1951 | Link | II 3901-4211 | I-XXXIII |
| | 2 | 1947 | | | p. 337-484 | 1954 | | | XXXIV-LXIII |

Part III. Hebrew inscriptions; this series was not published. However, a number of Hebrew inscriptions were systematically published in the Répertoire d'Épigraphie Sémitique.

Part IV. Himyaritic, Sabaean. This volume, first published in 1889, was edited by Joseph Derenbourg. It covers the Arabian Peninsula, particularly the Himyarite and Sabean inscriptions.

| Description (text) | | | | | | Tabulae | | | |
|---|---|---|---|---|---|---|---|---|---|
| Tomus | Fasc. | Year | Link | Inscriptions | Pages | Year | Link | Inscriptions | Tables |
| 1 | 1 | 1889 | Link | IV 1–362 | p. 1-448 | 1889 | Link | IV 1–362 | I-XII |
| | 2 | 1892 | Link | IV 1–362 | p. 1-448 | 1892 | Link | IV 1–362 | XIII-XVIII |
| | 3 | 1900 | Link | IV 1–362 | p. 1-448 | 1900 | Link | IV 1–362 | XIX-XXVII |
| | 4 | 1908 | Link | IV 1–362 | p. 1-448 | 1908 | Link | IV 1–362 | XXVIII-XLII |
| 2 | 1 | 1911 | | | p. 1-91 | 1911 | Link | IV 363–412 | I-VII |
| | 2 | 1914 | | | | 1914 | Link | IV 413–491 | VIII-XVII |
| | 3 | 1920 | | | p. 193-300 | 1920 | Link | IV 492–595 | XVIII-XXXV |
| | 4 | 1920 | | | p. 301-390 | 1920 | Link | IV 492–595 | XVIII-XXXV |
| 3 | 1 | 1929 | | | p. 1-219 | 1930 | Link | IV 596–928 | XXXVI-LII |
| | 2 | 1931 | | | p. 219-376 | 1932 | Link | IV 930–985 | LIII-LIX |

Part V. Saracen, Lihyan, Safaitic and Thamudic; this series was not published until 1950, by Gonzague Ryckmans

- Pars 5, Tomus 1, Fasc 1: (1950) p. 1-656 (Tabulae 1951, I-CIII)

=== Répertoire d'Épigraphie Sémitique ===
- Volume 1: Corpus Inscriptionum Semiticarum (1900–05) [= inscriptions RES 1-500] under the direction of Charles Simon Clermont-Ganneau, as assistant to Jean-Baptiste Chabot
- Volume 2: Corpus Inscriptionum Semiticarum (1907–14) [= RES 501-1200] edited by Jean-Baptiste Chabot
- Volume 3: Corpus Inscriptionum Semiticarum (1916) [= RES 1201-1510] edited by Jean-Baptiste Chabot
- Volume 4: Corpus Inscriptionum Semiticarum [= RES 1511-2623]
- Volume 5: Corpus Inscriptionum Semiticarum (1929) [= RES 2624-3052] edited by Jean-Baptiste Chabot
- Volume 6: Corpus Inscriptionum Semiticarum (1935) [= RES 3053-3946] edited by Jean-Baptiste Chabot
- Volume 7: Corpus Inscriptionum Semiticarum (1950) [= RES 3947-5106]
- Volume 8: Corpus Inscriptionum Semiticarum (1968) [= tables for volumes 5, 6, 7]

== Leadership ==
List of presidents of the "Commission du Corpus Inscriptionum Semiticarum":

- Ernest Renan (d.1892)
- Hartwig Derenbourg (d.1908)
- René Dussaud (d.1958)
- Jean-Baptiste Chabot (d.1948)
- André Dupont-Sommer (d.1983)
- André Caquot (d.2004)

== Gallery ==
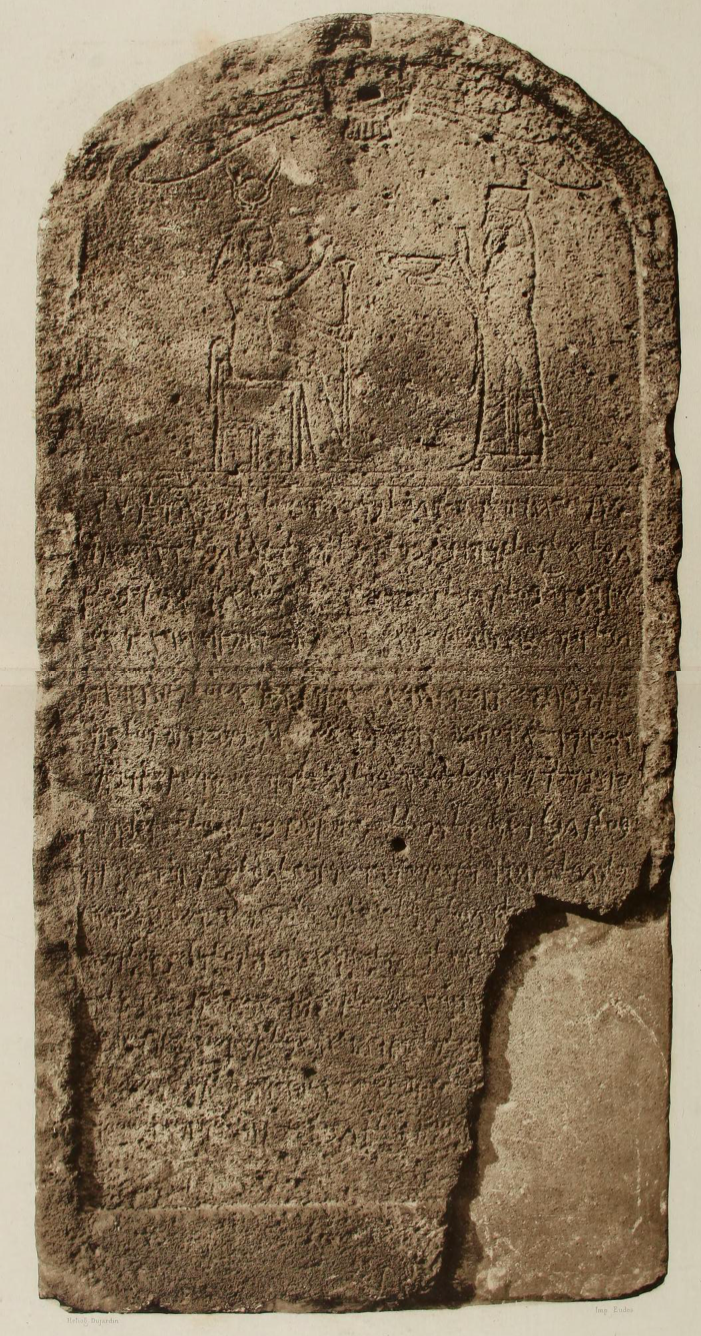
CIS I 1: Yehawmilk Stele

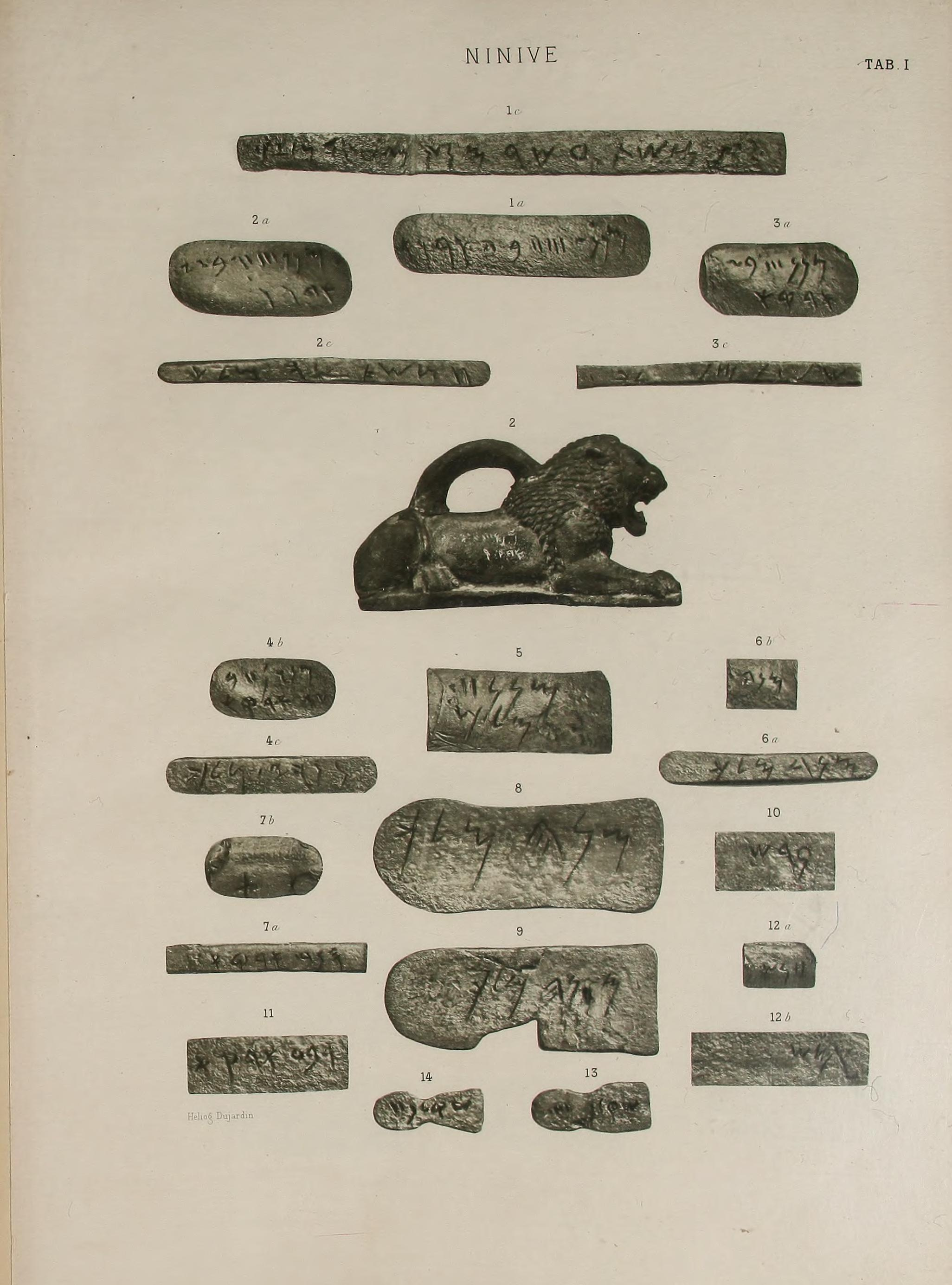
CIS II 1: Assyrian lion weights

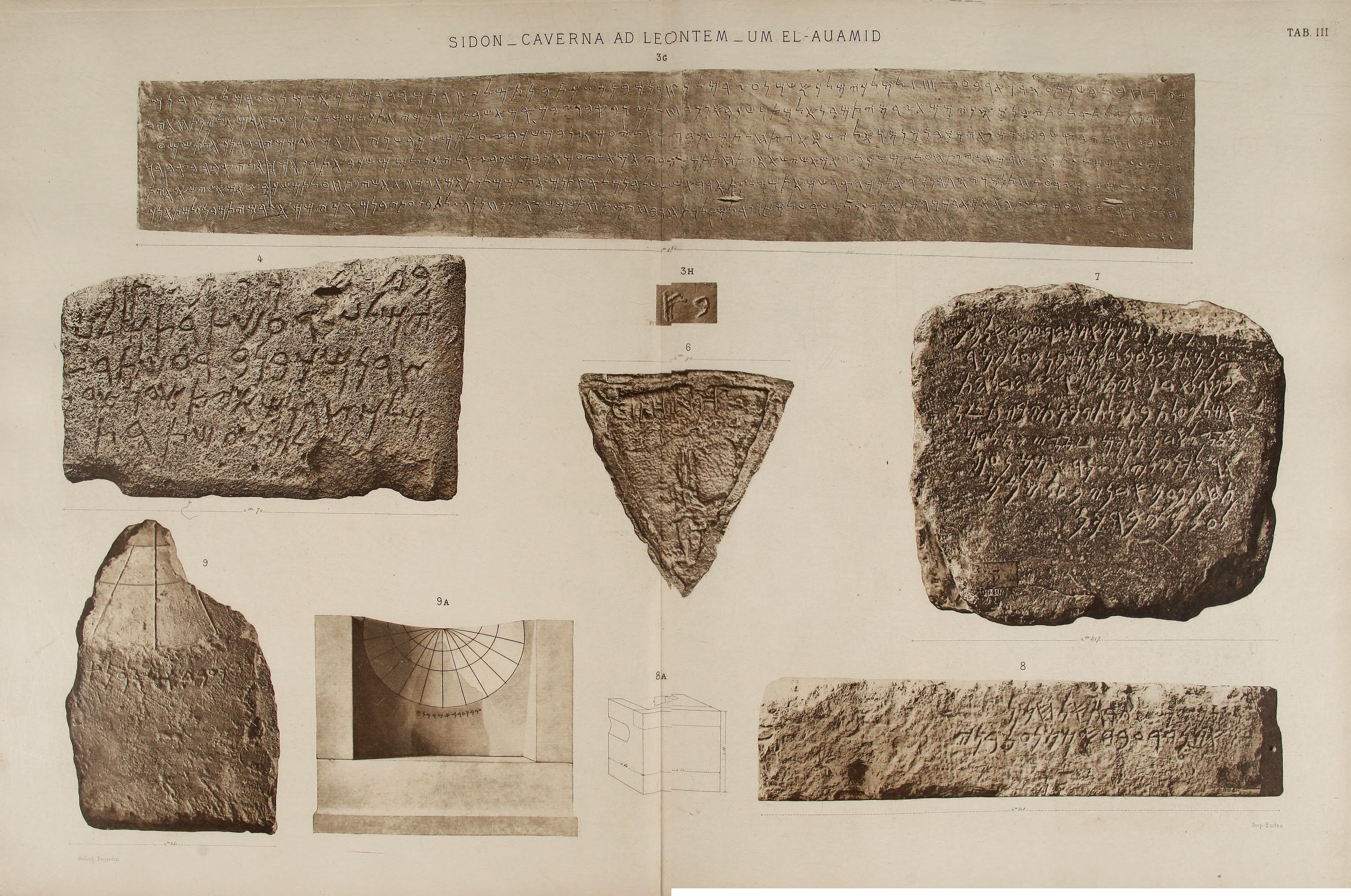
CIS I 3-4 and 6-9: the Sarcophagus of Eshmunazar II, the Bodashtart inscriptions, the Baal Lebanon inscription, the Baalshamin inscription, the Umm al-Amad votive inscription and the Phoenician sun dial

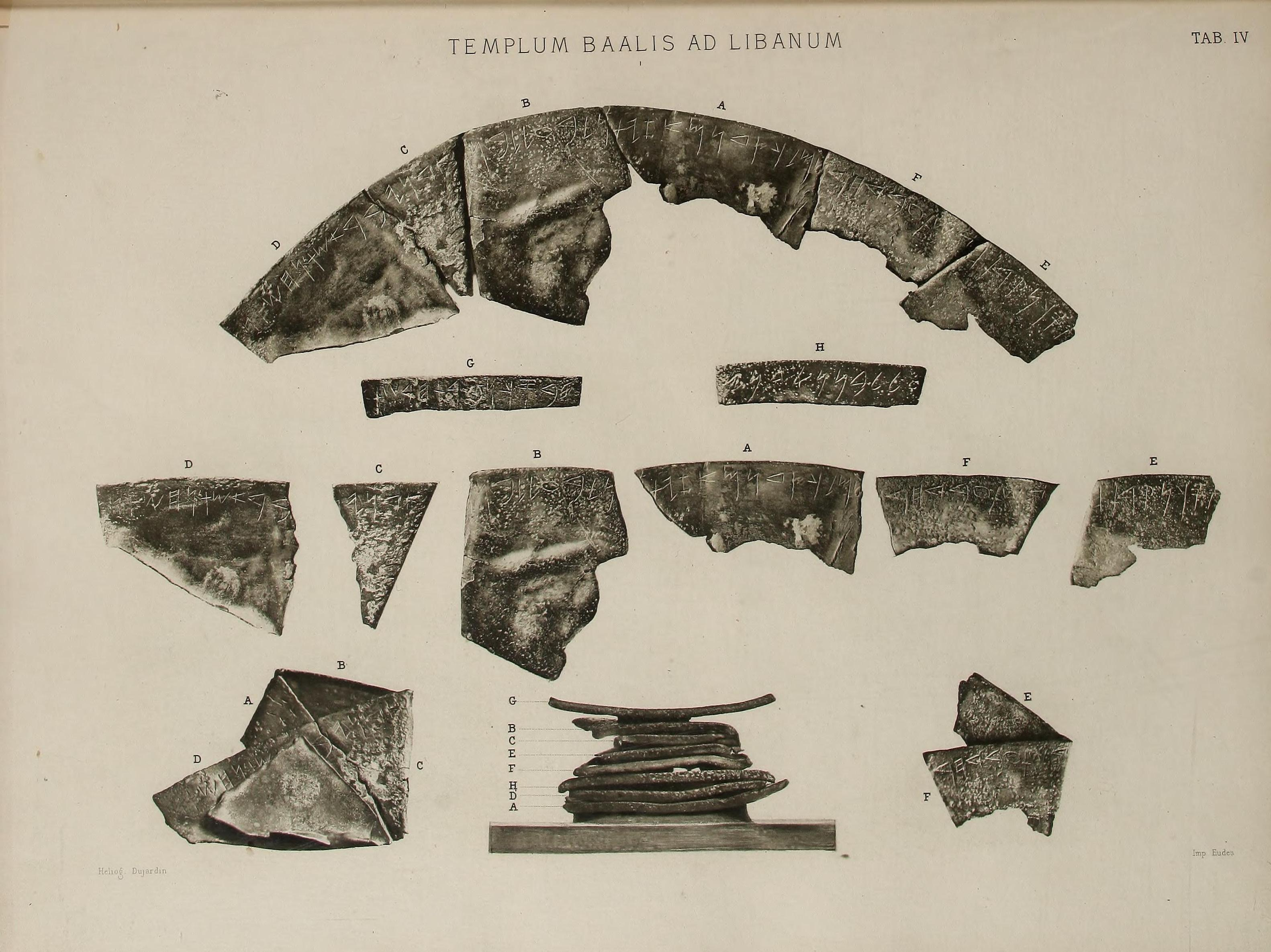
CIS I 5: Baal Lebanon inscription

== See also ==
- Canaanite and Aramaic inscriptions
- Kanaanäische und Aramäische Inschriften
- Corpus Inscriptionum Iudaeae/Palaestinae
- Corpus Inscriptionum Judaeorum
