= Arthur Ernest Cowley =

British librarian (1861–1931)

Sir Arthur Ernest Cowley, FBA (13 December 1861 – 12 October 1931) was a British librarian who was Bodley's Librarian (head of the Bodleian Library at the University of Oxford) from 1919 until a couple of months before his death. He was also a leading Semitic scholar.

== Early life and career ==
Cowley was the fourth son (and one of seventeen children) of a customs house agent and his wife from Sydenham in South London. He studied at St Paul's School and Trinity College, Oxford, where ill-health and an interest in oriental languages impaired his study of the classics, and he obtained only a fourth-class degree. He then studied in Switzerland to improve his French and German, before teaching modern languages at Sherborne School then Magdalen College School (1885 to 1889 and 1890 to 1895 respectively).

Cowley worked with Alfred Neubauer, sub-librarian at the Bodleian Library, from 1890 onwards on the Samaritan liturgy; the results were published in two volumes in 1909. He was appointed assistant sub-librarian in 1896. Together, Cowley and Neubauer published The Original Hebrew of a Portion of Ecclesiasticus (1897) and Facsimiles of the Fragments Hitherto Recovered of the Book of Ecclesiasticus in Hebrew (1901) as well as the Catalogue of the Hebrew Manuscripts in the Bodleian Library (1906). When Neubauer left the Bodleian in 1899, Cowley became sub-librarian and also taught rabbinical Hebrew literature as well as working on a catalogue of the library's Sanskrit collections and (with Neubauer) the second volume of the library's catalogue of Hebrew manuscripts. He was appointed as a Fellow of Magdalen College, Oxford, in May 1902, and was awarded a D.Litt. by the university in 1908. In 1912 he gave the annual Sandars Lectures in bibliography at the University of Cambridge, choosing as his subject the Elephantine papyri.

== Bodley's Librarian ==
He returned to Oxford as Bodley's Librarian, succeeding Falconer Madan, in 1919 (the year in which he was appointed as a Fellow of the British Academy). He abandoned, for reasons of expense, the publication of the catalogue of printed books and began a new catalogue on printed slips for post-1919 publications. He worked towards a united management system for the libraries of the university, with the Bodleian taking over other libraries as dependent institutions. In 1923, a Bodleian assistant librarian was placed in charge of the law library; in 1927, the Radcliffe Library and Indian Institute Library were annexed to the Bodleian; and in 1929 the library of Rhodes House was inaugurated. Space for acquisitions was a perennial problem; coins and engraved portraits were transferred to the Ashmolean Museum, and Cowley's preferred option of an extension to the Bodleian opposite its main site was eventually accepted just before he retired.

During his time as Bodley's Librarian, he continued to pursue his own research interests, and was regarded as one of the leading Semitic scholars of the time. In 1923 he published The Aramaic Papyri of the Fifth Century, a revision of his 1906 work, incorporating the critical results of the best-known Semitic scholars, his original text largely unaltered. He translated from German into English the last complete significant edition of Wilhelm Gesenius' Hebrew grammar, revised by Emil Kautzsch; this edition is still widely used in Hebrew language studies around the world in the 21st century.

== Illness and death ==
Cowley had an operation in May 1931 to remove a tumour. He convalesced in hospital until early August. He was awarded a knighthood in June, and resigned from the Bodleian on grounds of ill-health on 31 July. He suffered a stroke in Eastbourne during his recovery, and a second stroke after his return to Oxford, where he died on 12 October 1931. The bulk of his estate was left to the university for the use of the Bodleian. He had married in 1913, and had adopted two sons. He left a reputation of having been a "great pioneer" of Elephantine studies.

== Works ==
- Gesenius' Hebrew Grammar, edited and enlarged by Emil Kautzsch, translated from German by Arthur Ernest Cowley
- "The Aramaic Papyri of the Fifth Century". Oxford: The Clarendon Press. 1923. Edited, with translation and notes. By A. Cowley
