= Ivan Abamelik =

Ivan Abamelik Իվան Աբամելիք
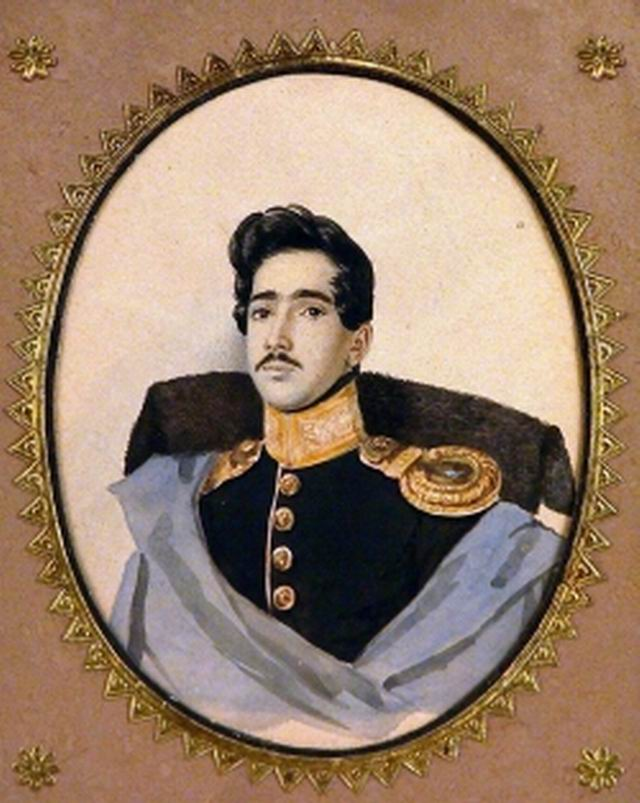
- Native name: Իվան Սիմեոնի Աբամելիք
- Born: January 7, 1768; Tbilisi, Kingdom of Kartli-Kakheti
- Died: August 23, 1828 (aged 60) Saint Petersburg, Russian Empire
- Rank: Major general
- Conflicts: War of the Third Coalition; Battle of Austerlitz; Battle of Guttstadt-Deppen; War of the Sixth Coalition; French invasion of Russia; Battle of Borodino; Battle of Paris (1814)
- Awards: Order of St. George, 4th degree, Order of St. Anna 1st degree, Golden Weapon for Bravery; Order of the Red Eagle

Ivan Semeonovich Abamelik ( January 7, 1768, Tbilisi, Kingdom of Kartli-Kakheti - August 23, 1828, Saint Petersburg, Russian Empire ), was an Armenian nobleman in the Russian Empire, Major general of lejb-guards of artillery (1817), chief of arsenals in Kiev and St. Petersburg.

He was elder brother of David Abamelik, from the noble family of Abamelik.

== Biography ==
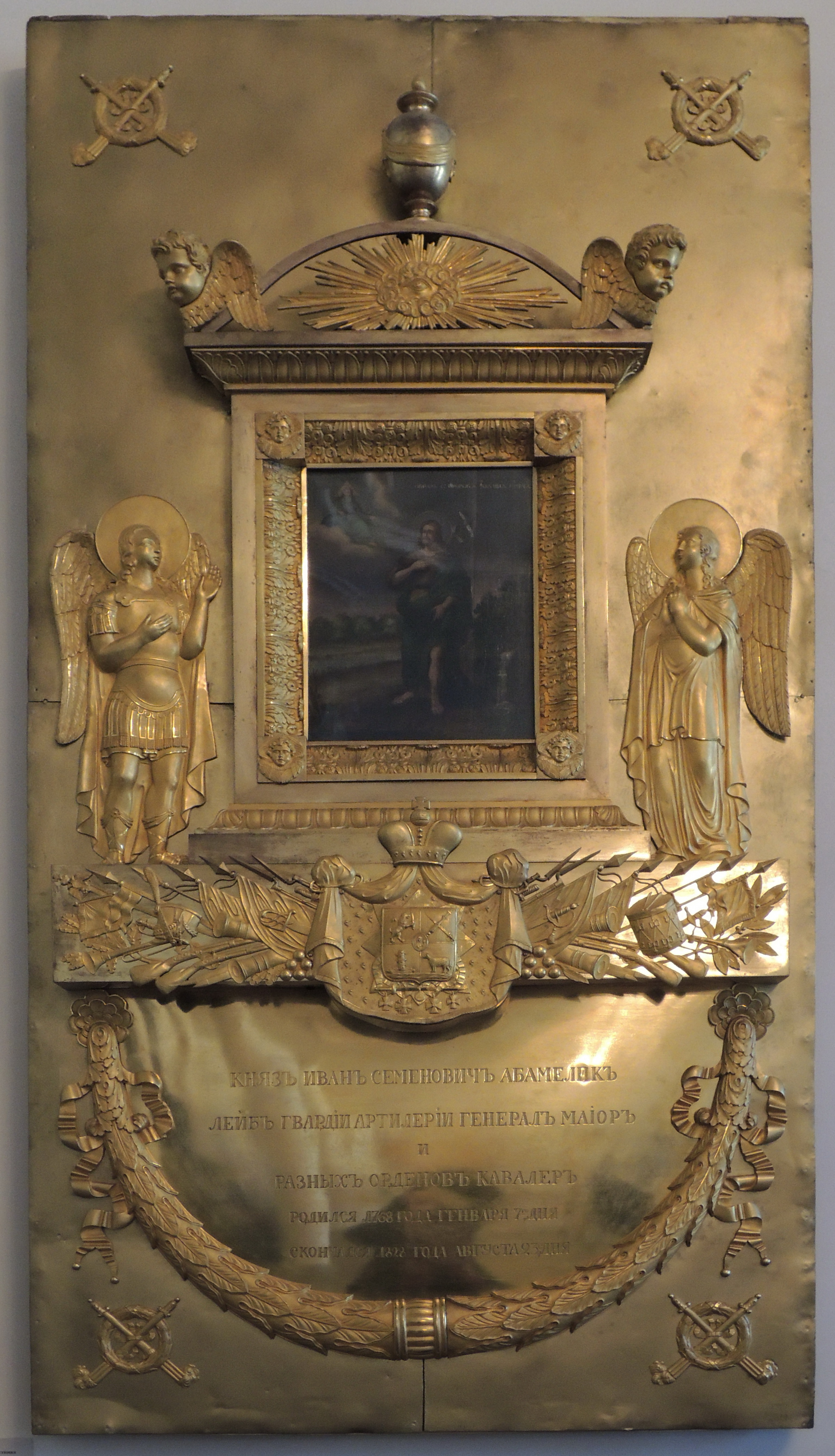
Ivan Semenovich Abamelik tombstone.

He was born on January 7, 1768, in Tbilisi.

=== Family ===
- Father - Abamelik Simon (1743-1815).
- Brother - Abamelik David (1774-1833) married to Marfa Ekimovna Lazareva (1788-1844) niece of Ivan Lazarevich Lazarev.
- Brother - Abamelik Zakhar.
- Brother - Abamelik George - Captain.
- Brother - Abamelik Peter - Colonel, participant of the French invasion of Russia.
- Brother - Abamelik Alexander.
- Sister - Elene (1770–1836) married to Georgian crown prince David Bagrationi.

=== Military service ===
He was married to Sophie Yegorovna. During the French invasion of Russia against Napoleon I, he distinguished himself in the Battle of Austerlitz and Borodino, he also took part in the Russian invasion of France in 1814, and entered Paris. He was the head of the arsenals of Kiev and St. Petersburg. He studied gun casting in Berlin and did significant work in the field of improving Russian artillery. He died on August 23, 1828, in St. Petersburg at the age of 60, and was buried in the Church of the Resurrection of Christ at the Smolensk Armenian Cemetery. He was awarded the Order of St. George, 4th class (December 16, 1821) and St. Anna, 1st class, as well as the Golden Weapon for Bravery (April 12, 1808).
