= David Semyonovich Abamelik =

Russian-Armenian general-major

David Semyonovich Abamelek Դավիթ Սիմեոնի Աբամելիք
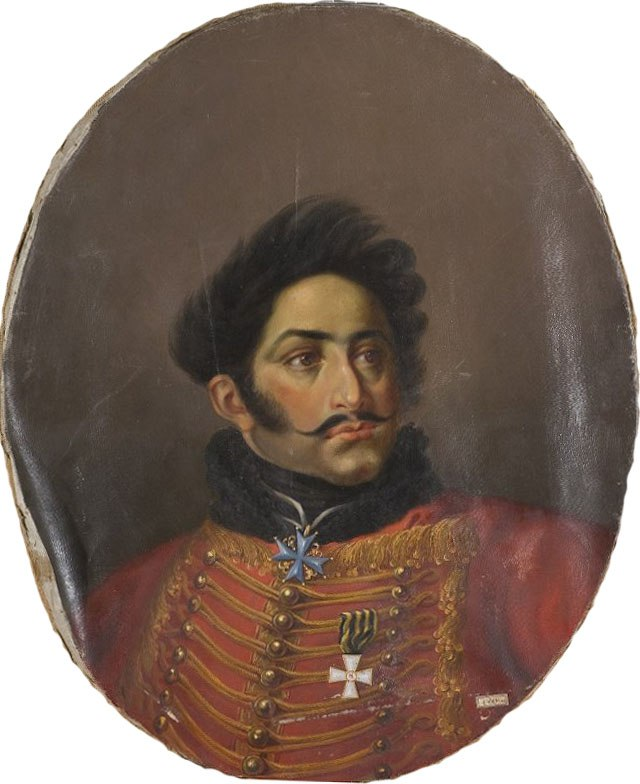

Personal details
- Born: 10(21) March 1774
- Died: 23 October(4 November) 1833 Dresden
- Awards: Order of St. George Order of Saint Vladimir, Order of St. Anna twice, Pour le Mérite

Military service
- Allegiance: Russian Empire
- Branch/service: (Russian Empire) Imperial Russian Army; Cavalry
- Rank: general-major
- Battles/wars: War of the Third Coalition War of the Fourth Coalition War of the Sixth Coalition

David Semyonovich Abamelek (1774–1833) was a Russian-Armenian principal, general-major (1818) from the noble Abamelik family. He participated to the wars against Napoleon I (1805–1807 and 1812). Abamelek was awarded the Order of St. Anna with brilliants.

The brother of Ivan Abamelik, from the noble family of Abamelik.

== Family ==
- Marfa Ekimovna Lazareva (1788-1844), wife. Daughter of Ekim Lazarevich Lazarev (1743-1826).
- Anna Davidovna Abamelek (1814-1889), daughter.
- Semyon Davidovich Abamelek-Lazarev (1815-1888), son.
  - Semyon Semyonovich Abamelek-Lazarev (1857-1916), grandson.
- Ekaterina Davidovna Abamelek (1817-1892), daughter.
- Ekim Davidovich Abamelek (1822-1885), son.
- Artemy Davidovich Abamelek (1823-1885), son.
- Sofia Davidovna Abamelek (1828-1899), daughter.

== Sources ==
- Armenian Concise Encyclopedia, Ed. by acad. K. Khudaverdian, Yerevan, 1990, Vol. 1, p. 8
- Armenian Soldiers in the Russian (Prerevolutionary) and Soviet Army
