= Marseille Tariff =

3rd-century BC Punic inscription

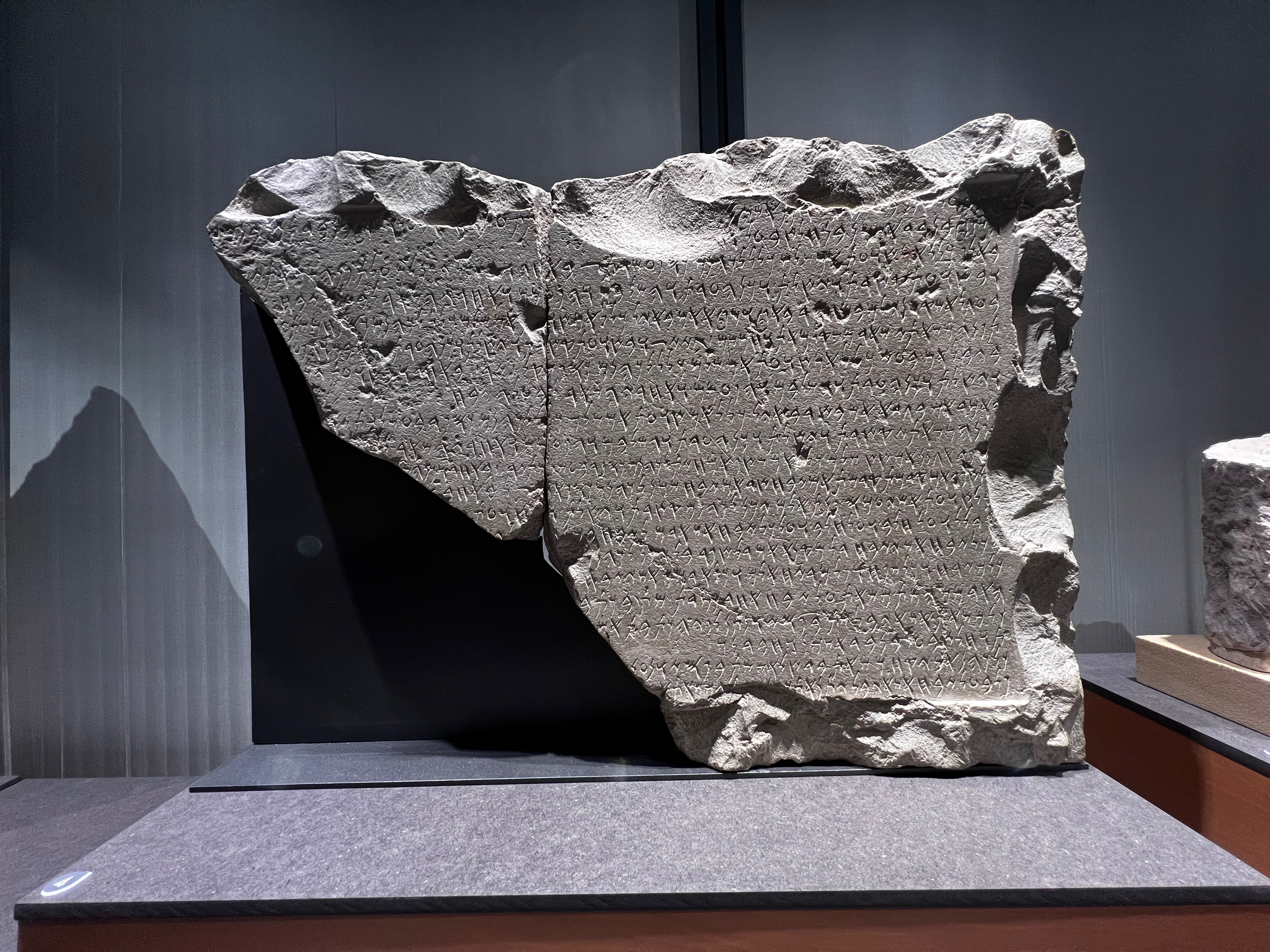
- On display at the Musée d'archéologie méditerranéenne, Marseille
- Material: Stone
- Created: 3rd century BCE
- Discovered: June 1845; Marseille, Bouches-du-Rhone, France
- Language: Punic

The Marseille Tariff is a Punic language inscription from the third century BCE, found on two fragments of a stone in June 1845 at Marseille in Southern France. It is thought to have originally come from the temple of Baal Hammon in Carthage. It is one of the earliest published inscriptions written in the Phoenician alphabet, and one of the longest ever found.

It was first published by Jean-Joseph-Léandre Bargès, and is known as KAI 69 and CIS I 165.

It is held on display in Marseille at the Musée d'archéologie méditerranéenne.

== Discovery ==
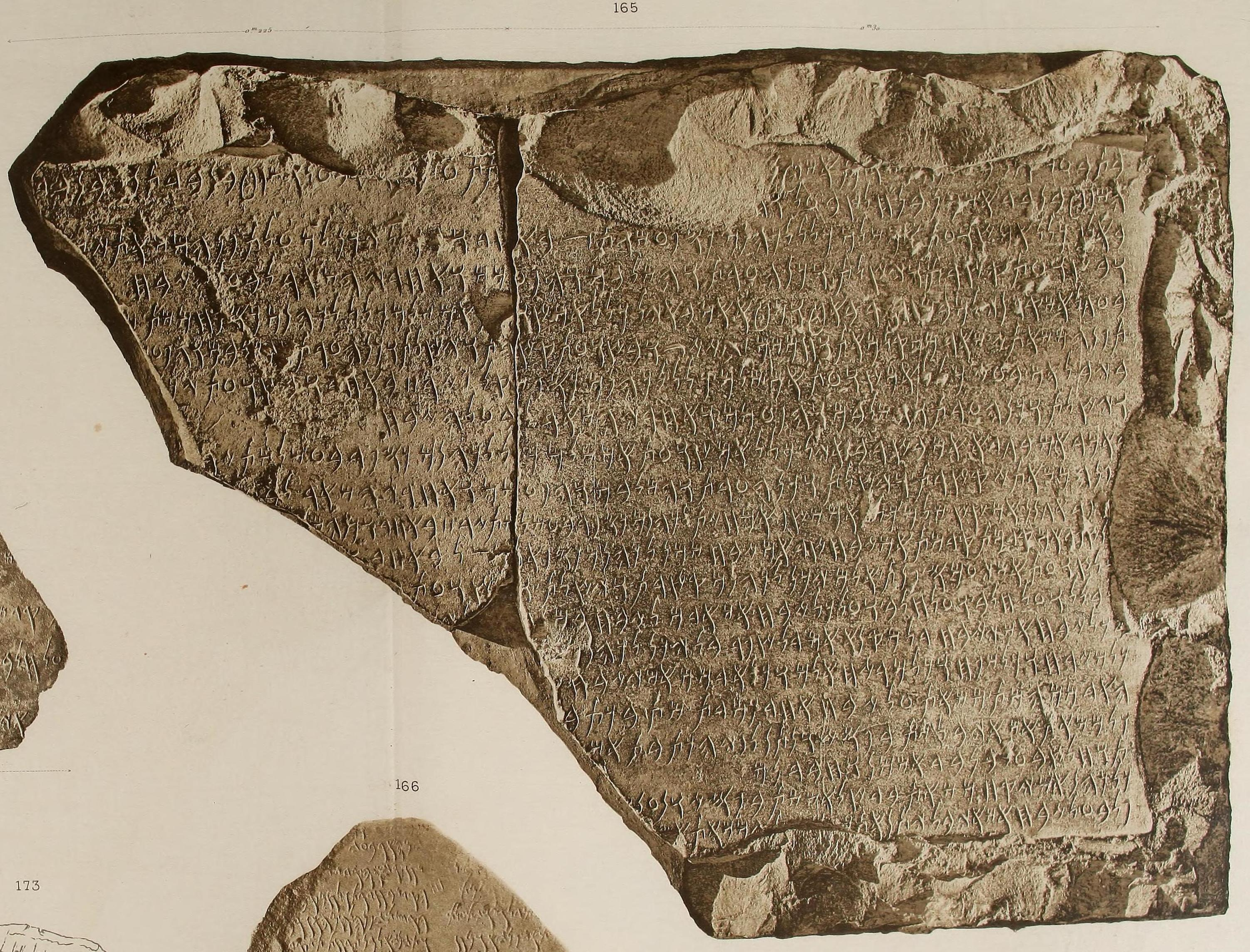
As shown in the Corpus Inscriptionum Semiticarum

In June 1845, workers demolishing a house in the old town of Marseille, not far from the Marseille Cathedral, found two fragments of an inscription in the rubble. The inscription was said to be engraved on Pierre de Cassis, such that it was considered to have been locally produced. The mason offered the stones to the director of the museum, who immediately purchased them for ten francs. The French newspapers announced that the text discovered was of such perfect preservation and of such length that no other Phoenician epigraphic monuments then known could compete in importance with this one.

Modern chemical analysis of the stone has shown that its place of origin is Carthage. The first two words of the inscription tell us that it originally was part of a temple of the important god Baal Hammon. The two suffetes mentioned in lines 1-2 and 18-19 of the inscription, who both bore the name Ḥaloṣba‘al (meaning "Ba‘al rescues"), apparently were the eponymous magistrates of the city in the year the inscription was made. The suffetes are comparable with the two eponymous consuls in Rome.

== The inscription ==
The tariff regulated the payments to the priests for performing sacrifices and described the nature of the victims. All victims are male animals, and females are not mentioned.

The inscription reads:

(line 1)	BT B‘L B‘[T HMŠ]’TT ’Š ṬN[’ ŠLŠM H’Š ’Š ‘L HMŠ’]TT	Temple of Ba‘al. (This is) the tari[ff of pay]ments (for sacrifices) that [the Thirty Men who are in charge of Tariffs se]t up
(1-2)	‘T [R ḤLṢ]B‘L HŠPṬ BN BDTNT BN BD[’ŠMN WḤLṢB‘L] / HŠPṬ BN BD’ŠMN BN ḤLṢB‘L WḤ[BRNM]	in the time of [the magistrates Ḥaloṣ]ba‘al the Suffes, son of Bodtinnīt, (grand)son of Bod[’esmūn, and Ḥaloṣba‘al] / the Suffes, son of Bodesmūn, (grand)son of Ḥaloṣba‘al, and their coll[eagues.]
(3)	B’LP KLL ’M ṢW‘T ’M ŠLM KLL LKHNM KSP ‘ŠRT 10 B’ḤD	For an entire ox, either cut in pieces or entirely intact, the priests shall receive ten 10 silver pieces for each (animal);
(3-4)	WBKLL YKN LM ‘LT PN HMŠ’T Z Š[’R MŠQL ŠLŠ M’T 300] / WBṢW‘T QṢRT WYṢLT	and for an entire (animal), there shall be for them (they shall receive) in addition to this payment m[eat weighing three hundred 300], / and of the cut-up parts (of the animal) the QṢRT (breast?) and the joints (shall be for the priests).
(4)	WKN H‘RT WHŠLBM WHP‘MM W’ḤRY HŠ’R LB‘L HZBḤ	But the skin and the ŠLBM and the feet (legs?) and the rest of the meat shall be for the sacrificer.
(5)	B‘GL ’Š QRNY LMBMḤSR B’ṬWMṬ’ ’M B’YL KLL ’M ṢW[‘T] ’M ŠLM KLL LKHNM KSP ḤMŠT [ 5 B’ḤD	For a calf whose horns are in absence on (its) head (i.e., not yet grown), or for an entire ram, whether cut in pieces or entirely intact, the priests shall receive five silver pieces [ 5 for each (animal);
(5-6)	WBKLL YKN LM ‘L]/T PN HMŠ’T Z Š’R MŠQL M’T WḤMŠM 150 WBṢW‘T QṢRT WYṢLT	and for an entire (animal), there will be for them in addi]/tion to this payment meat weighing one hundred and fifty 150, and of the cut-up parts (of the animal) the QṢRT and the joints.
(6)	WKN H‘RT WHŠLBM WHP‘[MM W’ḤRY HŠ’R LB‘L HZBḤ]	But the skin and the ŠLBM and the le[gs and the rest of the meat shall be for the sacrificer.]
(7)	BYBL ’M B‘Z KLL ’M ṢW‘T ’M ŠLM KLL LKHNM KSP ŠQL 1 ZR 2 B’ḤD	For an entire ram or goat, whether cut in pieces or entirely intact, the priests shall receive 1 silver piece (and) 2 handful from each (animal);
(7-8)	WBṢW‘T YK[N LM ‘LT PN HMŠ’T Z QṢRT] / WYṢLT	and of the cut-up parts (of the animal) there will b[e for them in addition to this payment, the QṢRT] / and the joints.
(8)	WKN H‘RT WHŠLBM WHP‘MM W’ḤRY HŠ’R LB‘L HZBḤ	But the skin and the ŠLBM and the legs and the rest of the meat shall be for the sacrificer.
(9)	B’MR ’M BGD’ ’M BṢRB ’YL KLL ’M ṢW‘T ’M ŠLM K[L]L LKHNM KSP RB‘ ŠLŠT ZR [ 2 B’ḤD	For a sheep or for a young goat or for an entire young ram(?), whether cut in pieces or en[ti]rely intact, the priests shall receive (1) silver piece (and) three-quarter handful from each (animal);
(9-10)	WBṢW‘T YKN LM ‘L/T] / PN HMŠ’T Z QṢRT WYṢLT	and of the cut-up parts (of the animal), there will be for them in addi]tion / to this payment the QṢRT and the joints.
(10)	WKN H‘RT WHŠLBM WHP‘MM W’ḤRY HŠ’R LB‘L [HZBḤ]	But the skin and the ŠLBM and the legs and the rest of the meat shall be for the sacrif[icer.]
(11)	[BṢ]PR ’GNN ’M ṢṢ ŠLM KL[L] ’M ŠṢP ’M ḤZT LKHNM KSP RB‘ ŠLŠT ZR 2 B’ḤD WKN HŠ[’R LB‘L HZBḤ]	[For a] ’GNN-bird or a ṢṢ-bird (hawk?) (that is) entirely intact, or (for) a ŠṢP-bird or ḤZT-bird, the priests shall receive (1) silver piece (and) 2 three-quarter of a handful from each (animal); but the re[st will be for the sacrificer.]
(12)	[‘]L ṢPR ’M QDMT QDŠT ’M ZBḤ ṢD ’M ZBḤ ŠMN LKHNM KSP ’[GRT] 10 LB’ḤD [... ...]	[F]or a bird or a holy QDMT or a sacrifice of game or a sacrifice of oil, the priests (shall receive) 10 silver «’a[gorut]» for each (animal).
(13)	[B]KL ṢW‘T ’Š Y‘MS PNT ’LM YKN LKHNM QṢRT WYṢLT W[B]ṢW‘T [... ...]	[As for] all the cut parts (of an animal) that one shall bring (as an offering) to a god, the QṢRT and the joints shall be for the priests. But [of] the cut parts [...]
(14)	[‘]L BLL W‘L ḤLB W‘L ḤLB W‘L KL ZBḤ ’Š ’DM LZBḤ BMNḤ[T...] Y[KN LKHNM ...]	[F]or fodder and for milk and for fat and for any sacrifice that a person shall sacrifice as a food offerin[g, the priests shall receive ...]
(15)	BKL ZBḤ ’Š YZBḤ DL MQN’ ’M DL ṢPR BL YKN LKHN[M MNM]	Of any sacrifice that a person sacrifices who owns (his own) livestock or fowl, the priests shall receive nothing [thereof].
(16)	KL MZRḤ WKL ŠPḤ WKL MRZḤ ’LM WKL ’DMM ’Š YZBḤ [... ...]	As for any MZRḤ-sodality or any family or any MRZḤ-sodality of a god, or any persons who shall offer [a sacrifice,]
(17)	H’DMM HMT MŠ’T ‘L ZBḤ ’ḤD KMDT ŠT BKTB[T ... ...]	those persons shall pay the payment for each sacrifice in accordance with the amount set down in the documen[ts of the Tariff officials].
(18)	[K]L MŠ’T ’Š ’YBL ŠT BPS Z WNTN LPY HKTBT ’Š [KTB ... ... H’ŠM ’Š ‘L HMŠ’TT	As for any payment that is not set down in this inscription, it shall be paid in accordance with the documents that [were written ... by the Tariff officials
(18-19)	‘T R ḤLṢB‘L BN BDTN]/T WḤLṢB‘L BN BD’ŠMN WḤBRNM	in the time of the magistrates Ḥaloṣba‘al the son of Bodtinnī]/t, and Ḥaloṣba‘al the son of Bodesmūn, and their colleagues.
(20)	KL KHN ’Š YQḤ MŠ’T BDṢ L’Š ŠT BPS Z WN‘N[Š ... ...]	Any priest who shall take a payment in excess of what is set down in this inscription, he shall be fine[d ...]
(21)	KL B‘L ZBḤ ’Š ’YBL YTN ’T K[...]L HMŠ’T ’Š [... ...]	Any sacrificer who shall not pay the fu[ll amoun]t of the payment that is [set down in this inscription, he shall be fined ...]

== Comparison with Leviticus ==
The Marseille Tariff has often been compared with the Jewish rules for sacrifices as given in the Bible book Leviticus 1-7. As Van den Branden has said, "No one will deny that Israel in developing its religious cult has derived elements from Canaanite rites". When Solomon built the First Temple, he closely cooperated with King Hiram of Tyre (I Kings 5-7). Now Tyre was the mother city of Carthage, and Carthage is known to have been conservative in guarding the religious practices of its mother city. Thus the Marseille Tariff can be expected to mirror Canaanite practices.

Similarities exist between the Marseille Tariff and Leviticus. Both give provisions as to what is due to the priests. Also, the order of the offerings, going from large to small animals, and ending with food offerings like cakes or oil, is the same for both. And both make special mention of the hide of the animals. However, their general character is very different: the Marseille Tariff is an economic document, focusing on the fair part that is to be given to both the priest and the sacrificer, while Leviticus is a religious document. In the Leviticus rules, the provisions stating what is due to the priests make up only an extremely minor part (Leviticus 7:30-34), while its extensive subdivision into half a dozen religious categories of offences and corresponding offerings, is completely missing from the Marseille Tariff. Also missing from the Marseille Tariff are meticulous regulations as to how the offerings shall be performed, as in Leviticus 6 and 7.

The difference between an economic and a religious document is relevant for the interpretation of the much debated clause KLL ’M ṢW‘T ’M ŠLM KLL (lines 3, 5, 7, 9), an example of the very common construction

"(kil) X ’im A ’im B (’im C ...)", meaning "every X, whether/either A or B (or C ...)".

Early editors translated the clause in this case as

"X or A or B",

assuming that, in analogy with Leviticus, «KLL», «ṢW‘T», and «ŠLM KLL» were three religiously different kinds of offerings (X, A and B). For example,

"an expiatory offering, or a community offering, or a holocaust offering", or
"a sin offering or a peace offering or a burnt offering".

However, if such a religious interpretation is not presupposed, the much simpler alternative is to translate "entire X (animal), either cut in pieces or entirely intact", with KL/KLL ("all, each, entire") and ŠLM ("whole, complete") having their normal meaning, and where the otherwise unknown word ṢW‘T is assumed from context to mean "dismembered".

== Bibliography ==
- Van den Branden, A. (1965). LÉVITIQUE 1-7 ET LE TARIF DE MARSEILLE, CIS I. 165. Rivista Degli Studi Orientali, 40(2), 107–130. Retrieved August 21, 2020, from http://www.jstor.org/stable/41879572
- Jean-Joseph-Léandre Bargès (1868), Inscription phénicienne de Marseille: nouvelles observations, historique de la découverte et description exacte de la pierre, le tout accompagné de pièces justificatives et d'une planche lithographique
- Jean-Joseph-Léandre Bargès (1847), Temple de Baal à Marseille ou grande inscription phénicienne découverte dans cette ville dans le courant de l'année 1845, expliquée et accompagnée d'observations critiques et historiques

== See also ==
- Palmyra Tariff
- Carthage Tariff
