= Fryanovo =

Fryanovo Фряново
- Urban-type settlement
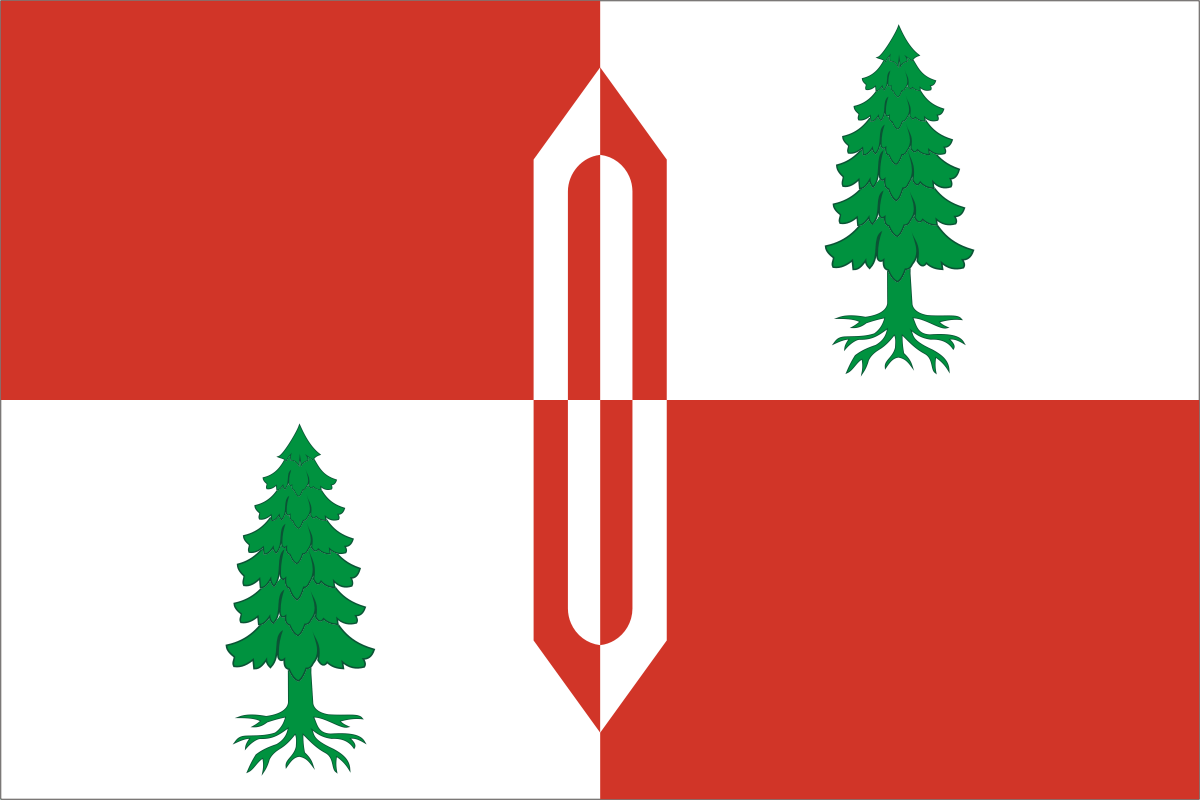
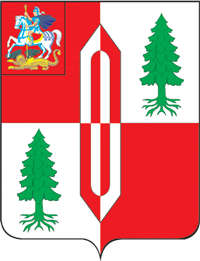
- Flag Coat of arms
- Interactive map of Fryanovo
- Location of Fryanovo Fryanovo (Moscow Oblast)
- Coordinates: 56.1344°N 38.4461°E
- Country: Russia
- Federal subject: Moscow Oblast
- Administrative district: Shchyolkovsky District

Population (2010 Census)
  - Total: 11,243
  - Estimate (2025): 12,368 (+10%)
- Time zone: UTC+3 (MSK)
- Postal code: 141147
- OKTMO ID: 46659163051

Fryanovo (Russian: Фряново) is an urban locality (an urban-type settlement) in Shchyolkovsky District of Moscow Oblast, Russia. Population: 11,243 (2010 census); 11,180 (2002 census); 13,199 (1989 Soviet census). It has grown up around a silk factory which was established in 1735 by the Armenian Lazaryan family.
