= Carthage tower model =

Limestone model of a tower with a Punic inscription from Carthage

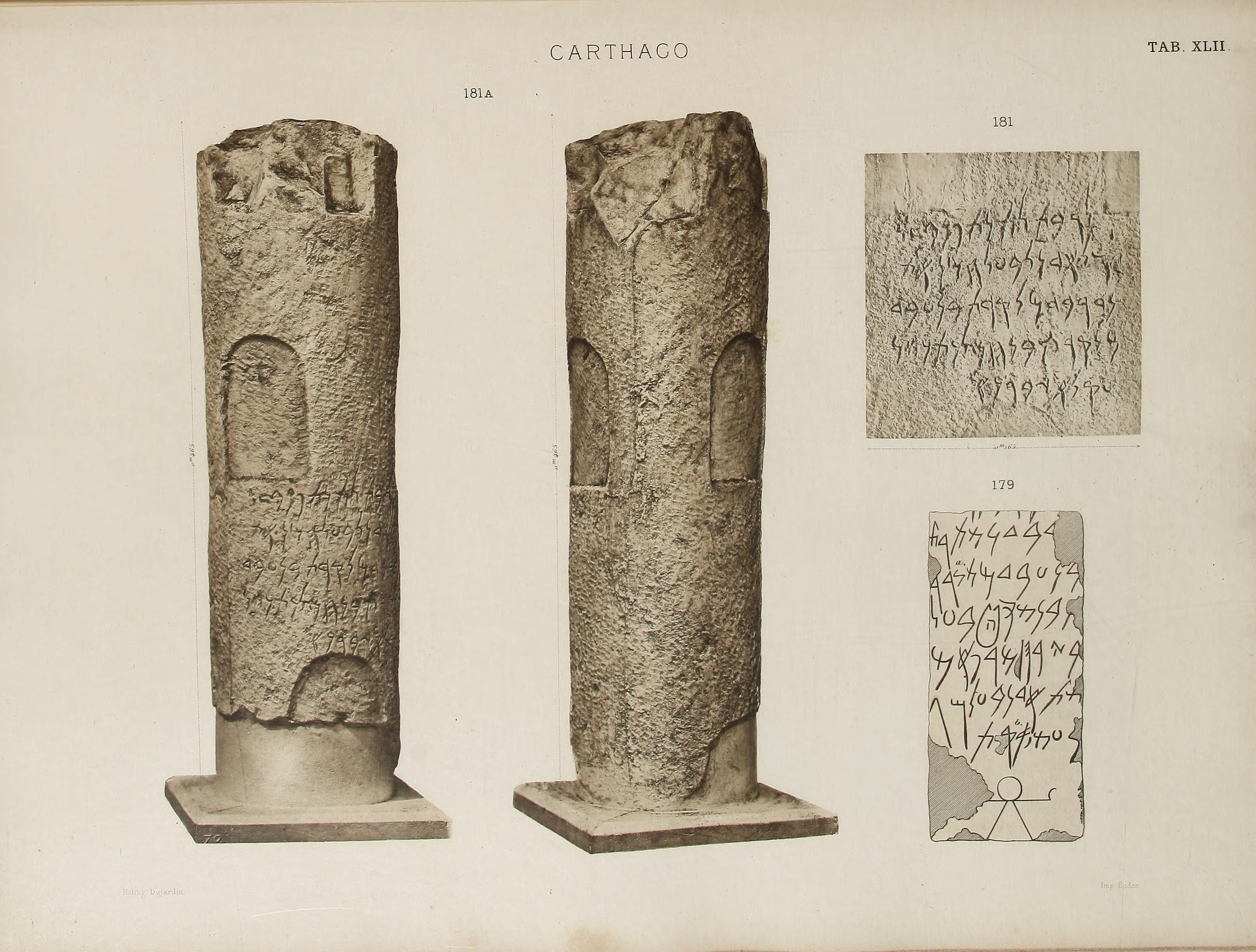
In the Corpus Inscriptionum Semiticarum

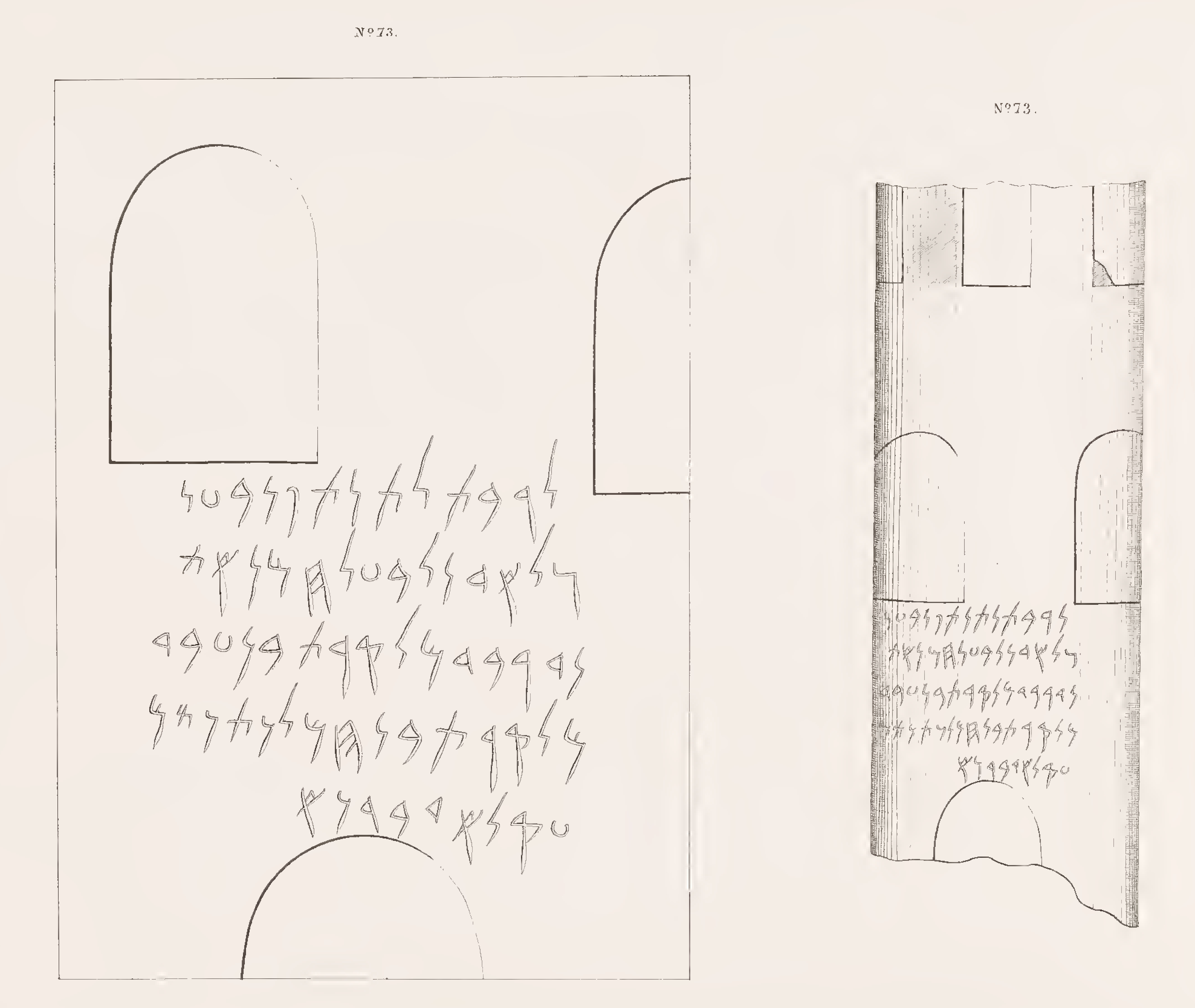
As published by Davis

The Carthage tower model is a limestone model of a tower with a Punic inscription, found in Carthage by Nathan Davis in 1856–58 in Husainid Tunisia.

It has a diameter of 13.3 cm and a height of 41.1 cm. It is in the British Museum, with ID number 125324.

Of all the inscriptions found by Davis, it was one of just three that was not a traditional Carthaginian tombstone - the other two being number 71 (the Son of Baalshillek marble base) and number 90 (the Carthage Tariff), which contained a bevelled architectural ornamentation.

Donald Harden wrote that it may represent a lighthouse or a watch tower, and may provide evidence for a type of multistory building in Carthaginian architecture. The model appears to show three stories, and may have originally been more; the bottom arch is considered to be a door, the middle story contains three shallow round arched windows, and part of a top story with five deeper and narrower windows with their tops missing. CIS wrote that: “The cippus is round, rising in the form of a tower, in the lower part of which is an arched gate, and above it three windows are shaped in the same manner as a vault. The top of the tower is finned.“

The inscription states:

To the lady Tanit face of Baal and to the lord to Baal Hammon which vowed Bodmelqart son of 'Abdmelqart son of Himilkot for he heard his voice, and blessed him.

== Bibliography ==
- "TABULA TITULORUM VOTIVORUM; TANITIDI ET BAALI HAMMONI DICATORUM (180-3251.)". Corpus inscriptionum semiticarum (in Latin). Académie des Inscriptions et Belles-Lettres. 1890.
