= Semyon Abamelek-Lazarev =

Russian archaeologist

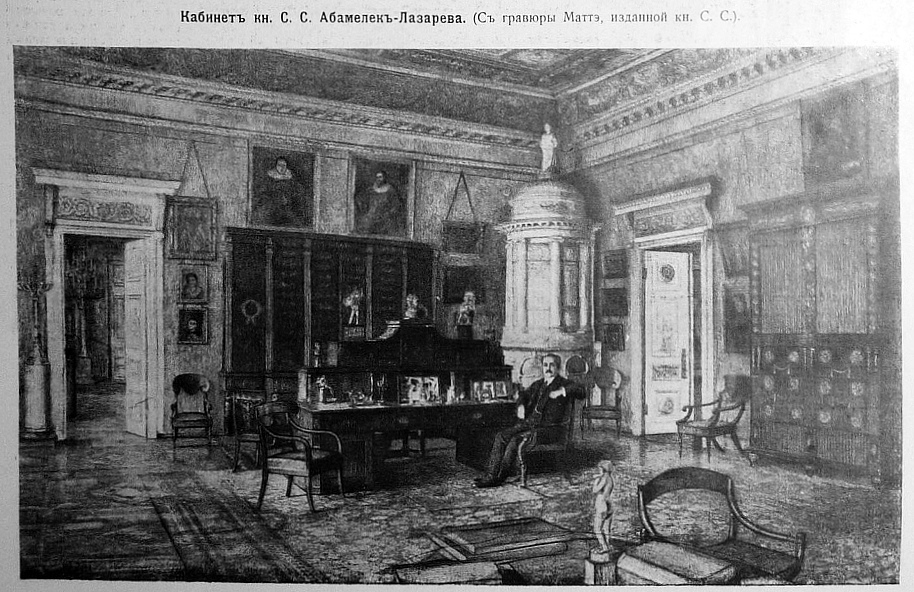
Prince Semyon Abamelek-Lazarev at his study (1915)

Prince Semyon Semyonovich Abamelek-Lazarev (also Abamelik-Lazaryan; Russian: Семён Семёнович Абамелек-Лазарев; 24 November 1857 in Moscow – 2 October 1916 in Kislovodsk) was a Russian millionaire of Armenian ethnicity noted for his contributions to archaeology and geology.

== Biography ==
His father, Prince Semyon Abamelek (1815–1888) was a Major General of the Russian army and an amateur painter. He married his first cousin, Elizaveta Christophorovna Lazareva (1832–1904), the last of her family and the heiress to an enormous fortune. She was the granddaughter of Manuc Bei and the grand-niece of Count Ivan Lazarevich Lazarev (a court banker to Catherine the Great). Prince Semyon inherited her steel mills in the Urals, her surname and the right to manage the Lazarev Institute of Oriental Languages.

After attending the Saint-Petersburg University, Abamelek-Lazarev joined Vasily Polenov and Adrian Prakhov in their 1881 tour across the Middle East. He took part in excavating the site of Palmyra and discovered the Palmyra Tariff — a large slab with an inscription in Greek and Aramaic listing ancient customs rules. He also financed the excavations at Jerash. A patron and member of the Russian Geographical Society, he published two lavishly decorated volumes about Palmyra (1884) and Jerash (1897).

In 1897, Prince Abamelek married Princess Moina (Maria) Demidova (1877 — 1955), a daughter of the 2nd Prince of San Donato. Soon they bought a villa on the Janiculum which has been known since then as Villa Abamelek. Semyon died suddenly in 1916 and was buried in the Lazarev family sepulchre at the Smolensky Cemetery in St Petersburg.

Prince Abamelek is also remembered as a patron of aviation. In 1912, he established the Romanov Cup for the first aviator who would fly from Saint Petersburg to Moscow and back within 24 hours. The Abamelek Cup was awarded in 1913 for the first flight from Odessa to Saint Petersburg.

His widow continued to live at the Villa di Pratolino near Florence until her death in 1955. The Villa Abamelek was given by the Italian government to the Soviet embassy in 1948. It serves as the official residence of the Russian ambassador to Italy.

== Ancestors ==
Ancestry of Prince Semyon Semyonovich Abamelek-Lazarev

8. Semyon Ivanovich Abamelik 1743-1815
4. David Semyonovich Abamelek
9. Hampervan Georgievna ?
2. Semyon Davydovich Abamelek-Lazarev 1815-1888
10. Ekim Lazarevich Lazarev 1743-1826
5. Marfa Ekimovna Lazareva 1788-1844
11. Anna Sergeevna Ivanova 1766-1820
1. Semyon Abamelek-Lazarev
12. Ekim Lazarevich Lazarev 1743-1826
6. Christopher Ekimovich Lazarev 1789-1871
13. Anna Sergeevna Ivanova 1766-1820
3. Elizaveta Khristoforovna Abamelek-Lazareva 1832-1904
14. Manuc Bei
7. Ekaterina Emmanuilovna Manuc-Bei 1806-1880
15. Maria Hagiovna Harutyun 1773-1828
