= Palmyra Tariff =

Ancient Greek and Palmyrene inscription

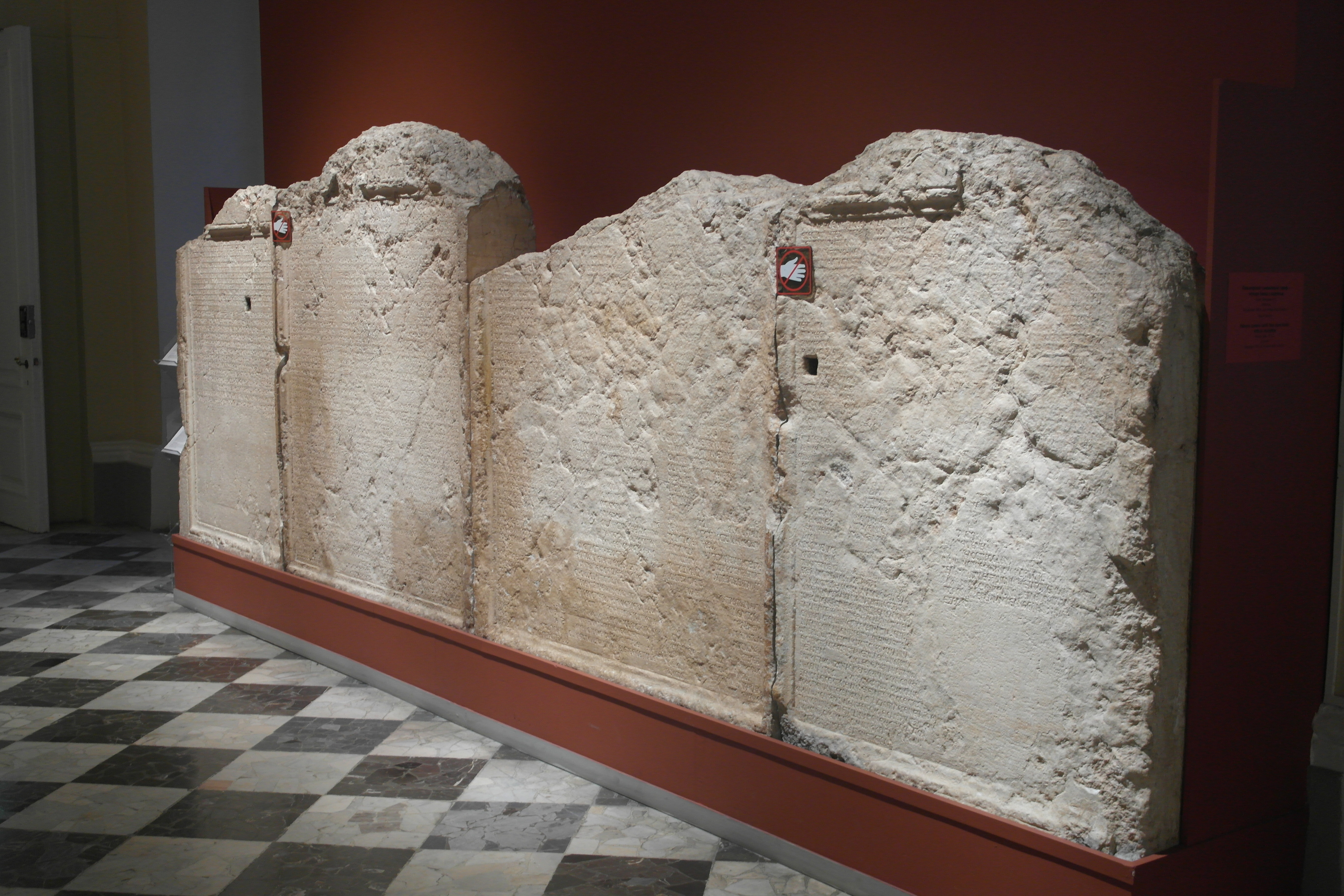
- The tariff in the Hermitage Museum
- Material: Limestone
- Created: 2nd century CE
- Discovered: 1881; Palmyra, Homs, Syria
- Discovered by: Semyon Abamelek-Lazarev
- Present location: Saint Petersburg, Russia

The Palmyra Tariff is an ancient bilingual Greek and Palmyrene inscription discovered in Palmyra, Syria. Dating to the 2nd century CE, the inscription provides valuable insights into the economic and political structure of the city and the wider Roman Empire. It is the longest lapidary Canaanite or Aramaic inscription ever found.

It was discovered in 1881 by Semyon Abamelek-Lazarev, and in 1901 was gifted by the Ottoman Sultan Abdul Hamid II to Tsar Nicholas II and is now in the Hermitage Museum in Saint Petersburg.

Historian John Matthews described the limestone tariff as "one of the most important single items of evidence for the economic life of any part of the Roman Empire".

The inscription is known as PAT 0259, CIS II 3913, NSI 147 and TSSI IV 37.

== Economic Regulation ==
The primary focus of the Palmyra Tariff Inscription is to outline the tariffs and duties imposed on a range of goods and commodities passing through Palmyra. These tariff rates were established to regulate trade and generate essential revenue for the city. The detailed information on specific tariffs offers a comprehensive view of the economic activities that contributed to Palmyra's prosperity.

The inscription also enumerates the names of officials responsible for overseeing trade matters. This provides valuable insights into the administrative structure of Palmyra during the period.

== Layout ==
i	ii			iii			iv	
	Greek Heading (Greek ii 1–2)			?				
	Aramaic Heading (Aramaic ii 1)							
Main Greek Text (Greek i 1–13)	Aramaic ii c 100–148	Aramaic ii b 51–99	Aramaic ii a 2–50	Greek iii a 1–47	Greek iii b 48–93	Greek iii c 49–140	Greek iv a 141–97	Greek iv b 198–237
Main Aramaic Text (Aramaic i 1–11)	Aramaic ii c 100–148	Aramaic ii b 51–99	Aramaic ii a 2–50	Greek iii a 1–47	Greek iii b 48–93	Greek iii c 49–140	Greek iv a 141–97	Greek iv b 198–237
Greek i 14–15 inserted in Aramaic after line 11; Aramaic i 12–13 follow	Aramaic ii c 100–148	Aramaic ii b 51–99	Aramaic ii a 2–50	Greek iii a 1–47	Greek iii b 48–93	Greek iii c 49–140	Greek iv a 141–97	Greek iv b 198–237
	Aramaic ii 149			Greek iii a 1–47	Greek iii b 48–93	Greek iii c 49–140	Greek iv a 141–97	Greek iv b 198–237

== Bibliography ==
- Waddington, William Henry (1882). "Lettre du prince Lazarew sur une inscription datée de Palmyre". Comptes rendus des séances de l'Académie des Inscriptions et Belles-Lettres (in French). 26 (2): 79–81. doi:10.3406/crai.1882.68768. ISSN 0065-0536.
- Eugène-Melchior de Vogüé, 1883 Inscriptions Palmyréniennes Inédites, Journal Asiatique 1, 231–245; and Inscriptions Palmyréniennes Inédites, Journal Asiatique 2, 149–183
- Duval, R., "Communication sur la loi fiscale de Palmyre." JA 8/2 (1883): 537–39
- Cagnat, R., "Remarques sur un tarif récemment découvert à Palmyre." Revue de philologie 8 (1884): 135–44
- Semyon Abamelek-Lazarev, (1884), Пальмира. Археологические исследования
- Dessau, H., "Die Steuertarif von Palmyra." Hermes 19 (1884): 486–533
- Duval, R., "Le passif dans l'araméen biblique et la palmyrénien." REJ 8 (1884): 57–63
- Reckendorf, S., "Der aramäische Teil des palmyrenschen Zoll-und Steuertarifs." ZDMG 42 (1888): 370–415
- Chabot, J.-B., "Remarques sur le Tarif de Palmyre." JA (1918)
- Seyrig, Henri (1941). "Antiquités syriennes: 36. Le statut de Palmyre". Syria. 22 (2). Institut Francais du Proche-Orient: 155–175. doi:10.3406/syria.1941.4234. ISSN 0039-7946. JSTOR 4196346.
- Piganiol, A. (1945). "Observations Sur le Tarif de Palmyre". Revue Historique. 195 (1). Presses Universitaires de France: 10–23. ISSN 0035-3264. JSTOR 40947468.
- Шифман, И.Ш. (1980). Пальмирский пошлинный тариф (in Russian). Издательство "Наука". Главная редакция восточной литературы.
- Teixidor J. (1983), Le Tarif de Palmyre: Un commentaire de la version palmyrenienne, Aula Orientalis 1, pp. 235–252
- Matthews, J. F. (1984). "The Tax Law of Palmyra: Evidence for Economic History in a City of the Roman East". The Journal of Roman Studies. 74. [Society for the Promotion of Roman Studies, Cambridge University Press]: 157–180. doi:10.2307/299013. ISSN 0075-4358. JSTOR 299013.
- Healey, John F. (2009). Aramaic Inscriptions and Documents of the Roman Period. Textbook of Syrian Semitic Inscriptions. Vol. 4. Oxford University Press. ISBN 978-0-19-925256-5.
- Gawlikowski, Michał (2011). Zych, Iwona; Szymczak, Agnieszka (eds.). "Palmyra: reexcavating the site of the Tariff (fieldwork in 2010 and 2011)". Polish Archaeology in the Mediterranean. 23 (1). Warsaw University Press. ISSN 1234-5415.
- Gawlikowski, Michel (2012). "Le tarif de Palmyre et le temple de Rab'Asirê". Comptes rendus des séances de l'Académie des Inscriptions et Belles-Lettres (in French). 156 (2): 765–780. doi:10.3406/crai.2012.93567. ISSN 0065-0536.
- Shifman, Ilia Sholeimovich; Healey, John F. (2014). The Palmyrene Tax Tariff. Oxford: Oxford University Press on behalf of the University of Manchester. ISBN 978-0-19-872615-9.

== See also ==
- Bilingual inscriptions
- Marseille Tariff
- Carthage Tariff
