= Son of Baalshillek marble base =

Punic language inscription

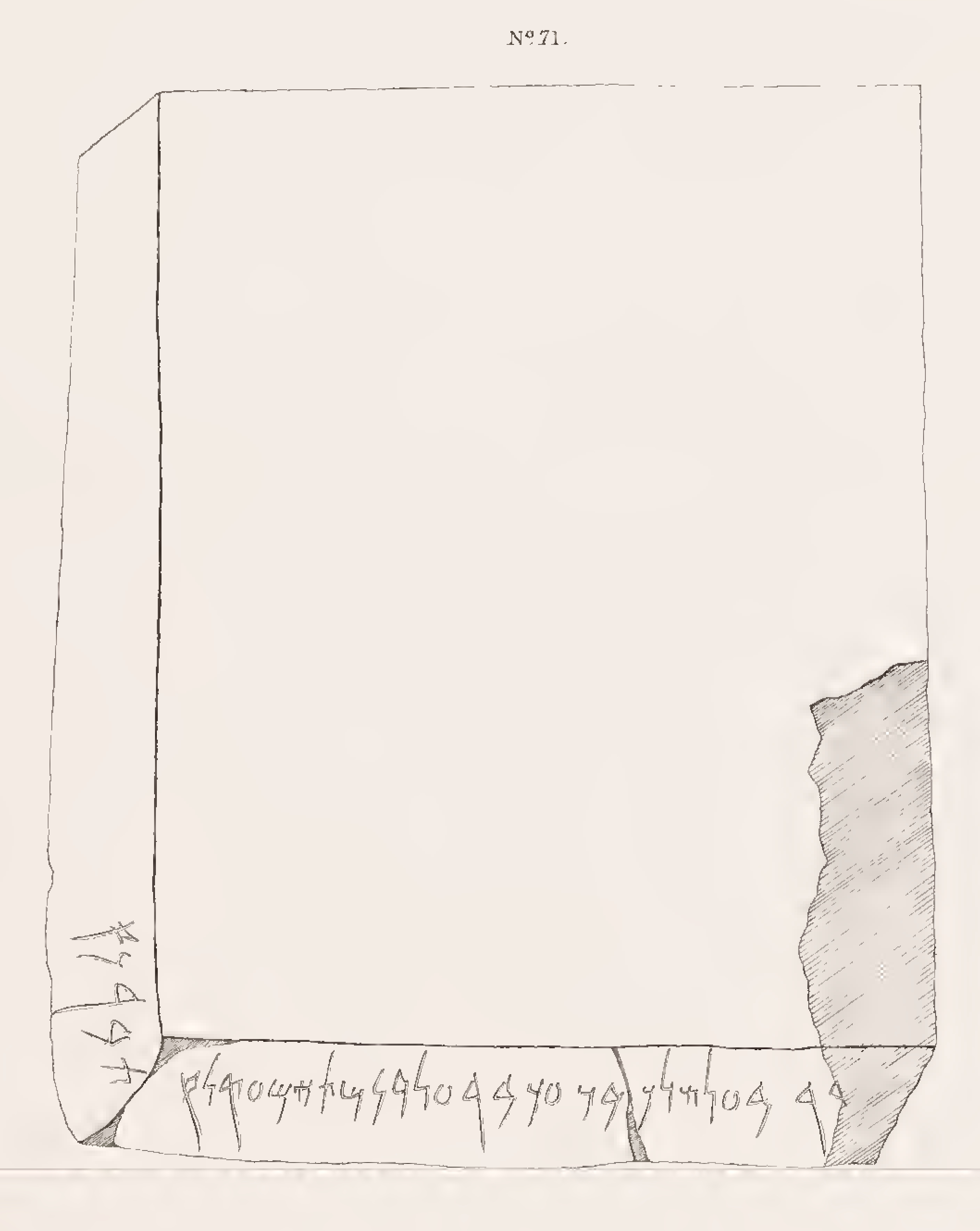
CIS I 178 or KAI 84 in Nathan Davis Phoenician Inscriptions from Carthage in the British Museum (1856-58)

The Son of Baalshillek marble base is a Punic language inscription on a marble statue base discovered in 1856–58 at Carthage in Tunisia.

It was first published by Nathan Davis, and the one-line inscription is known as KAI 84 and CIS I 178.

Davis wrote that "This tablet is peculiar, as well for its material (white marble) as for its inscription. The plain square may have served as the base of a statuette,—the subject of the epitaph on the edges, of which two only have been preserved."

Of all the inscriptions found by Davis, it was one of just three that was not a traditional Carthaginian tombstone - the other two being number 73 (the Carthage tower model) and number 90 (the Carthage Tariff), which contained a bevelled architectural ornamentation.

It is held in the archives of the British Museum, as BM 125217.

== Inscription ==
Nathan Davis initially translated it in Latin as follows: "vovit Baâl-Malek, filius Àchar, ob filium mortuum. [Ubi]? audiverit ejus vocem, ei benedicat."

The British Museum state two possible translations: "vow of Baalshillek son of 'Akbar for his son. May you hear his voice and bless him" or "vow of Baalshillek for his dead son. Hear his voice and bless him."

It is thought to be either evidence of a child sacrifice, a monument to a beloved son, or a vow for the health of a sick child.
