= Saint Catherine's Armenian Church =

Armenian Apostolic church in Saint Petersburg, Russia

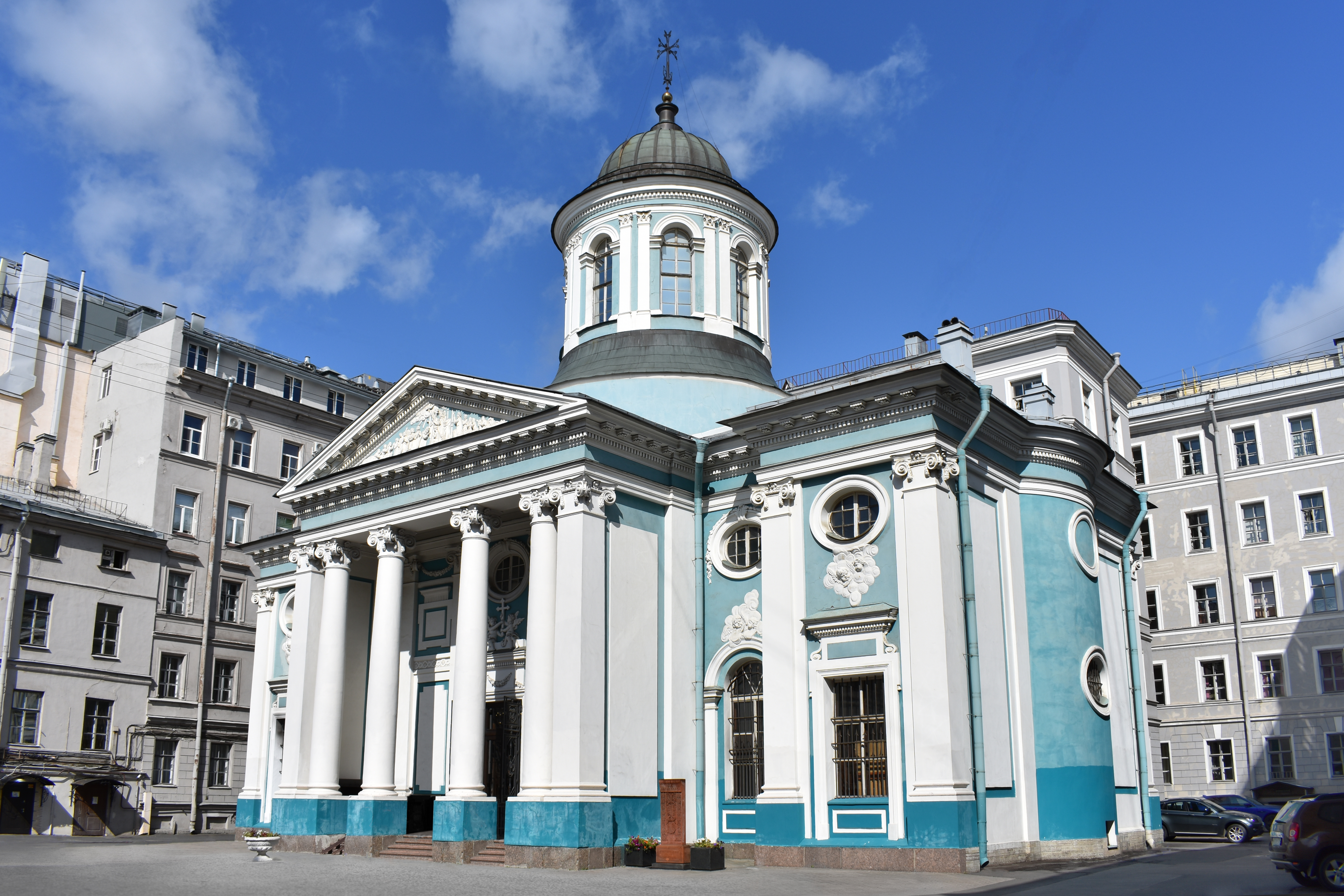

Religion
- Affiliation: Armenian Apostolic Church
- Year consecrated: February 18, 1780
- Status: Active

Location
- Location: 40-42 Nevsky Prospect, Saint Petersburg, Russia
- Interactive map of Saint Catherine's Armenian Church
- Coordinates: 59.93526°N 30.33318°E

Architecture
- Architect: Yury Felten
- Style: Neoclassical, Russian Classicism
- Groundbreaking: 1771
- Completed: 1776

St. Catherine's Armenian Church (Russian: Армянская церковь Святой Екатерины, Armyanskaya tserkov Svyatoy Yekaterini; Armenian: Սուրբ Կատարինե եկեղեցի, Surb Katarine yekeghetsi) is an Armenian Apostolic church on Nevsky Prospect, in central Saint Petersburg, Russia. Built in the 1770s, it is one of the earliest Armenian churches in Russia.

== History ==
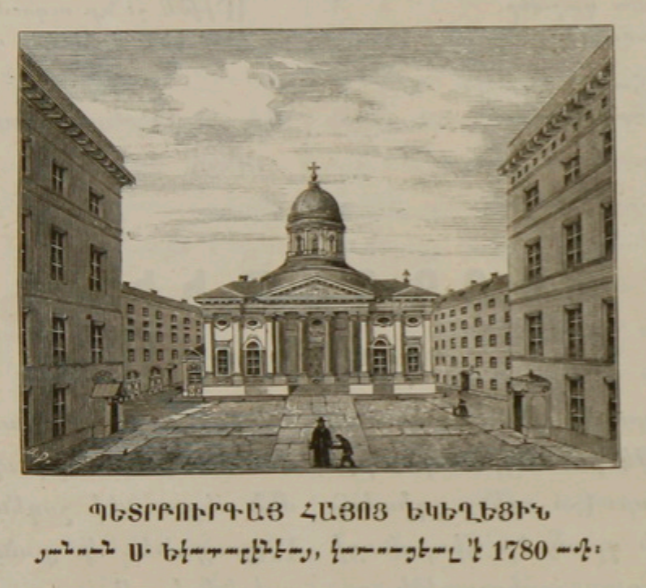
An image of the church from 1880.

=== Foundation ===
Private stables of Empress Elizabeth of Russia stood on its location in the mid-18th century, until it was granted to Petersburg Armenians on May 2, 1770 by Empress Catherine the Great, upon the request of her Armenian jeweler Ivan Lazarev. Its construction was primarily financed by Lazarev, who provided 30,000 rubles of the total 33,000. The church was designed by Yury Felten and is an early example of Russian Classicism. Its construction began in the spring of 1771 and was completed in 1776. The church was consecrated on February 18, 1780, by Hovsep Arghutian (Prince Argutinsky-Dolgorukov), the archbishop of the Russian diocese of the Armenian church, in the presence of Prince Grigory Potemkin, the favourite of Catherine the Great. It is named after Catherine of Alexandria, a namesake of the empress. Colored white and blue, it has a neoclassical portico and single cupola.

=== Later history ===
It became the center of Armenian cultural activity in the Russian imperial capital. The first Armenian publishing house in Russia functioned nearby. The church did not have bells until 1865, when Khristofo E. Lazarev received permission to install them. The church was completely renovated by the Russian-Armenian architect Alexander Tamanian in 1906–09.

The church was closed down by Soviet authorities no later than May 1930. During the Second World War, the building served as the headquarters of the anti-aircraft defense and later as a decoration room of the Leningrad Theater of Musical Comedy. The Armenian community regained ownership of the church in August 1992 and the first mass took place in March 1993. After thorough restoration, the church was reconsecrated on July 12, 2000 by Karekin II, Catholicos of All Armenians, and Patriarch Alexy II of Moscow. It was renovated again in 2014.

== Gallery ==
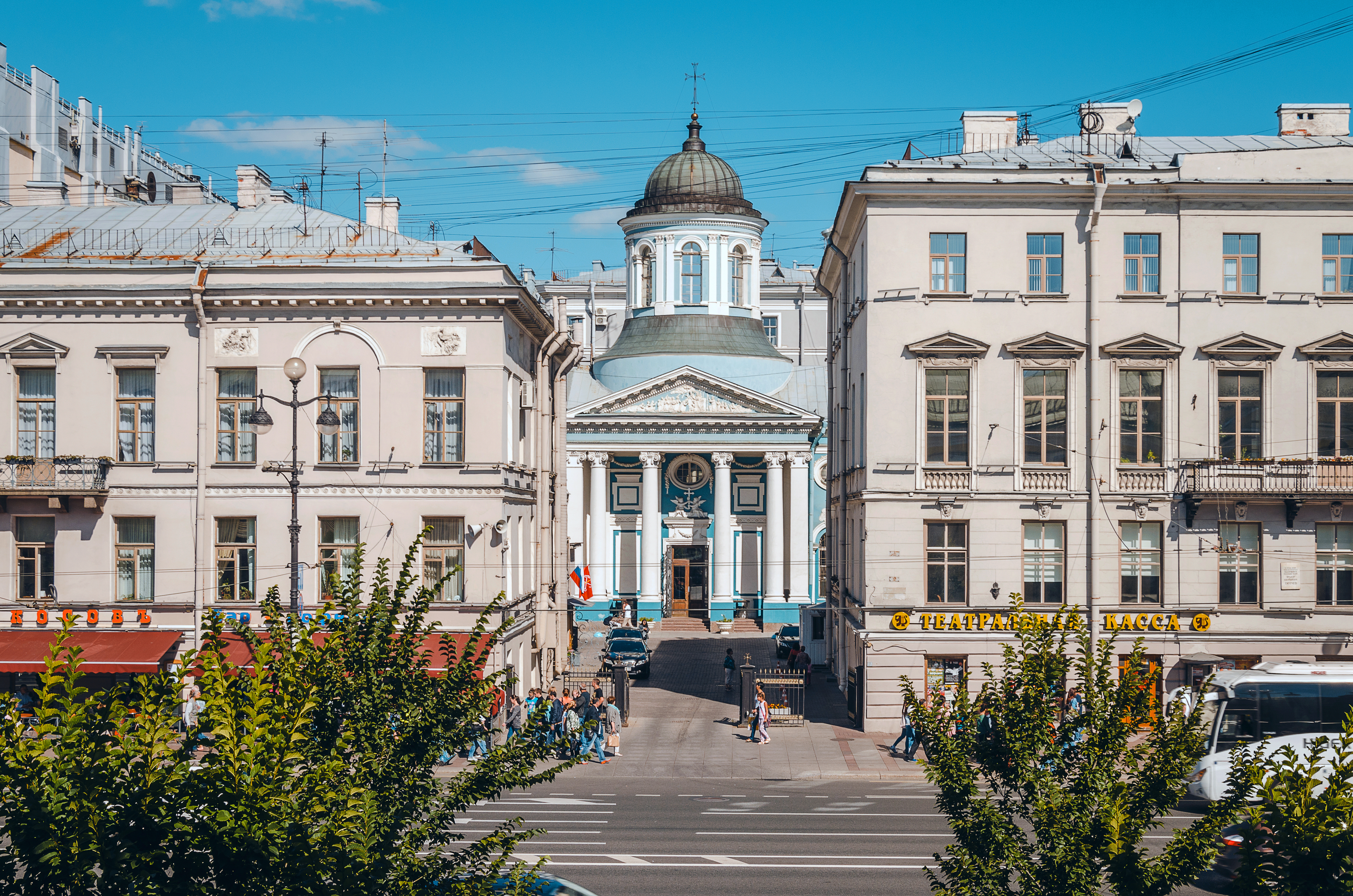

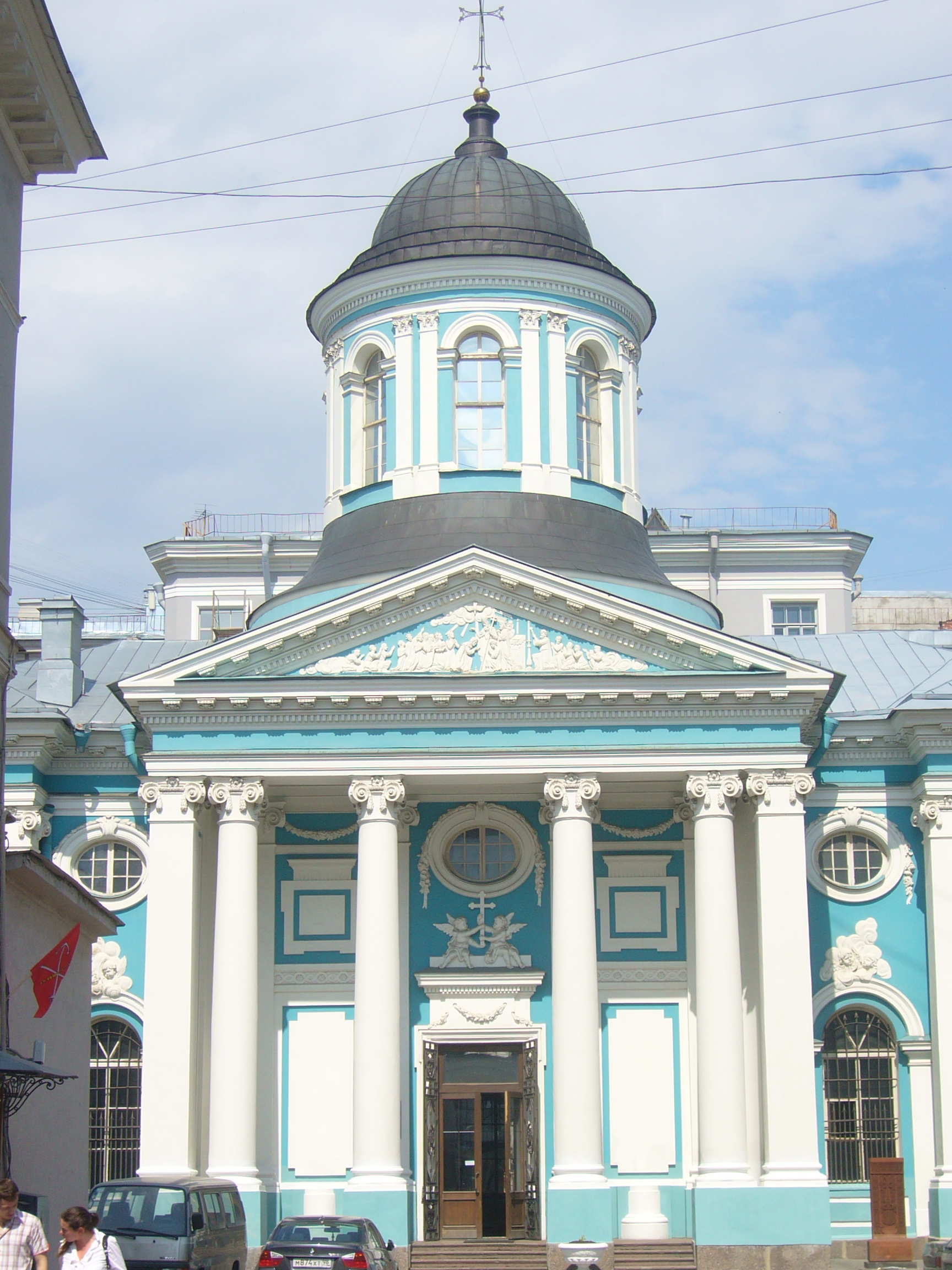

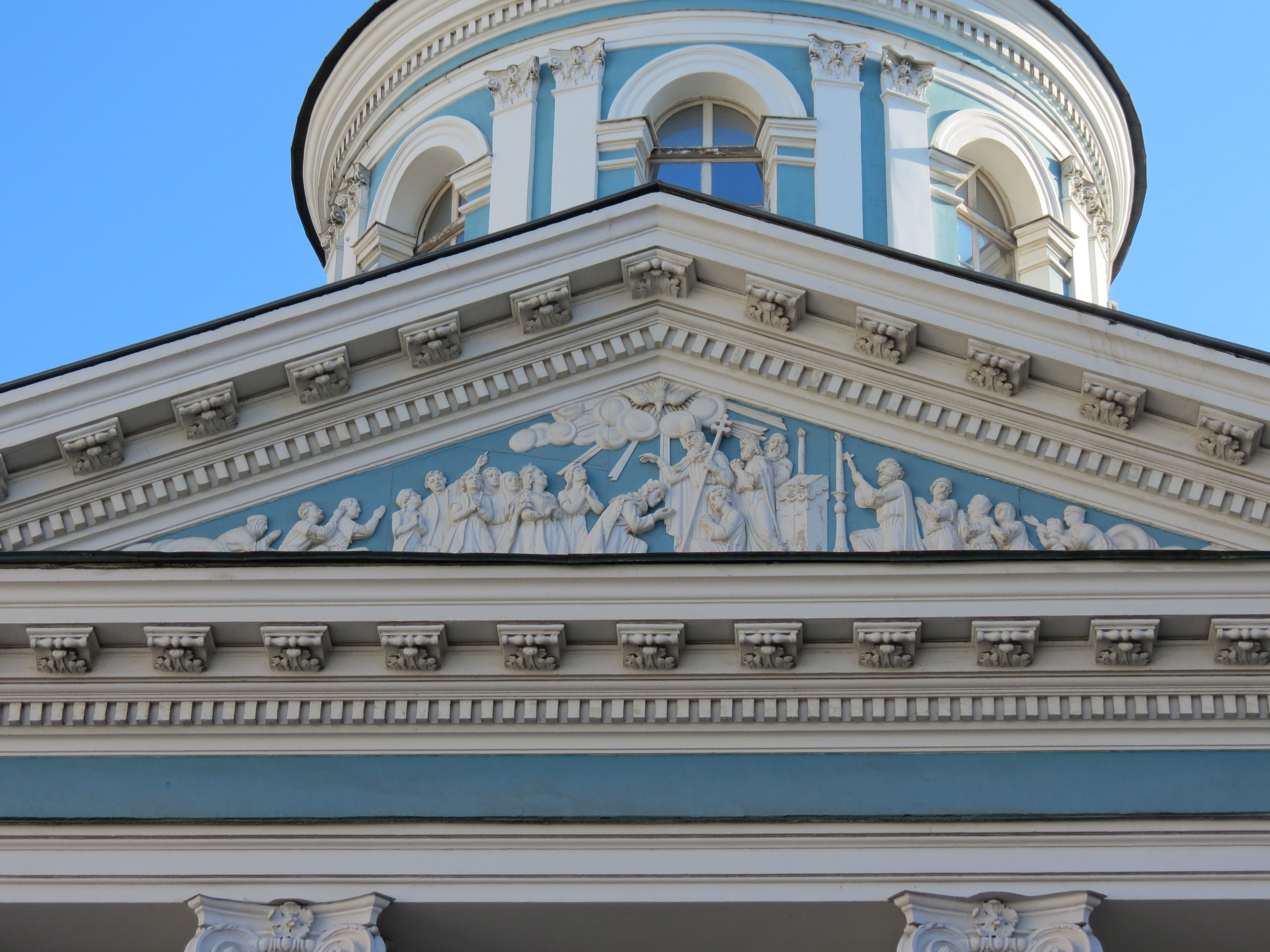

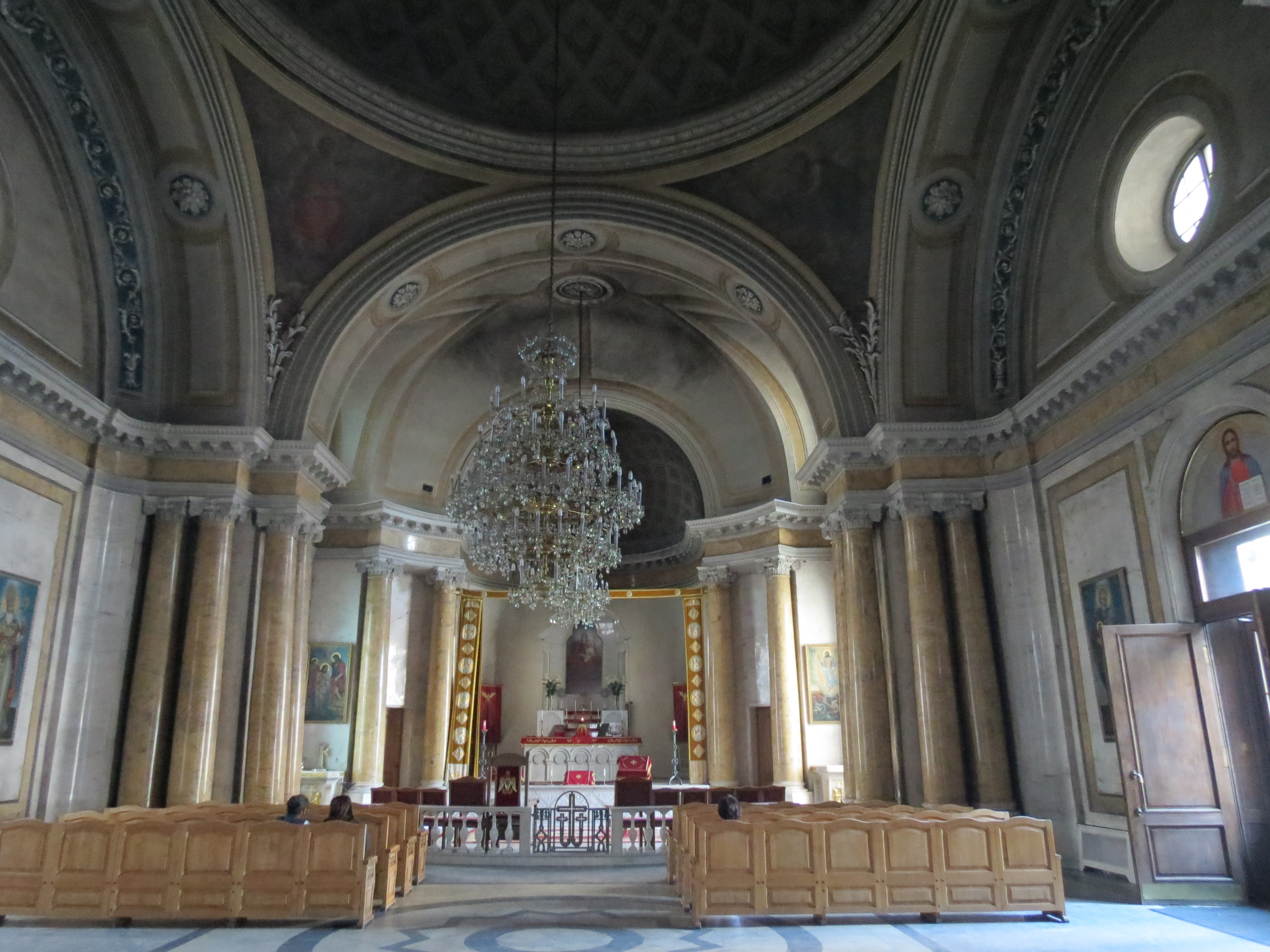
