= Nathan Davis (traveller) =

British archaeologist

Nathan Davis (1812–1882) was a British archaeologist known for his work on the site of Carthage. He published Carthage and her remains (1861).

== Early life and background ==
Suggestions that Davis was an American are not now accepted. He was British, born in London of Jewish background, and later became a Christian convert.

== Missionary work ==
By his late 20s Davis was working for the London Society for Promoting Christianity Among the Jews (LSPCJ). The association with the Society eventually damaged his reputation, according to Moses Margoliouth. Davis chose to side with Margoliouth and Alexander M'Caul in his approach to missionary work, rather than with the alternative views of Charlotte Elizabeth Tonna and Stanislaus Hoga.

Davis spent a number of years in Northern Africa, at Tunis, as missionary to the Jews. From 1838 to 1843 he was there for the LSPCJ. He lived first at Douar el Chott (Dawwar ash Shatt) near Tunis. In his Voice from North Africa (1844), Davis attacked some British supposed philo-Semites, and that cost him his position with the LSPCJ.

In 1844 Davis travelled to Scotland, returning to Tunis as a missionary for the Church of Scotland. He held that position to 1848. He was struggling with the work, however, and having caused offence to the local Jewish community was transferred to missionary work in Gibraltar, in 1849. That mission was closed in 1850, and Davis was moved back to London.

In 1852 Davis, still employed by the Church of Scotland as a missionary to London Jews, edited the Hebrew Christian Magazine. He became a nonconformist Christian minister.

== Work for the British Museum ==
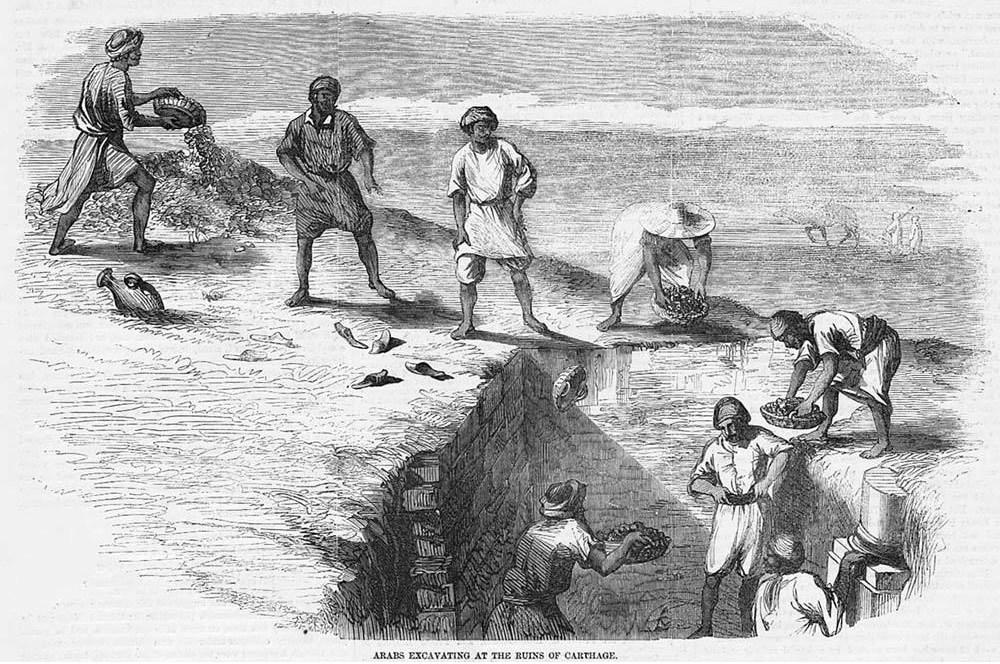
Excavations at Carthage run by Nathan Davis, 1858 engraving in the Illustrated London News

From 1856 to 1858 Davis was engaged on behalf of the British Museum in excavations at Carthage and Utica. When Jane Franklin stayed with the Davises in 1858, they were living in Gammarth. The visit overlapped a period during which Gustave Flaubert called socially.

With the backing of Anthony Panizzi, Davis had received British Foreign Office support for his dig, an unusual arrangement. Archaeological work had already been done at Carthage by the Danish consul Christian Tuxen Falbe, and the British consul Thomas Reade. Cases from Davis arrived at the museum in 1857; there were 51 cases received in 1858, and more in 1860.

The major antiquities discovered were Roman mosaic pavements, and Phœnician inscriptions – the latter including the Son of Baalshillek marble base, the Carthage Tariff and the Carthage tower model. Augustus Wollaston Franks was writing on the finds by 1859. The inscription were worked on by William Sandys Wright Vaux with Emanuel Oscar Menahem Deutsch, a book Inscriptions in the Phoenician Character (1863) by Vaux offering translation into Latin with transcription into the Hebrew alphabet. This transliteration then became standard.

== Last years ==
Shortly before his death Davis revisited Tunis. He died in Florence on 6 January 1882 of congestion of the lungs.

== Works ==
Davis wrote:

- Tunis, or Selections from a Journal during a Residence in that Regency, Malta, 1841.
- A Voice from North Africa, or a Narrative illustrative of the … Manners of the Inhabitants of that Part of the World, Edinburgh [1844?]; another ed., dated 1844, Edinburgh.
- Israel's true Emancipator, two letters to Nathan Marcus Adler, London, 1852. Under the pseudonym "E. H. C. M." (i.e. Editor of the Hebrew Christian Magazine).
- With Benjamin Davidson, Arabic Reading Lessons, London [1854].
- Evenings in my Tent, or Wanderings in Balad, Ejjareed, illustrating the … Conditions of various Arab Tribes of the African Sahara, 2 vols., London, 1854.
- Carthage and her Remains, London, 1861.
- Ruined Cities within Numidian and Carthaginian Territories, London, 1862.

== Notes ==
Attribution

This article incorporates text from a publication now in the public domain: Stephen, Leslie, ed. (1888). "Davis, Nathan". Dictionary of National Biography. Vol. 14. London: Smith, Elder & Co.
