= Abamelik =

Noble family of Armenian origin

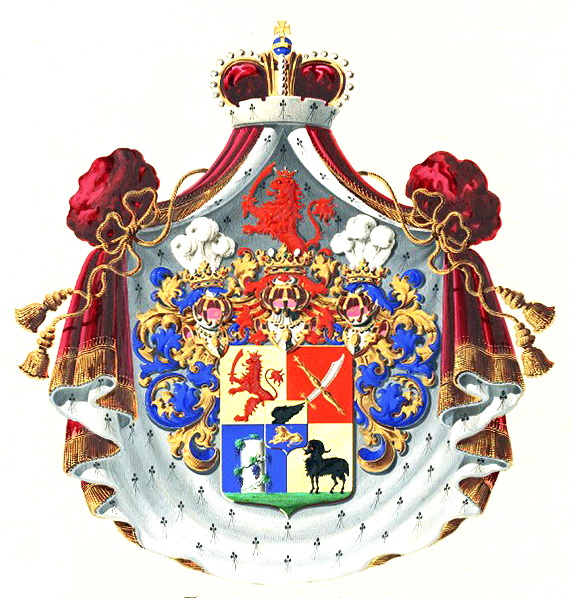
Arms of the Princes Abamelek-Lazarev

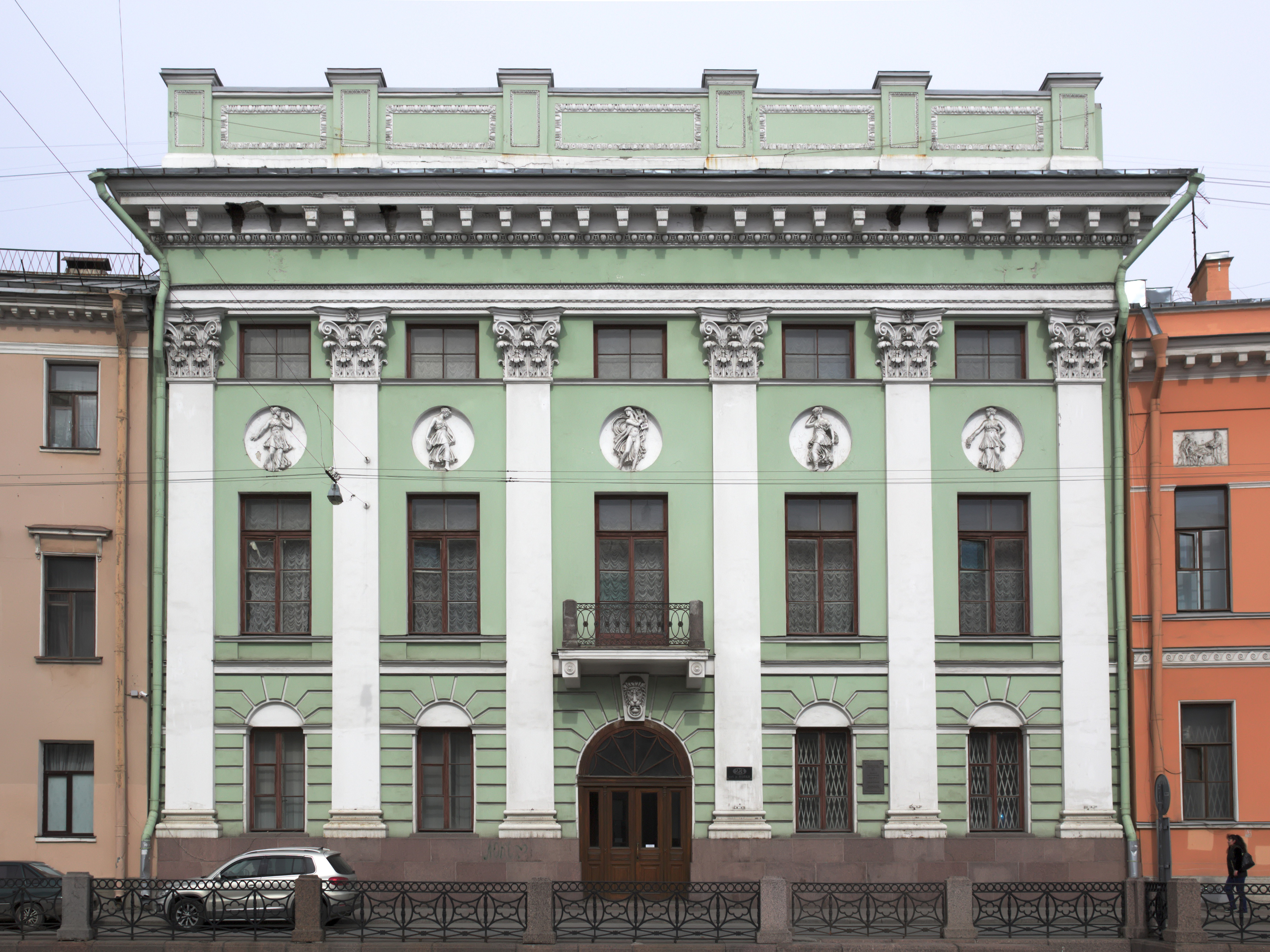
Abamelek palace, St Petersburg, Russia

The House of Abamelek (Armenian: Աբամելիք, Georgian: აბამელიქი, Russian: Абамелик; also rendered as Abamelik, Abymelikov) was a noble family of Armenian origin in the Kingdom of Georgia, and then in the Russian Empire.

== History ==
Under Paul I, Simon Abamelik (1743-1815), arrived in St. Petersburg from Georgia with his sons on the 29th of October, 1798, and presented the emperor with a large, pure-water diamond as a gift; having graciously accepted this offering, Paul I in 1799 granted Simon 500 souls of peasants from the state estates of the Podolsk province. The Tsar ordered the six sons of Simon to be accepted into service, Ivan, David, Zakhar, Alexander, Georgy and Peter

According to the Brockhaus and Efron Encyclopedic Dictionary (1890–1906), the family attained to the dignity of princes of the 3rd rank when the Georgian crown prince David (1767–1819) married in 1800 to Helene Abamelek (1770–1836), the only daughter of the priest Simon Abamelik. After annexation of Georgia by Russia in 1801, the family was incorporated into the Russian nobility and officially included in the List of Georgian Princes of the Russian Empire in 1850.

In 1873, Major-General Semyon D Abamelek (1815–1888) was granted the right to assume the surname of his late father-in-law, Christopher Ekimovich Lazarev (1789–1871), for himself and his descendants — the princes Abamelek-Lazarev (Абамелик-Лазаревы).

By 1906, both the Abamelek and Abamelek-Lazarev lines were registered in the governorates of Moscow, Podolsk, and Tula. Semyon's son, Prince Semyon S Abamelek-Lazarev, was married to Princess Maria (Moina) Demidov of San Donato (1877-1955), a daughter of the 2nd Prince of San Donato. Prince Semyon S Abamelek-Lazarev wrote that their lineage descends "from the ancient princes of Mariobiz and Agdzen, who migrated from Kurdistan in 1421, as confirmed by the original charter of King Heraclius, which I have...by the charters of Heraclius II dated March 29, 1788.".

The Armenian composer Makar Yekmalyan dedicated his Nocturne for piano to Prince Semyon Abamelek-Lazarev.

On the Moika Embankment in St Petersburg there is a palace that once belonged to Abamelek-Lazarev family. There is also Villa Abamelek in Rome, which nowadays, is the residence of the Russian ambassador to the Italian Republic.

== Descendants ==
Abamelek-Lazarev descendants
- Prince Semyon Davydovich Abamelek-Lazarev (1815-1888)
  - Prince Semyon Semyonovich Abamelek-Lazarev (1853-1855)
  - Ekaterina Semenovna Olsufiev (1856-1927)
    - Prince Boris Sergeevich Meshchersky (1881-1926)
    - Ekaterina Sergeevna Raevsky (1883-1938)
      - Sergei Vadimovich Raevsky (1903-1969)
      - Olga Vadimovna Raevsky (1905–1980)
      - Vadim Vadimovich Raevsky (1909-1947)
    - Princess Sophia Sergeevna Meshcherskaya (1888-1935)
    - Natalia Sergeevna Bibikov (1891-?)
    - Prince Ivan Sergeevich Meshchersky (1893-1937)
    - Elizaveta Sergeevna Kuzminsky (1896-?)
  - Prince Semyon Semyonovich Abamelek-Lazarev (1857-1916)
  - Princess Elena Semenovna Gagarin (1859-1929)
  - Countess Elizaveta Semenovna Olsufiev (1866-1934)
    - Count Andrei Andreevich Olsufiev (1894-1967)
      - Olga Andreevna Olsufiev(1920–?)
      - Count Andrei Andreevich Olsufiev (1924-1975)
    - Count Alexey Andreevich Olsufiev (1895-1919)
    - Marquise Anna Andreevna de Merindol (1900-1985)
      - Countess Daria Antonia Maria Shuvalov (1932–)
      - Marquis Peter Henry de Merindol (1934–2026)

== See also ==
- List of Georgian princely families
