= Carthage Tariff =

Punic inscription in Tunisia

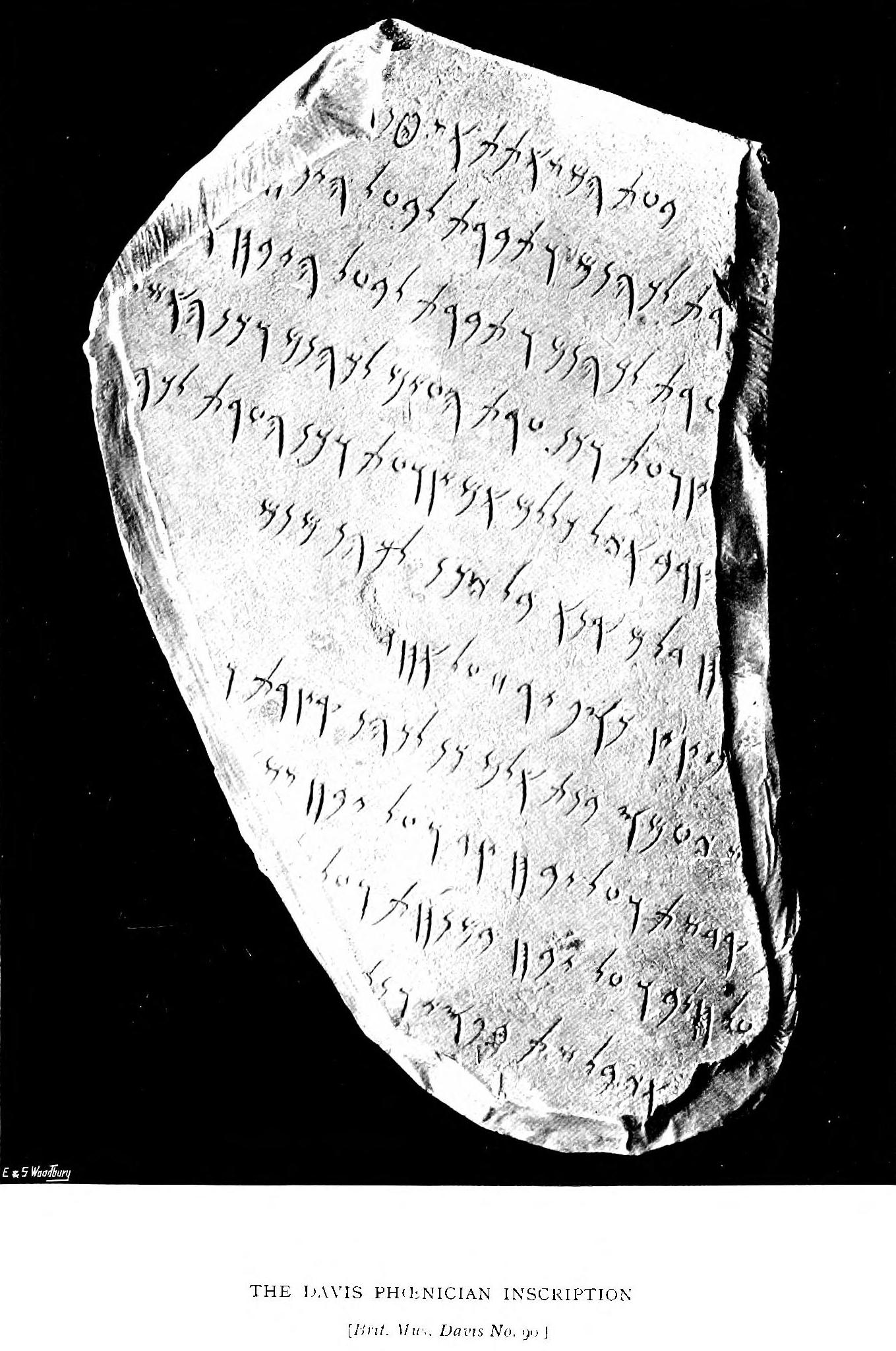
- As shown in Cooke's Text-book of North-Semitic Inscriptions
- Material: Limestone
- Created: c. 300 BC
- Discovered: 1856-58; Tunis, Tunisia
- Present location: British Museum, London
- Identification: BM 125303
- Language: Punic

The Carthage Tariff is a Punic language inscription from the third century BCE, found on a fragments of a limestone stela in 1856-58 at Carthage in Tunisia. It is thought to be related to the Marseille Tariff, found two decades earlier.

It was first published by Nathan Davis, and the 11-line inscription is known as KAI 74 and CIS I 167.

Of all the inscriptions found by Davis, it was one of just three that was not a traditional Carthaginian tombstone - the other two being number 71 (the Son of Baalshillek marble base) and number 73 (the Carthage tower model).

The plaque lists the payments for ritual sacrifices, including which portions go to the priests and which to the offerer. It is thought to have been placed on a temple wall, setting out the rules for those giving offerings.

It is held in the archives of the British Museum, as BM 125303.

== Gallery ==
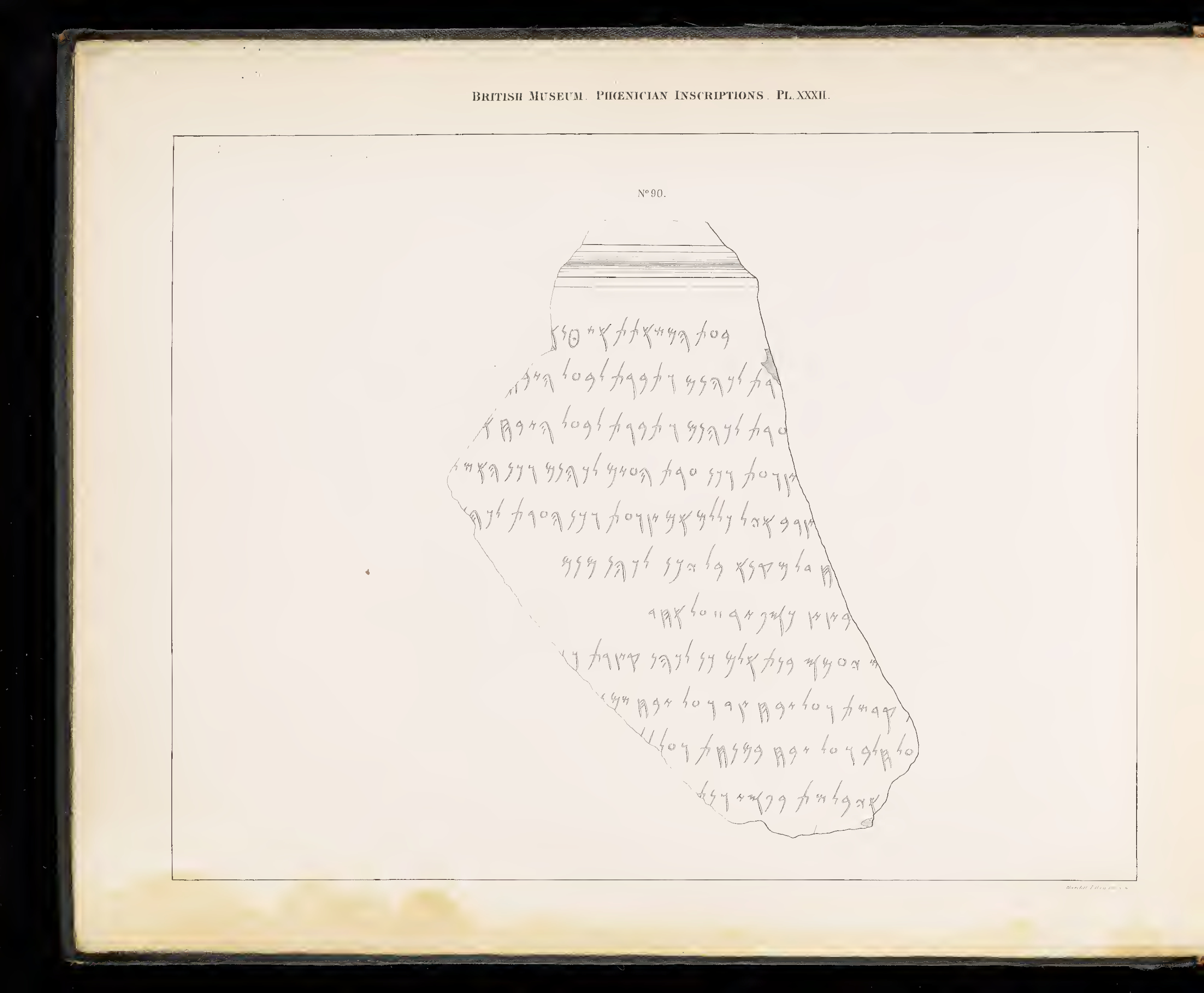

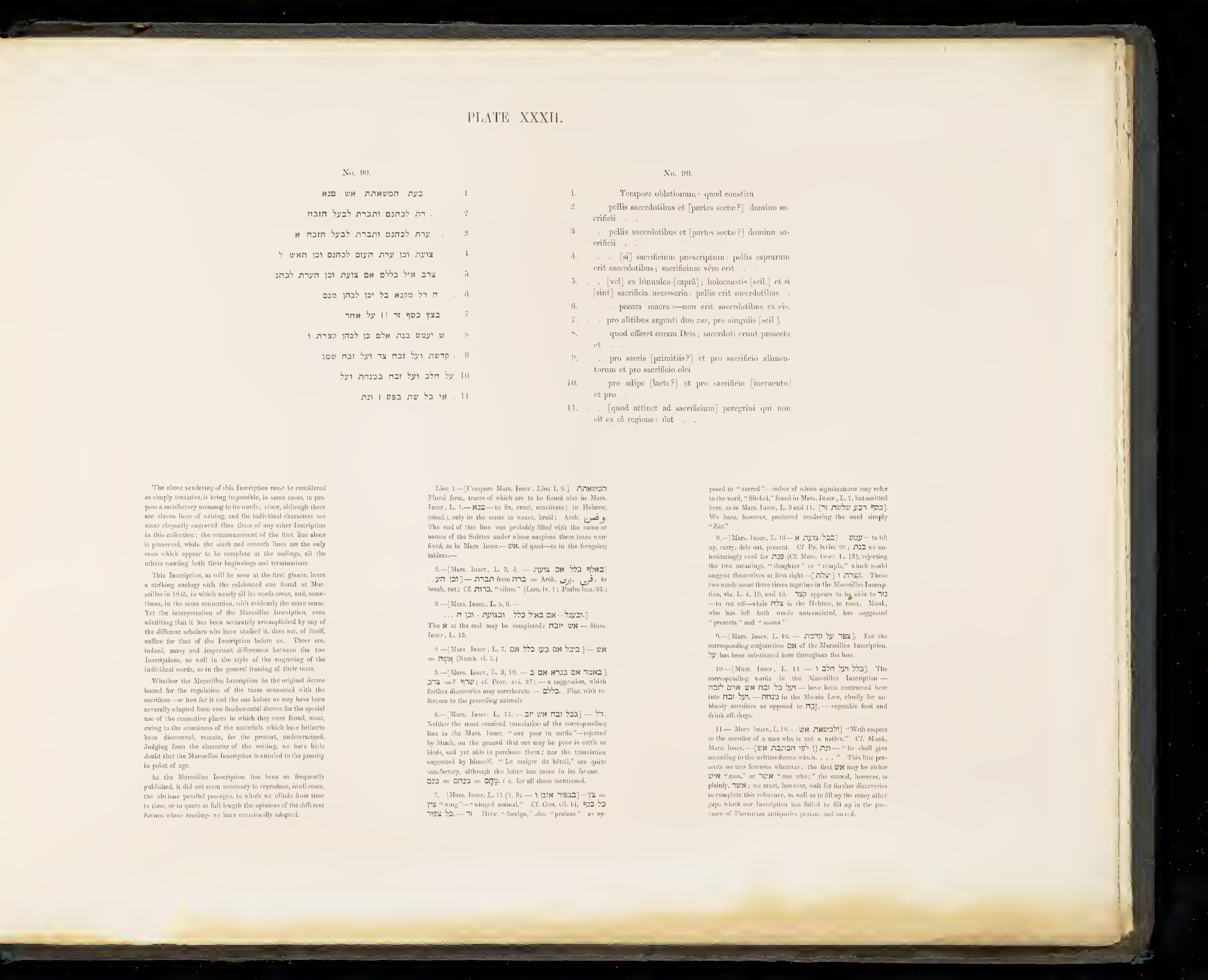

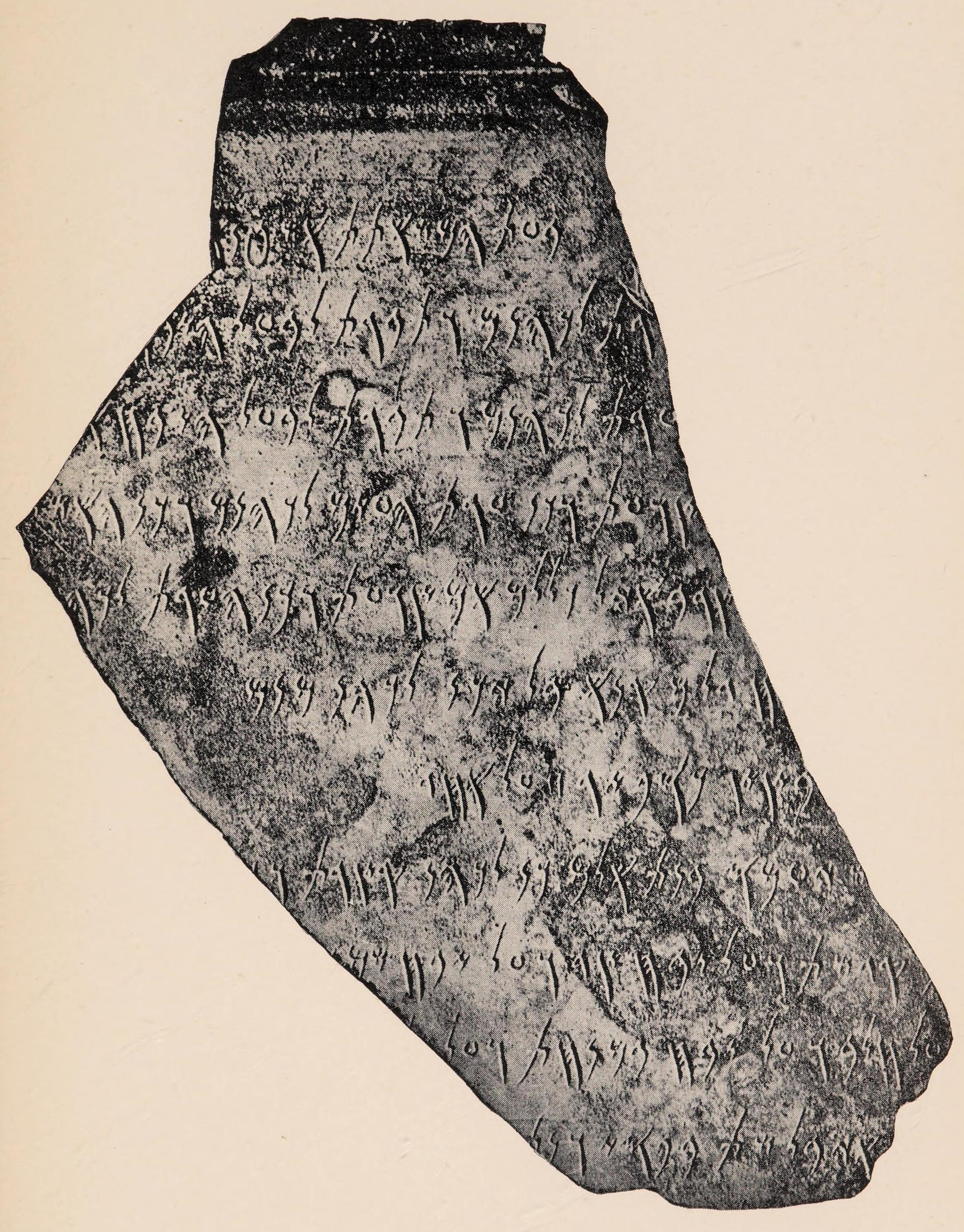

== See also ==
- Palmyra Tariff
- Marseille Tariff
