= Jean-Joseph-Léandre Bargès =

Abbe Jean-Joseph-Léandre Bargès (February 27, 1810, in Auriol, Bouches-du-Rhône – December 31, 1896) was a French orientalist.

In 1834 Bargès was officially appointed as a priest and became an Arabic teacher at Marseille in 1837. From 1842 to 1885 Bargès was professor of Arabic at the Theological Academy in Paris.

Bargès focused on the study of the Qarawiyyin medieval scholars, publishing commentaries in Arabic from Yefet ben Ali, interpreted various psalms (1861) and later reviewed Nasyid al-Anasyid (1884). Bargès also published a treatise of Judah ibn Kuraish, on the study of the emergence of Hebrew.
