= Ivan Lazarevich Lazarev =

Russian jeweler (1735–1801)

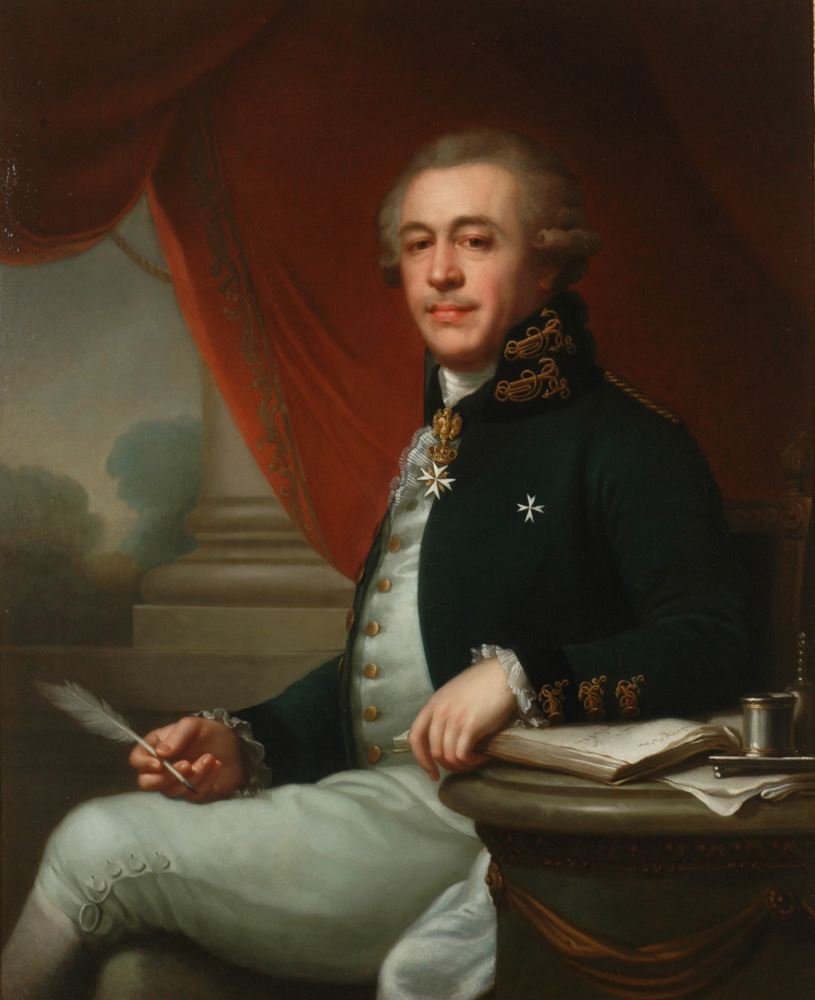
Reichsgraf von Lazareff. A portrait by Johann Lampi, 1790.

Hovhannes Lazarian (Armenian: Հովհաննես Լազարյան), better known under his Russian name as Ivan Lazarevich Lazarev (Russian: Иван Лазаревич Лазарев, 4 December 1735 – 5 November 1801), was a Russian-Armenian financier and millionaire. A court banker to Catherine the Great, he was the only Armenian to receive the title of Imperial Count (Reichsgraf, 1788).

He was born in the Armenian quarter of Isfahan, where his ancestors had been mayors since the early 17th century. His father Agasar (1700-1782) claimed descent from Prince Manuk Lazarianz who had defended Julfa from Shah Abbas I. After moving to Isfahan, Manuk helped establish an Armenian colony and was made its governor. His son Lazar headed Abbas II's mint and treasury in Isfahan.

Agasar Lazarian started trading with Russia at the time of Peter the Great's Persian war. After the death of Nader Shah (1747) Agasar and his sons left Persia and moved to Astrakhan before settling in Moscow. After establishing a silk mill in Fryanovo (1735), they were recognized as the exclusive purveyors of silk and some other luxury items to the court of Empress Elizabeth. They received the title of Freiherr from Empress Maria Theresa in 1768.

It was Hovhannes who moved the family's operations from Moscow to Saint Petersburg. He was the intermediary between Count Grigory Orlov and Shaffrass, a Persian millionaire (and supposedly his wife's uncle), in the purchase of the Great Mogul Diamond, which came to be known as the Orlov Diamond. His great wealth allowed him to buy from the Stroganov family some important steel works and 115 000 hectares of land in the Northern Urals, where he also set up several new mills. At the time of his death he owned more than 16 000 male serfs.

When Catherine the Great asked Lazarev to advise her on the oriental policies in 1774, he drew up a plan of reviving the state of Armenia, with Prince Potemkin as its monarch. After the Treaty of Jassy he came up with a more feasible plan of resettling Armenians from the Ottoman Empire to the lands conquered by Russia in the Black Sea region (so that they could practise their faith openly). He helped thousands of Armenians to find a new home in the Crimea, Kizlyar, New Nakhichevan and Grigoriopolis.

Lazarev bought the royal manor of Ropsha near the Russian capital and commissioned Georg von Veldten to build a new palace there. He financed the construction of Saint Catherine's Armenian Church in St Petersburg (also designed by Veldten). At his estate in Fryanovo near Moscow he built a Palladian villa, which still stands.

After the death of his only son, Count Lazarev bequeathed his property to his brother Ovakim (Ekim) and asked him to set up a Moscow school for poor Armenian children, which materialized as the Lazarev Institute of Oriental Languages. His fortune eventually came into the hands of Prince Abamelik.

== Awards ==
- Order of Saint John of Jerusalem
