= Khaznadar inscriptions =

Punic inscriptions in Tunisia

The Khaznadar inscriptions are approximately 120 Punic inscriptions, found in Carthage by Muhammad Khaznadar in the 1860s in Husainid Tunisia.

In 1869 Heinrich von Maltzan noted that Khaznadar's museum contained more than 120 Punic inscriptions (2/3 Punic and 1/3 neo-Punic) found during Khaznadar's excavations in three different points around the ruins of Carthage.

A number of the inscriptions were published in 1870 by von Maltzen in his 1870 Travels in the regencies of Tunis and Tripoli, and again in the following year by Julius Euting in his Punic stones.

== Concordance ==
A number of the most notable inscriptions have been collected in the corpuses of Canaanite and Aramaic inscriptions, notably the Corpus Inscriptionum Semiticarum and the Kanaanäische und Aramäische Inschriften.

Name	Image	Discovered	No. units	Est. Date	Location found	Current Location	Concordance						
Name	Image	Discovered	No. units	Est. Date	Location found	Current Location	KAI	CIS / RÉS	NE	KI	NSI	TSSI	Oth. ref.
Carthaginian mother goddess inscription		1866-69	1		Carthage		83	I 177		72	47		Carth 215
Maltzen Sard	link	1866-69	1		Carthage	lost (was at Paris WF)		I 180	432, 15	84			
Maltzen 1	[image]	1866-69	1		Carthage			I 2016	431, 11	82			Carth 151
Maltzen 23		1866-69	1		Carthage		88	I 1885	431, 13	83			Carth 162
Maltzen 47	[image]	1866-69	1		Carthage			I 363	431, 12				Carth 183

KAI 88 (= CIS I 1885 = KI 83 = AO 28126):

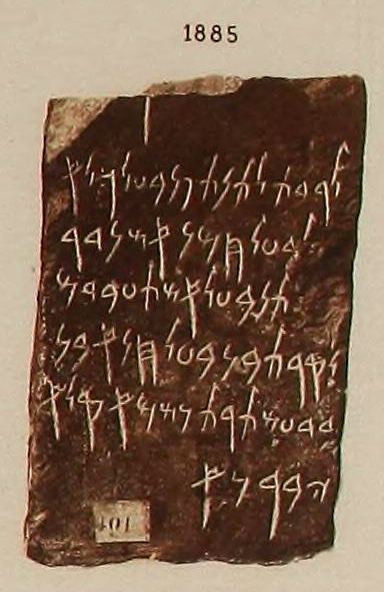
(line 1)	LRBT LTNT PNB‘L	[Stele dedicated] to the Lady Tinnīt-Phanebal
(1–2)	WL’/[DN] LB‘L ḤMN	and to the L[ord] Baal-hammon,
(2–3)	’Š NDR/’ [M]TNB‘L ’ŠT ‘BDM/LQRT	that [M]attanbal has vowed, the wife of Abdmilqart,
(4)	BN B‘LḤN’	the son of Baalhanno,
(4–5)	BN / BD‘ŠTRT	the grandson of Bodastart (Bostar);
(5)	K ŠM’ QL’	for He [the god] heard her [Mattanbal's] voice (prayer).
(6)	YBRK’	May He bless her!

== Bibliography ==
- von Maltzan, Heinrich (1869a). Sittenbilder aus Tunis und Algerien (in German). Dyk.
- von Maltzan, Heinrich (1869b). "§ 4. Inschrift zu Manuba". Reise auf der Insel Sardinien (in German). Dyk'sche Buchhandlung. pp. 583–586.
- von Maltzan, Heinrich (1870). "Anhang: Ueber die neuentdeckten phönicischen Inschriften von Karthago". Reise in den Regentschaften Tunis und Tripolis. Reise in den Regentschaften Tunis und Tripolis (in German). Dyk.
- Euting, Julius (1871). Punische Steine. Mémoires de l'Académie Impériale des Sciences de St.-Pétersbourg (in German). Académie impériale des sciences de St.-Pétersbourg.
- Euting, J. (1883). Sammlung der carthagischen inschriften. Sammlung der carthagischen inschriften (in German). K. J. Trübner.
- "TABULA TITULORUM VOTIVORUM; TANITIDI ET BAALI HAMMONI DICATORUM (180-3251.)". Corpus inscriptionum semiticarum (in Latin). Académie des Inscriptions et Belles-Lettres. 1890.
