= Carthaginian mother goddess inscription =

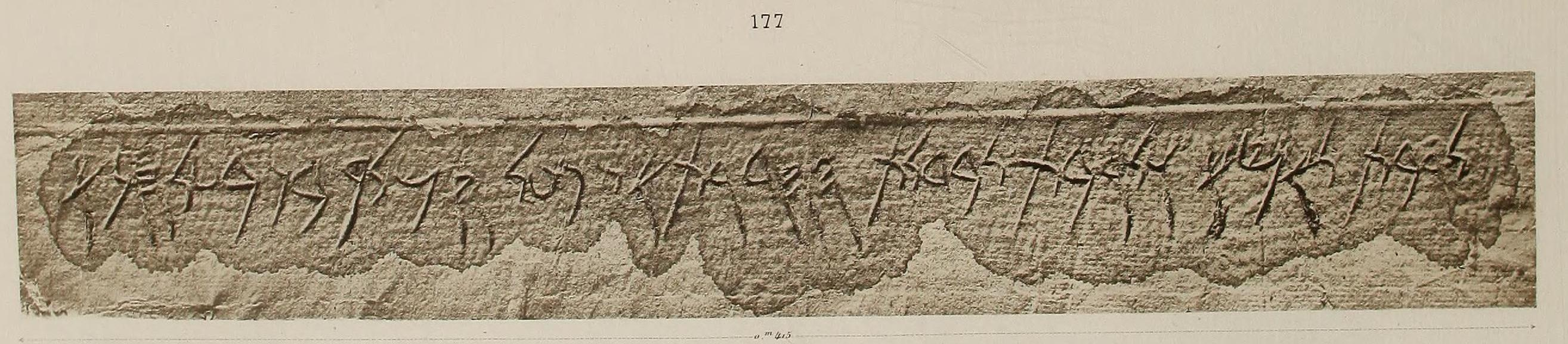
The Carthaginian mother goddess inscription in the Corpus Inscriptionum Semiticarum (CIS I 177)

The Carthaginian mother goddess inscription is a notable Punic inscription from Carthage published in 1871. One of about 140 inscriptions collected by Muhammad Khaznadar, it was first published by Julius Euting. Khaznadar was refused permission to make copies, but was passed copies of 19 inscriptions by E. Massé, Sidi Muhammed's secretary, and the consul Karl Tulin De La Tunisie. Euting had numbered it Carthage 215, having numbered his collection beginning at 120, picking up after the numbering published two years previously in 1869 by Paul Schröder in his Die Phönizische Sprache. It is known as CIS I 177, NSI 47, KAI 83 and KI 72.

== Inscription ==
𐤋𐤓𐤁𐤕 𐤋𐤀𐤌𐤀 𐤅𐤋𐤓𐤁𐤕 𐤋𐤁𐤏𐤋𐤕 𐤄𐤇𐤃𐤓𐤕 𐤀𐤔 𐤐𐤏𐤋 𐤇𐤌𐤋𐤓 𐤁𐤍 𐤁𐤏𐤋𐤇𐤍𐤀

To the lady Amma, and to the lady, mistress of the inner shrine (?) which HMLR, son of Ba'al-hanno, made.

== Bibliography ==
- Euting, Julius (1871). Punische Steine. Mémoires de l'Académie Impériale des Sciences de St.-Pétersbourg (in German). Académie impériale des sciences de St.-Pétersbourg.
- Moumni, Ridha (2020). "Archaeology and Cultural Policy in Ottoman Tunisia Part I: Muhammad Khaznadar (1865–70)". Muqarnas. 37. Brill: 265–289. doi:10.1163/22118993-00371P10. ISSN 0732-2992. JSTOR 27141540.
- Moumni, Ridha (December 6, 2021). "Archaeology and Cultural Policy in Ottoman Tunisia Part II: Muhammad Khaznadar (1871–99)". Muqarnas Online. 38 (1). Brill: 223–252. doi:10.1163/22118993-00381p08. ISSN 0732-2992.
