= Muhammad Khaznadar =

Tunisian archaeologist (1840–1929)

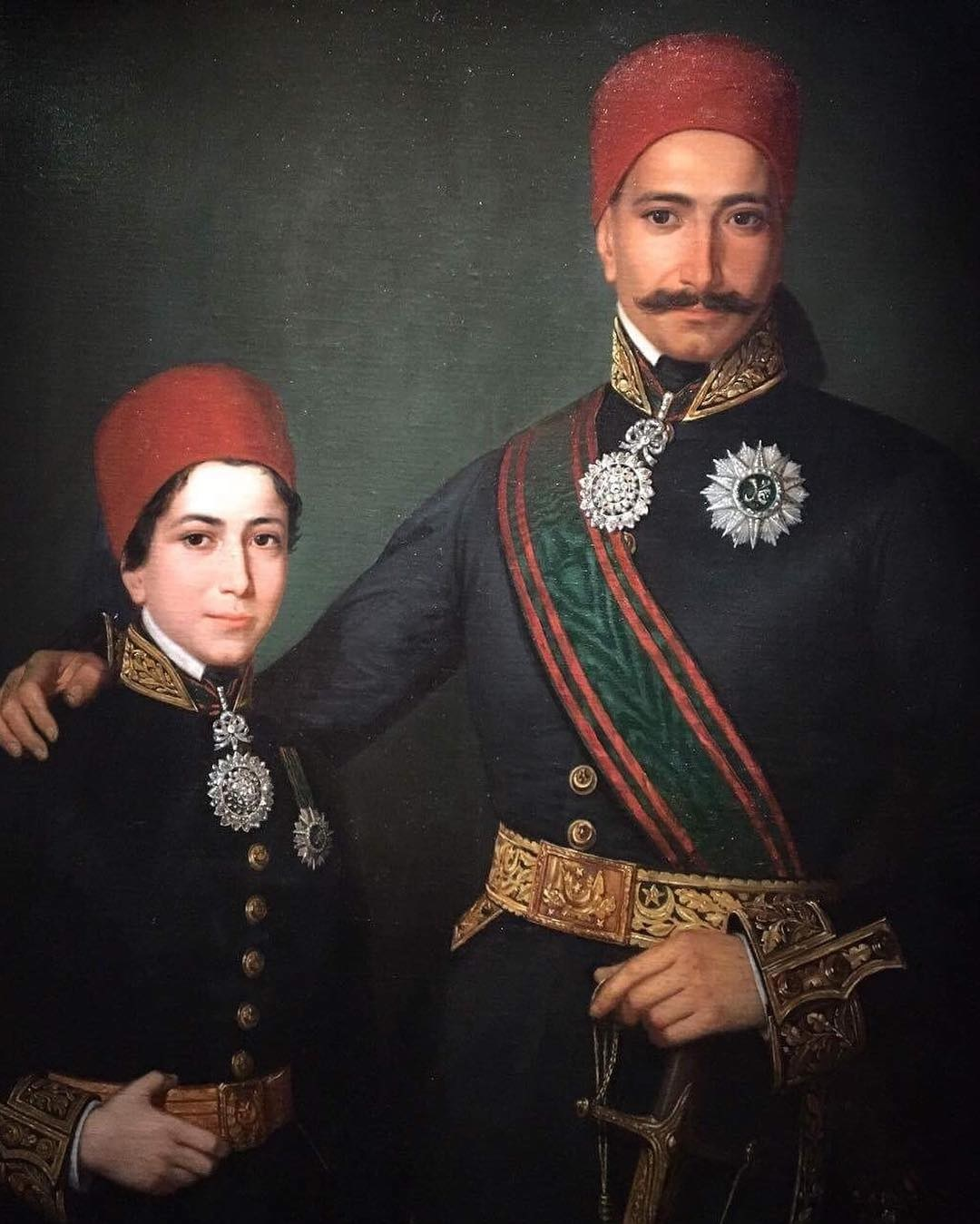
Muhammad Khaznadar, left, with his father Mustapha Khaznadar

Muhammad Khaznadar (1840–1929) was an early archaeologist in Tunisia. He was the eldest son of Mustapha Khaznadar, a prominent Prime Minister of Tunisia who served from 1855 until 1873.

Khaznadar was the first Tunisian to propose the founding of a museum, located in the Bardo Palace in the town of Manouba just outside Tunis. His collection was to form the kernel of the Bardo National Museum. Khaznadar's work also influenced the development of cultural policies in Tunisia in the years leading up to the establishment of the French protectorate in 1881.

As a native North African at the forefront of archaeology during the time of European colonialism, he has been compared to the Ottoman Osman Hamdi Bey and the Egyptian Rifa'a at-Tahtawi.

== Biography ==
Khaznadar was born into a wealthy family tied to the Tunisian ruling elite. His father, Mustapha Khaznadar, originally from the Greek island of Chios, had risen to become a leading figure in the Tunisian court. Muhammad received an education in Paris, where he was exposed to European culture, history, and archaeology. In Paris, he was a student of Ernest Desjardins.

After returning to Tunisia in 1865, Khaznadar became involved in the exploration and collection of antiquities. He was the first Tunisian to conduct modern archaeological excavations at Carthage, starting in 1866. His efforts led to the formation of a significant collection of antiquities, including Roman and Punic inscriptions, mosaics, and sculptures. Khaznadar established connections with European scholars and institutions. He communicated his discoveries to the Académie des Inscriptions et Belles-Lettres in Paris. However, his growing collection also led to tensions with foreign archaeologists and the French colonial authorities. Parts of his collection were exhibited at the Exposition Universelle (1867) in Paris and the 1873 Vienna World's Fair.

One of Muhammad Khaznadar's key achievements was his role in the founding of what would later become the Bardo National Museum. In 1866, he proposed the creation of a museum to house Tunisia's antiquities, to be located at the Manouba Palace, the residence of the Tunisian bey. The collection that Khaznadar amassed, including the Khaznadar inscriptions, a notable Bacchus statue, and other significant artifacts, formed the core of the museum's early holdings. German traveller Heinrich von Maltzan described the excitement that had developed around the museum in the late 1860s, describing that it: "in its specialty, Phoenician and Carthaginian antiquities, surpassed every other museum in the world":

The greatest of all, the all-powerful first minister, Sidi Mustapha Chasnadar. To see this dignitary himself was not the purpose of my visit, of course, nor did I even long to see his palace, but the motive which led me to the house of this great man was merely a scientific interest. The reader may be astonished. A scientific interest in a great man of Tunis! That would certainly be something unheard of. But as unheard of as it was, it was a fact that the eldest son of this minister owned a museum which, in its specialty, Phoenician and Carthaginian antiquities, surpassed every other museum in the world. How this little son of a great father came to display so much civilized spirit, which he is very far from possessing, according to outward appearances, and to render such an invaluable service to science without knowing it or wanting it, I can only explain by a wonderful act of Providence, which sometimes uses a donkey to carry relics.
Größten von Allen, des allmächtigen ersten Ministers, Sidi Mustapha Chasnadar, machte. Diesen Würdenträger selbst zu sehen, war nun freilich nicht der Zweck meines Besuches, nicht einmal seinen Palast sehnte ich mich in Augenschein zu nehmen, sondern die Triebfeder, welche mich in das Haus dieses großen Mannes führte, bildete lediglich ein wissenschaftliches Interesse. Der Leser mag staunen. Ein wissenschaftliches Interesse bei einem Großen von Tunis! Das wäre allerdings etwas Unerhörtes. Aber so unerhört, so war es doch Thatsache, daß der älteste Sohn dieses Ministers ein Museum besaß, welches in seiner Specialität, den phönicischen und karthagischen Alterthümern, jedes andere Museum der Welt übertraf. Wie dieser kleine Sohn eines großen Vaters dazu gekommen ist so viel civilisirten Geist, den er sehr weit entfernt ist zu besitzen, dem äußern Anschein nach an den Tag zu legen und, ohne es zu wissen oder zu wollen, der Wissenschaft einen so unschäzbaren Dienst zu leisten, das kann ich mir nur durch eine wunderbare Schickung der Vorsehung erklären, welche sich ja manchmal auch eines Esels zum Tragen von Reliquien bedient.

von Maltzen noted that the museum contained more than 120 Punic inscriptions (2/3 Punic and 1/3 neo-Punic) found during Khaznadar's excavations in three different points around the ruins of Carthage. He complained about the limited public access to the museum, such that it had “acquired the mysterious reputation of containing the greatest rarities of pagan and Christian literature”. Khaznadar's refusal to allow scholars to copy the inscriptions was attributed to a concern that "the value of his museum could be damaged by premature publication of his inscriptions". Taher Ghalia, Chief Curator of the Bardo, wrote that the foundation of the modern national museum by decree, on 25 March 1885, followed from the 1876–1877 “patrimonialization” policy of Hayreddin Pasha, who had succeeded Mustapha Khaznadar as Prime Minister. Hayreddin Pasha regulated archaeological work and ordered “the seizure of Mhammed Khaznadar’s private collection which was acquired fraudulently”.

== Gallery of his collection ==
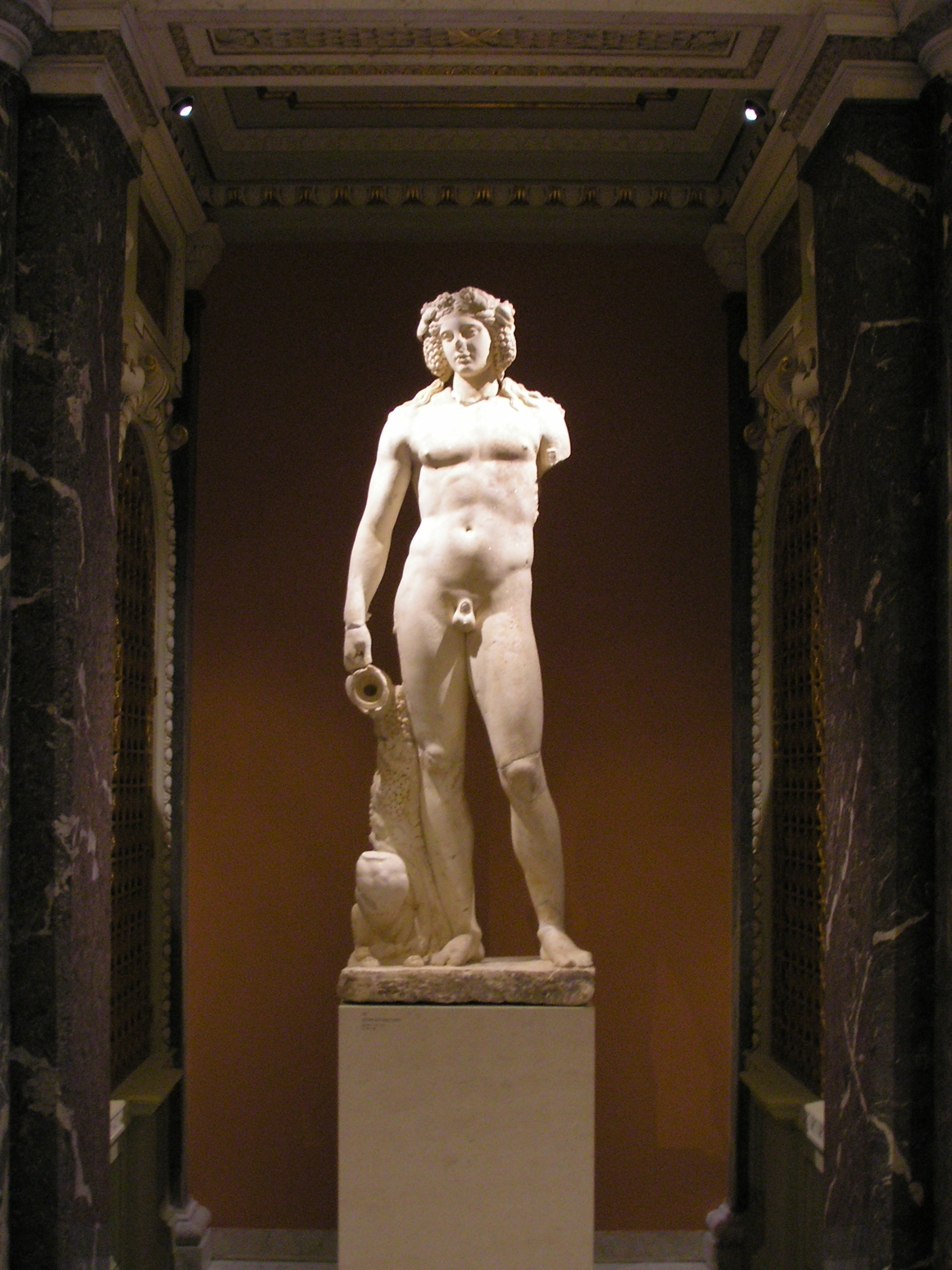
Statue of Bacchus, today in the Kunsthistorisches Museum, Vienna

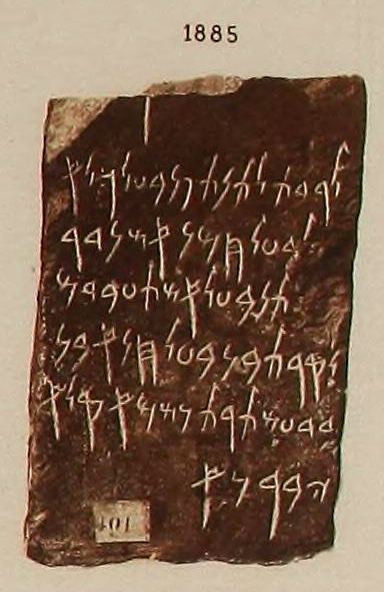
One of the Khaznadar inscriptions, today in the Louvre, known as KAI 88

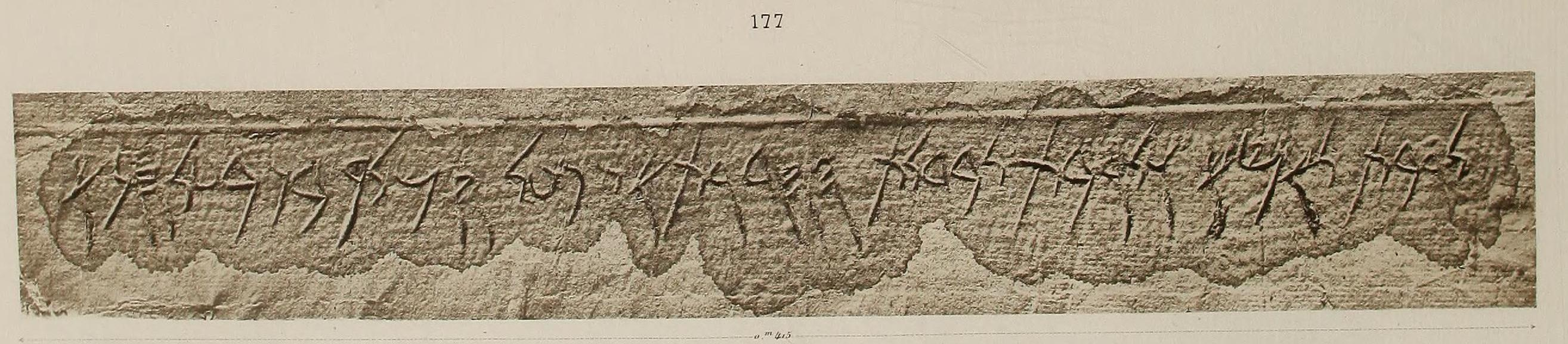
The Carthaginian mother goddess inscription, known as KAI 83

== Bibliography ==
- Laporte, Jean-Pierre (2002). "Les Pricot de Sainte-Marie, père et fils, et l'archéologie de la Tunisie et de Carthage". In Briand-Ponsart, Claude; Crogiez, Sylvie (eds.). L'Afrique du nord antique et médievale: Mémoire, identité et imaginaire (in French). Publications de l'Université de Rouen. pp. 207–273. ISBN 9782877759274.
- Moumni, Ridha (2020). "Archaeology and Cultural Policy in Ottoman Tunisia Part I: Muhammad Khaznadar (1865–70)". Muqarnas. 37. Brill: 265–289. doi:10.1163/22118993-00371P10. ISSN 0732-2992. JSTOR 27141540.
- von Maltzan, Heinrich (1869a). Sittenbilder aus Tunis und Algerien (in German). Dyk.
- von Maltzan, Heinrich (1869b). "§ 4. Inschrift zu Manuba". Reise auf der Insel Sardinien (in German). Dyk'sche Buchhandlung. pp. 583–586.
