= Julius Euting =

German orientalist

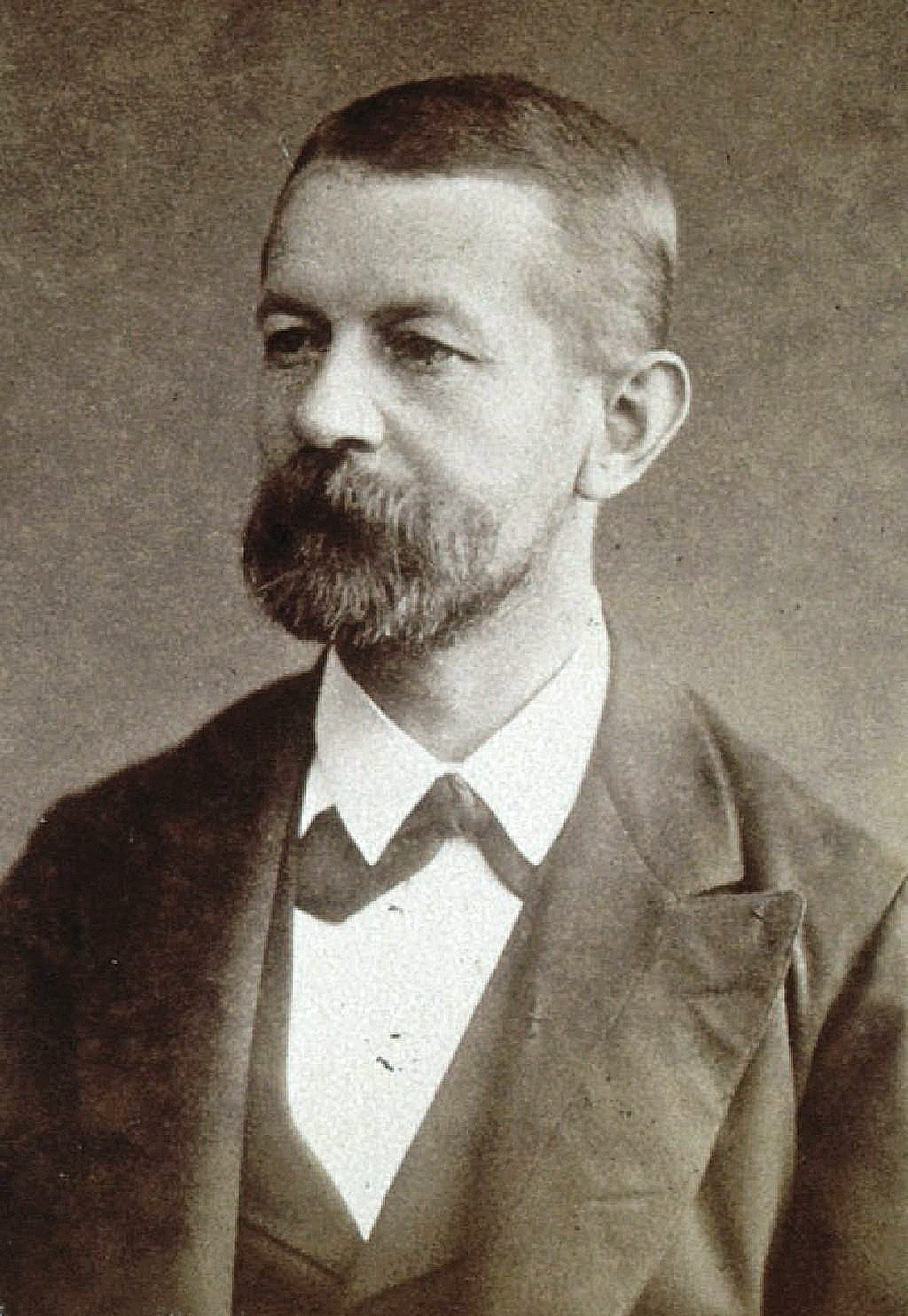
- Born: 11 July 1839; Stuttgart, Germany
- Died: 2 January 1913 (aged 73); Strasbourg, France
- Education: University of Tübingen
- Scientific career
- Fields: Orientalist
- Workplaces: University of Strasbourg

Julius Euting (11 July 1839 – 2 January 1913) was a German Orientalist.

== Life ==
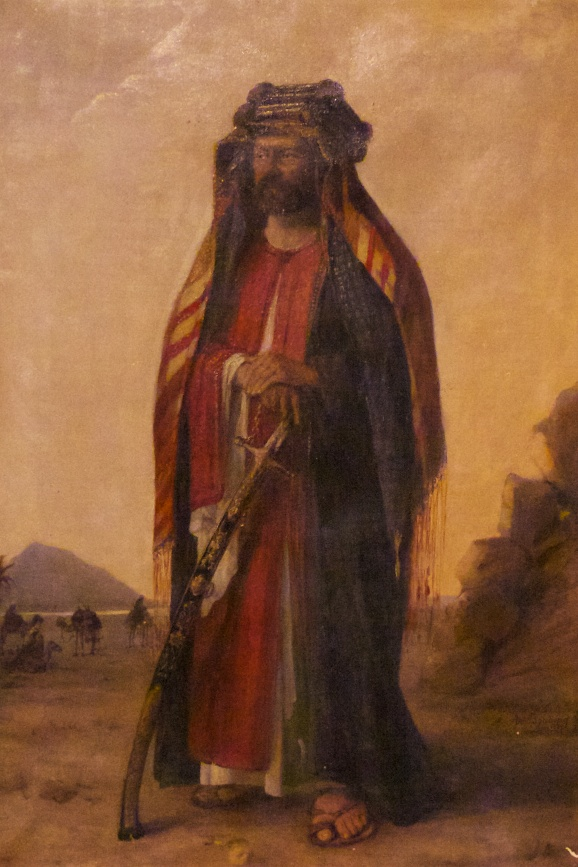
Euting in Bedouin dress, by Antonie Boubong (oil, 1886)

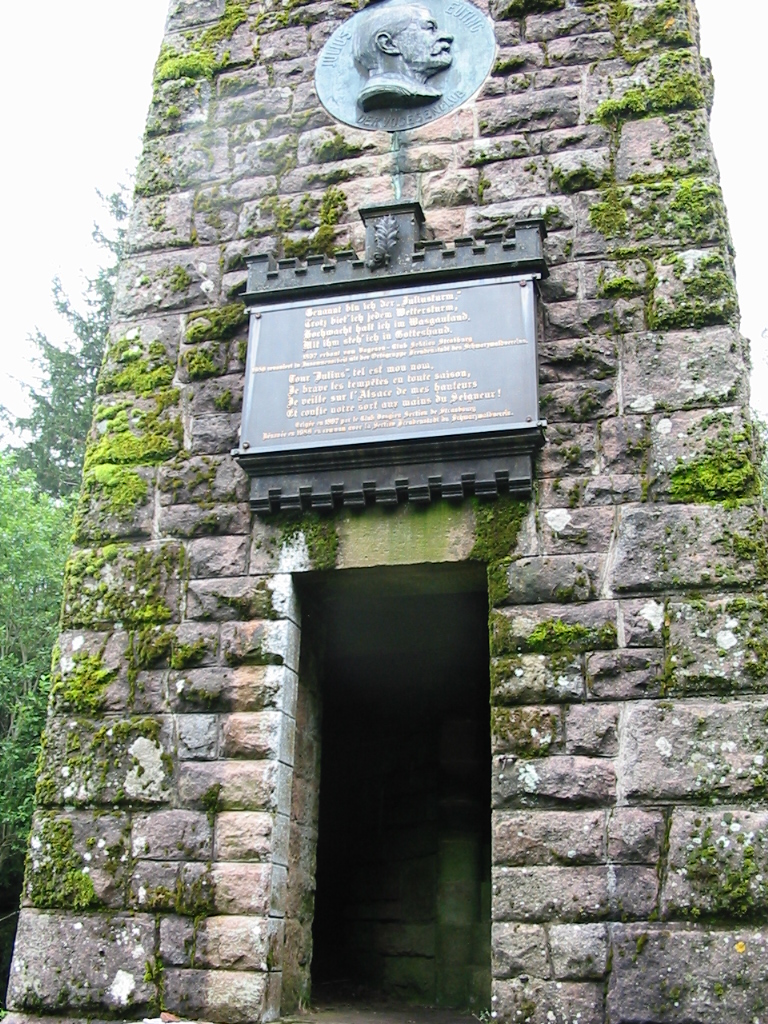
The Tour Julius in Climont

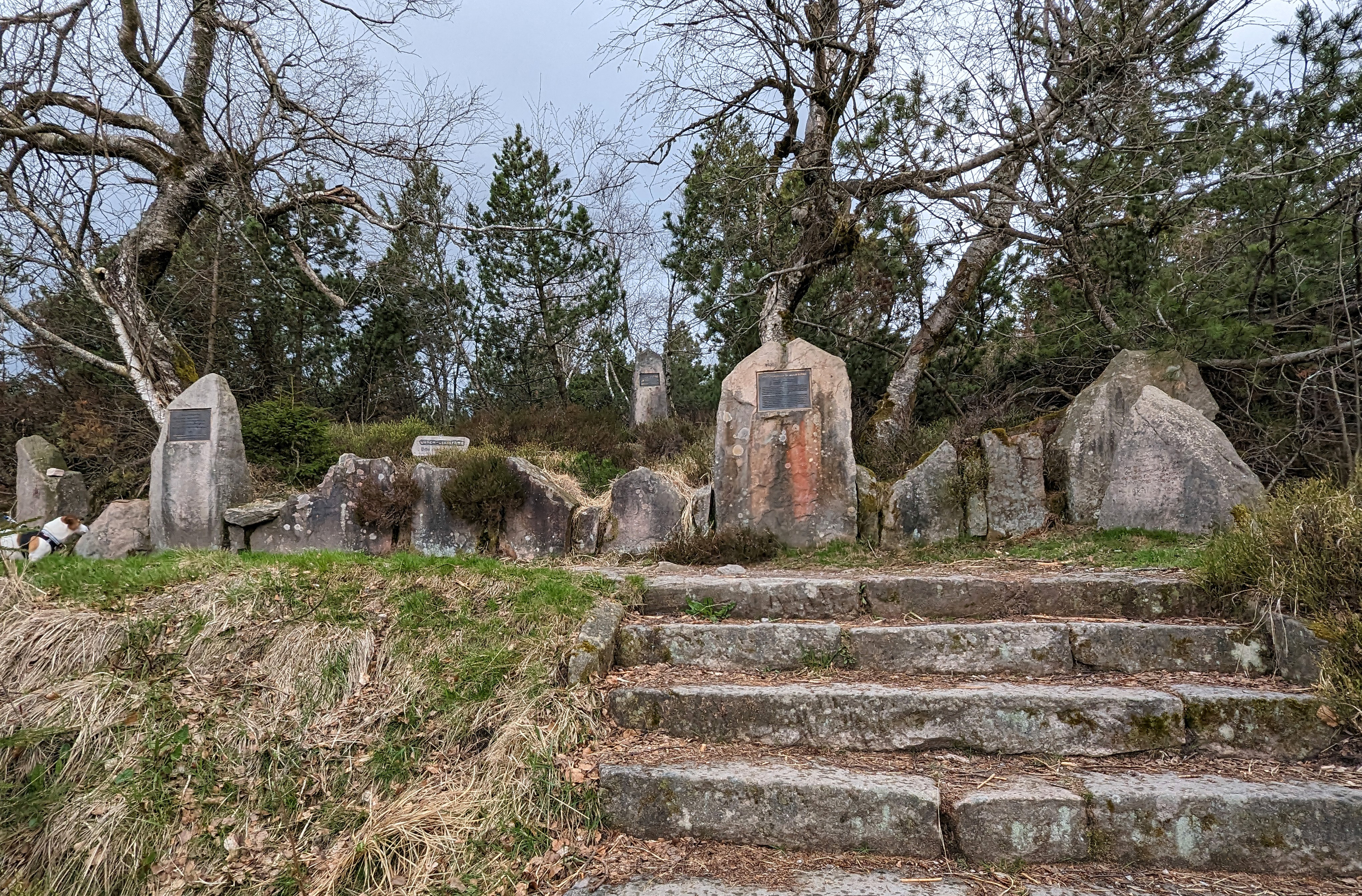
Urn grave of Julius Euting on the Seekopf (Black Forest)

Director of the National and University Library of Strasbourg, he completed his first studies at the Eberhard-Ludwigs-Gymnasium in Stuttgart and at the local seminary . He then studied Theology and Oriental Languages in Tübingen from 1857 to 1861.

Starting in 1867, he made numerous trips to Near and Middle East, especially Syria and Arabia. He worked on the Quran and published numerous bibliographic catalogs. He also published a tourist work on Strasbourg in 1903. He feigned a conversion to Islam, and, just like his colleague Christiaan Snouck Hurgronje, adopted an Arabic name, ʿAbd al-Wahhāb.

From 1876 to 1912 he was President of the Vogesenclub (in French Club Vosgien), on which he wrote a history. This association paid homage to him by dedicating the Tower overlooking the Climont to his name.

== Canaanite and Aramaic epigraphy ==
Euting made a significant contribution to the study of Canaanite and Aramaic inscriptions, particularly those in Phoenician and Punic, becoming the most cited name in the literature of Semitic epigraphy between c. 1875 and 1920. His "Script Tables" became widely renowned among Semitic scholars, and his copy of the Siloam inscription printed at the front of the Gesenius-Kautzsch Hebrew Grammar, has become familiar to generations of scholars in the field.

In addition to his own research, Euting collaborated with other scholars, often publishing articles on inscriptions provided by them or discovered in public collections, including the National Academic Library (Strasbourg). Among his notable contributions was the publications of the Dream ostracon and the Strasbourg Aramaic papyrus (TADAE A4.5 and D7.17), amongst the first known of the Elephantine papyri and ostraca, the Wilmanns Neopunic inscriptions, the Hadrumetum Punic inscriptions, the Tayma stones, the Tamassos bilinguals the Idalion Temple inscriptions, and the 38 Nabataean script funerary inscriptions from Hegra (Mada'in Salih). Euting's publications were widely referenced in the Corpus Inscriptionum Semiticarum (CIS), especially in relation to inscriptions numbered 180-3251, and his "Sammlung der carthagischen Inschriften" (Collection of Carthaginian Inscriptions) and "Punische Steine" (Punic Stones) are considered essential references in the field.

Mark Lidzbarski dedicated his seminal work, the "Handbuch" to both Euting and Theodor Nöldeke.

== Publications ==
=== Epigraphy ===
- 1864, Nachrichten über die mandäischen oder zabischen Manuscrr. der kaiserl. Bibliothek zu Paris und der Bibliothek des British Museum zu London', ZDMG 37: 120-36.
- 1867 Qolastā oder Gesänge und Lehren von der Taufe und dem Ausgang der Seele als mandäischer Text mit sämtlichen Varianten, nach Pariser und Londoner Manuscripten, mit Unterstützung der deutschen morgenländ: Gesellschaft in Leipzig, autographirt und hrsg. von J. Euting (Stuttgart: F. Schepperlen). (Commons file)
- 1871 Punische Steine (Mémoires de l'Académie Impériale de St Petersbourg 7/17/3; St Petersburg: Académie Impériale des Sciences).
- 1875 Sechs phönikische Inschriften aus Idalion (Strasbourg: Trübner).
- 1876 Inschriftliche Mittheilungen, Zeitschrift der Deutschen Morgenländischen Gesellschaft 29: 235-40.
- 1877 Katalog der kaiserlichen Universitäts- und Landesbibliothek in Strassburg. Arabische Literatur (Strasbourg: Trübner).
- 1883 Sammlung der carthagischen Inschriften, I (Strasbourg: Trübner).
- 1883 'Epigraphisches', ZDMG 37: 541-43.
- 1885 Nabatäische Inschriften aus Arabien (Berlin: Georg Reimer).
- 1885 Epigraphische Miscellen', Sitzungsberichte der Preussischen Akademie der Wissenschaften: 669-88.
- 1886 Ueber seine Reise in Inner-Arabien. 1883/84 (8. Mai 1886)', Verhandlungen der Gesellschaft für Erdkunde zu Berlin 13: 262-84.
- 1887 Epigraphische Miscellen', Sitzungsberichte der Preussischen Akademie der Wissenschaften: 407-22.
- 1891 Sinaïtische Inschriften (Berlin: Georg Reimer)
- 1896 Tagbuch einer Reise in Inner-Arabien, I (Leiden: E.J. Brill); reprint of the 1896 and 1914 Leiden edition, edited by Enno Littmann, Leiden, 1914 [Reprints u.a. Hildesheim, 2004, ISBN 3-487-12616-8.
- 1903 Notice sur un papyrus égypto-araméen de la Bibliothèque Impériale de Strasbourg (Extrait des Mémoires présentés à l'Académie des Inscriptions et Belles-Lettres; Paris: Imprimerie Nationale).
- 1904 Mandaeischer Diwan nach photographischer Aufnahme, von Dr. B. Pfoertner (Strasbourg: Trübner).
- 1904 ‘Séance du 19 août 1904', CRAIBL: 457-59.
- 1906 ‘Der Kamels-Sattel bei den Beduinen', in C. Bezold (ed.), Orientalische Studien Theodor Nöldeke zum siebzigsten Geburtstag (2. März 1906) gewidmet (2 vols.; Giessen: Alfred Töpelmann), I: 393-98.
- 1909 'Notulac Epigraphicae', in Florilegium ou Recueil de Travaux d'Érudition dédies à Monsieur le Marquis Melchior (Paris: Imprimerie Nationale): 230-39.
- 1914 Tagbuch diner Reise in Inner-Arabien, II (ed. E. Littmann; Leiden: E.J. Brill).

=== Notebooks ===
The notebooks from Euting's Middle Eastern travels are held in the University Library of Tübingen:

Date	Location	Notebooks (Md 676)
1869	Tunis and Carthage	1
1870	Turkey	2
1883-84	Syria and Arabia	18-23
1889	Egypt, Sinai, Palestine, Lebanon	4-6
1889-90	Syria and southern Turkey	7-10
1898	Transjordan (Petra)	11-13
1903	Palestine, Transjordan, Egypt	14-15
1905	Algiers, Tunis	16-17

=== Other ===
- Beschreibung der Stadt Strassburg und des Munsters, Strasbourg, 1881.

== Bibliography ==
- Healey, John (2023). "'Sicherheit Des Auges': The Contribution to Semitic Epigraphy of the Explorer Julius Euting (1839-1913)". Law and Religion between Petra and Edessa. London: Routledge. doi:10.4324/9781003420675-10. ISBN 978-1-003-42067-5.
- Hélène Lozachmeur et Françoise Briquel-Chatonnet, "Charles Huber und Julius Euting in Arabien nach französischen, auch heute noch nicht veröffentlichten Dokumenten", Anabases, n. 12, 2010, pp. 195–200.
- C. J. Lyall, «Julius Euting», in The Journal of the Royal Asiatic Society of Great Britain and Ireland (Cambridge), April 1913, pp. 505–510 (necrology).
