= Antonie Boubong =

German painter (1842–1908)

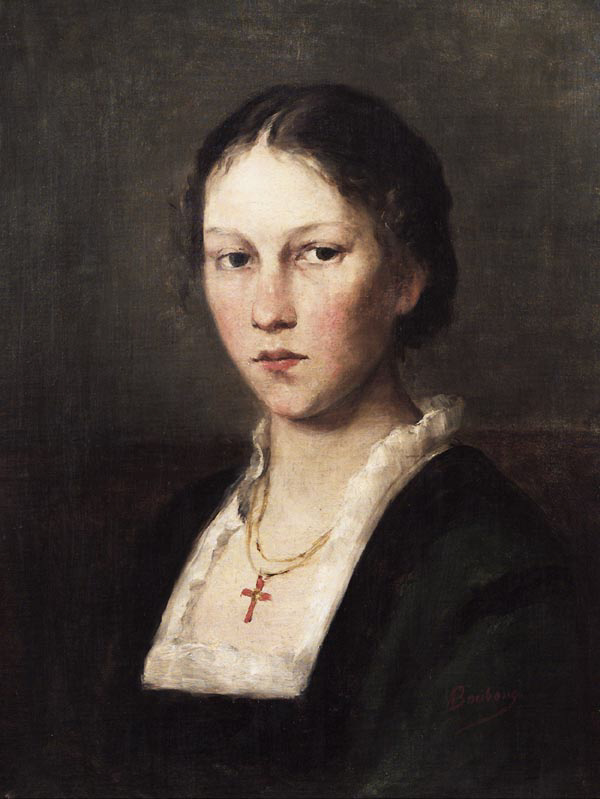
Portrait of a Girl. Oil on canvas, signed, 62 x 44 cm (1908)

Antonie Boubong (1842–1908) was a German portrait, genre, and landscape painter.

== Life ==
Boubong was born on 8 June 1842 in Werneck, Bavaria. She studied at the Stuttgart Art School with Wilhelm von Lindenschmit the Younger in Munich.

Boubong worked in Strasbourg. She had exhibitions in Munich, Berlin, Vienna, and Düsseldorf. She became nationally known when Kaiser William I and Empress Augusta presented one of the annual exhibitions organised by the Verein der Berliner Künstlerinnen at the Akademie der Künste and bought one of her paintings there.

== Gallery ==
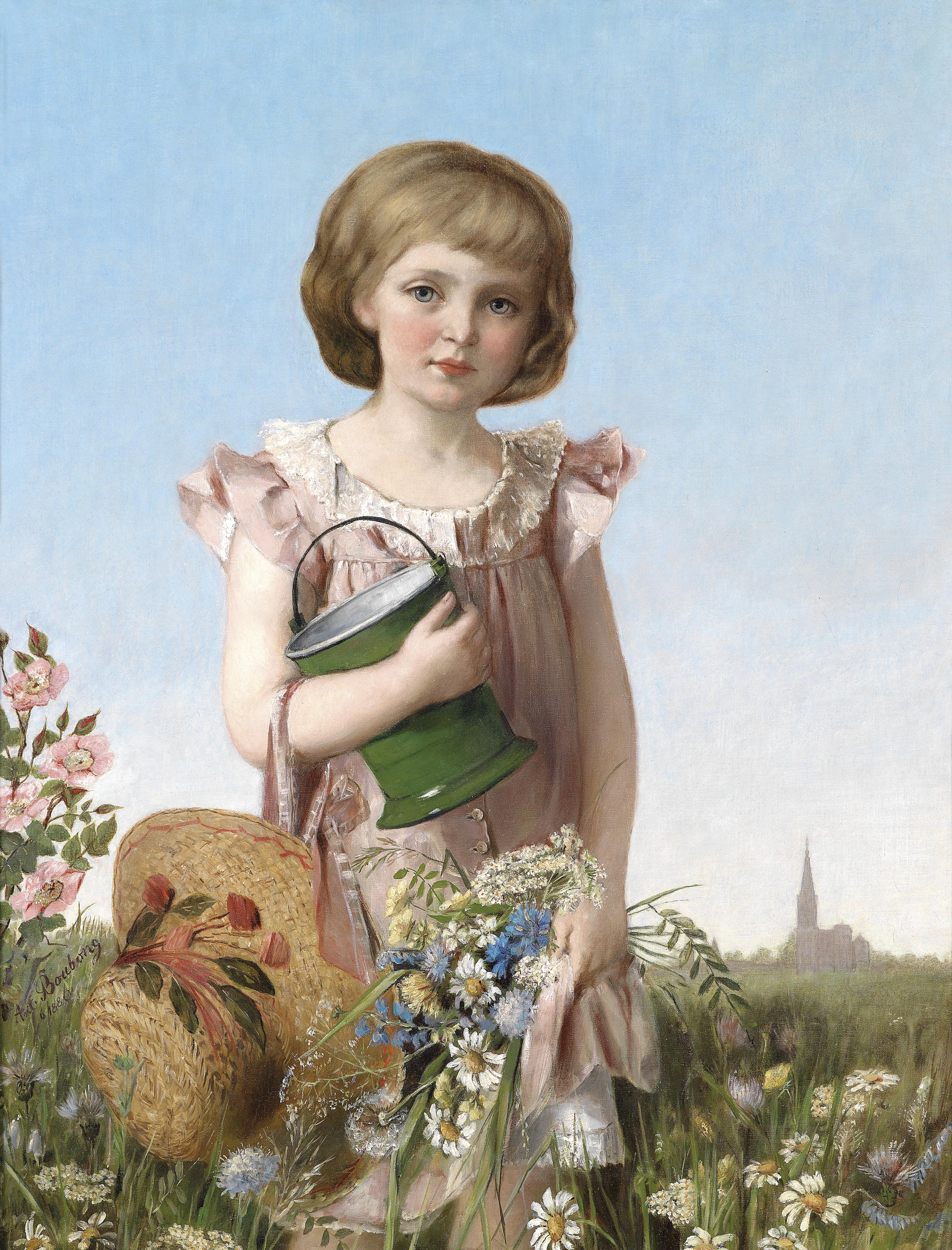
A Little Gardener, 1886

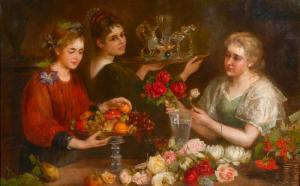
Women with Flowers and Fruit, 1899

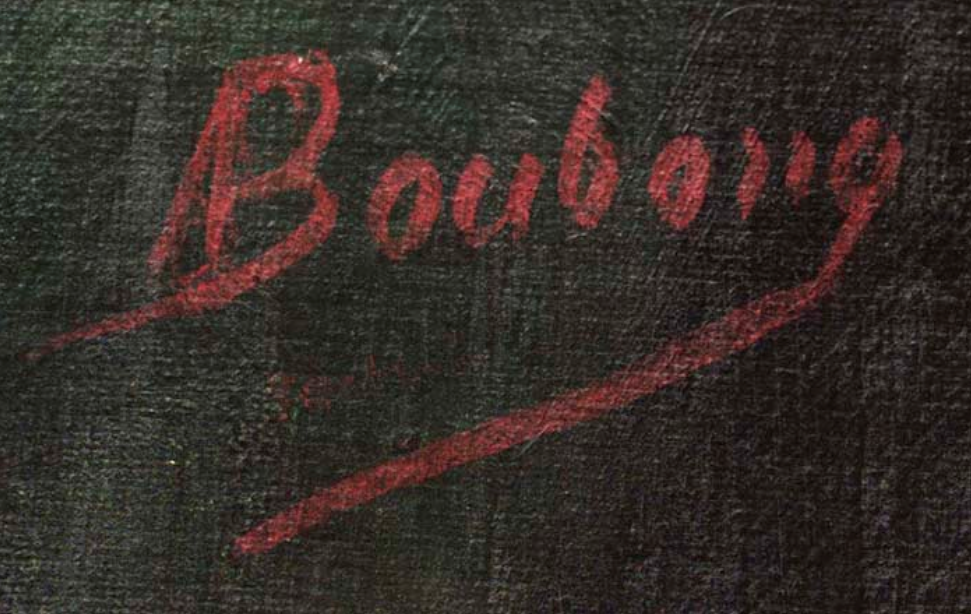
Signature
