= Heinrich von Maltzan =

German travel writer (1826–1874)

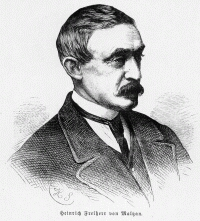
Heinrich von Maltzan

Heinrich Karl Eckard Helmuth von Maltzan (September 6, 1826 – February 23, 1874), also known as Heinrich Eckhard Carl Helmuth von Maltzan and by his title Baron of Wartenburg and Penzlin, was a German traveller.

== Life ==
Heinrich von Maltzan was born near Dresden. He studied law at Heidelberg, but on account of ill health spent much of his time from 1850 in travel.

He was a passionate traveller as well as an attentive observer and a good storyteller. Succeeding to his father's property in 1852, he extended the range of his journeys to Morocco and other parts of Barbary. Before his return home in 1854, he had also visited Egypt, Palestine, and other countries of the Levant. In 1856-1857 he was again in Algeria; in 1858 he reached the cities of Morocco; and in 1860 he succeeded in performing the pilgrimage to Mecca, which he afterwards described in Meine Wallfahrt nach Mekka (Leipzig, 1865). He had to flee for his life to Jidda without visiting Medina.

He then visited Aden and Bombay. After some two years of study in Europe, he again began to wander through the coasts and islands of the Mediterranean, repeatedly visiting Algeria. His first book of travel, Drei Jahre im Nordwesten von Afrika (Leipzig), appeared in 1863. It was followed by a variety of works and essays, popular and scientific. Maltzan's last book, Reise nach Südarabien (Brunswick, 1873), is chiefly valuable as a digest of much information about little-known parts of South Arabia collected from natives during a residence at Aden in 1870–1871. Among his other services to science must be noticed his collection of Punic inscriptions (Reise in Tunis und Tripolis, Leipzig, 1870), and the editing of Adolph von Wrede's remarkable journey in Hadramut (Reise in Hadramaut, &c., Brunswick, 1870).

After long suffering from neuralgia, Maltzan died by his own hand at Pisa.

== Works ==
- Drei Jahre im Nordwesten von Afrika: Reisen in Algerien und Marokko : 4 Bände (in German), Leipzig: Dürr, 1863
- Meine Wallfahrt nach Mekka. Reise in der Küstengegend und im Inneren von Hedschas : 2 Bände (in German), Leipzig: Dyk, 1865 Mehrere Neuauflagen, zuletzt Neudruck bei Olms, Hildesheim/Zürich/New York 2004 ISBN 3-487-12619-2.
- Reise auf der Insel Sardinien : Nebst einem Anhang: Über die phönicischen Inschriften Sardiniens (in German), Leipzig: Dyk, 1869 Neu herausgegeben von A. Stieglitz, Frankfurt am Main 2002, ISBN 3-8311-3565-7 (Book-on-Demand).
- Reise in die Regentschaften von Tunis und Tripolis : 3 Bände (in German), Leipzig: Dyk, 1870
- Reise nach Südarabien und Geographische Forschungen im und über den südwestlichen Theil Arabiens (in German), Braunschweig: Vieweg, 1873 Neudruck: Olms, Hildesheim 2004 ISBN 3-487-12622-2.
