= Bodashtart inscriptions =

Phoenician inscriptions from the 6th century BC

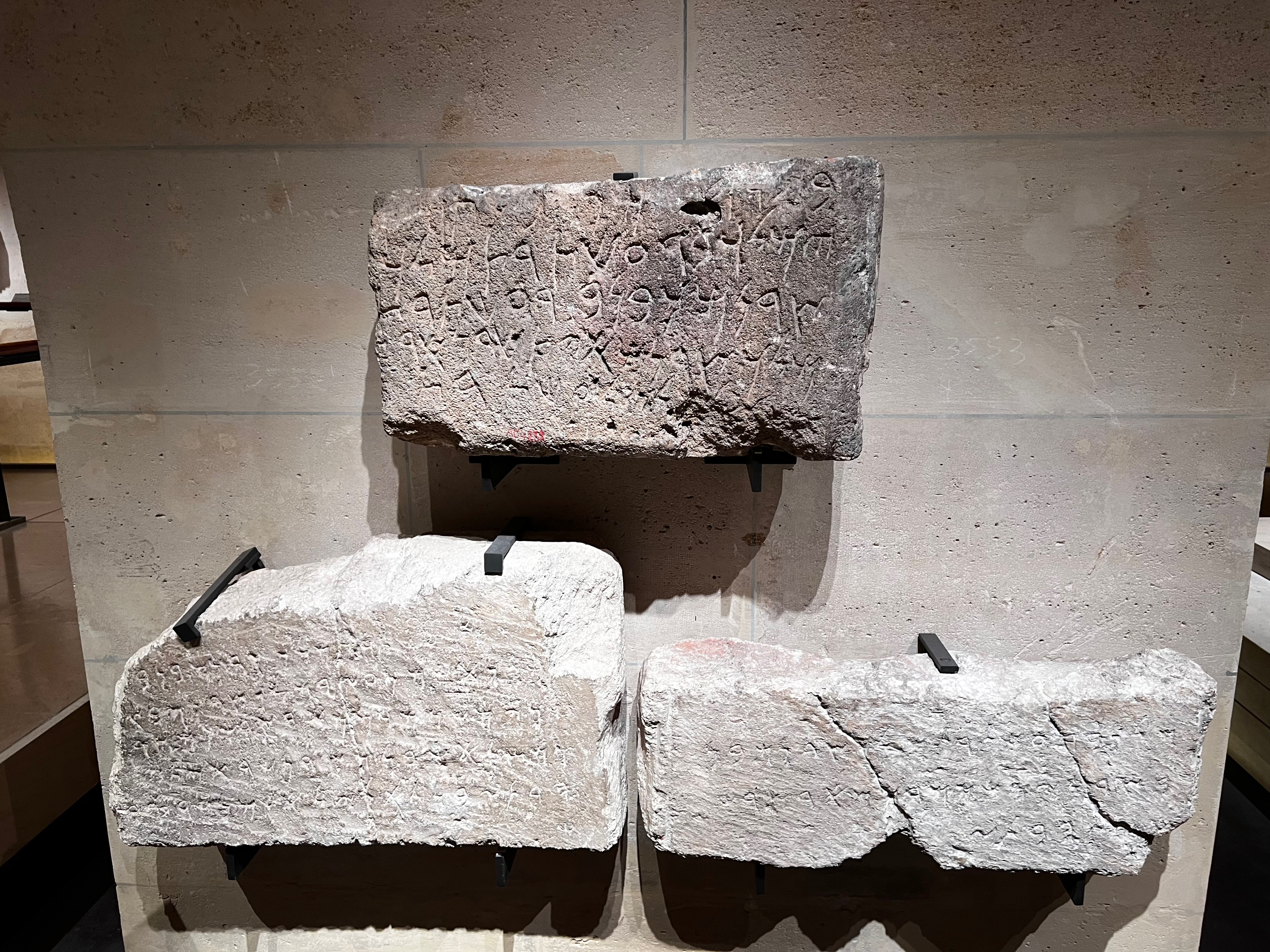
Three of the Bodashtart inscriptions on display at the Louvre (AO 4838, AO 3552, AO 3553)

The Bodashtart inscriptions are a well-known group of between 22 and 24 Phoenician inscriptions from the 6th century BC referring to King Bodashtart.

The first known inscription was CIS I 4, said to be found in 1858 in a wall near Sidon.

Subsequently, two series of inscriptions were found in the early 20th century at the Temple of Eshmun, near Sidon in Lebanon, immediately before and during the excavations there. They are known as KAI 15 and 16. One of these set of inscriptions refers to only the name of Bodashtart (KAI 15), and the other refers to both Bodashtart and his heir Yatan-milk (KAI 16).

In 2004 another significant inscription was reconstructed.

== CIS I 4 ==
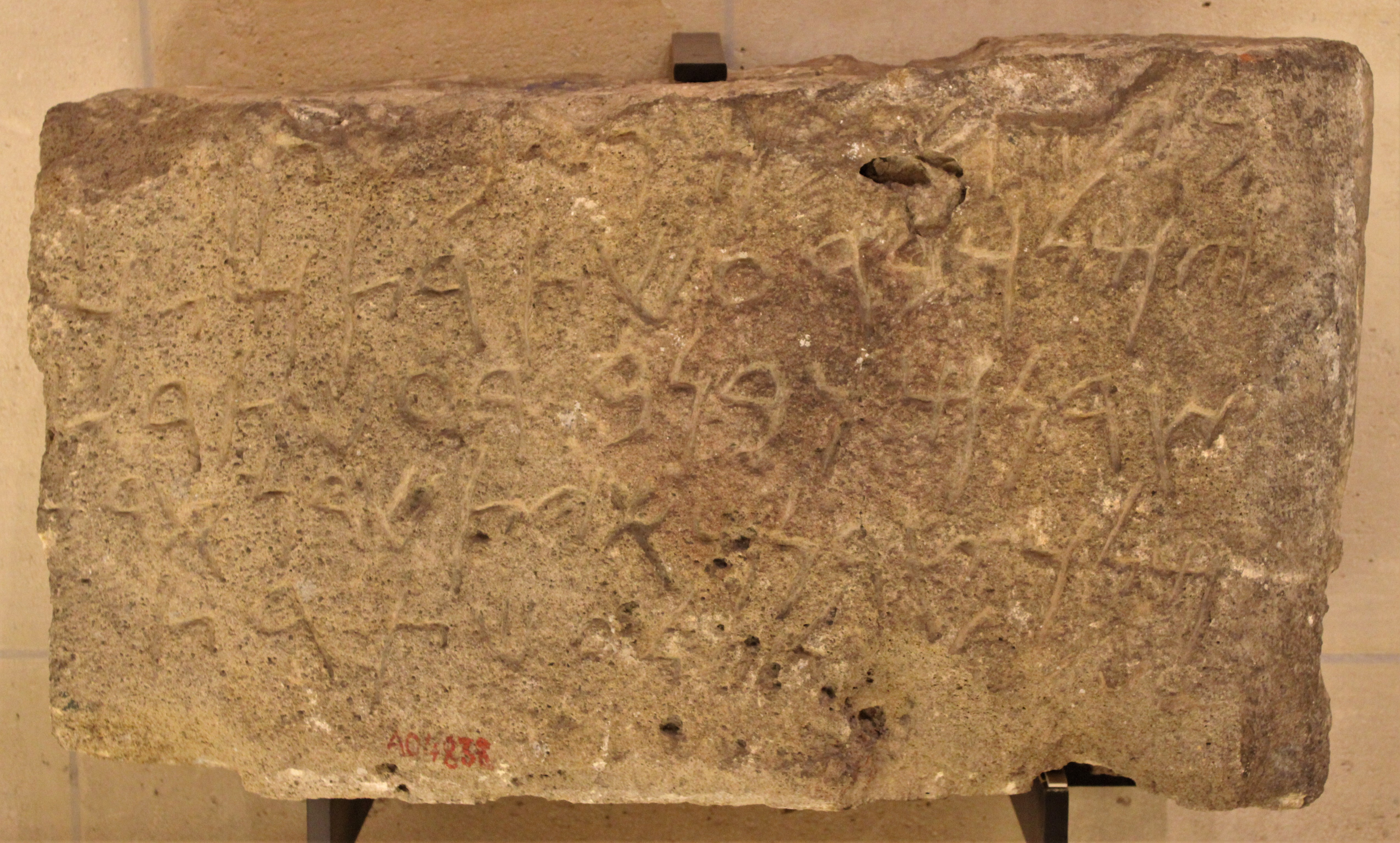
The first known Bodashtart inscription, known today as CIS I 4, currently in the Louvre as AO 4838

This was the earliest known Bodashtart inscription, and is a unique text. The dedication is to Astarte rather than to Eshmun like the other inscriptions.

The inscription reads:

(line 1)	BYRḤ [.]MP[‘] BŠT M[LK-]	In the month of *MP‘ in the (first?) year of the r[eig-]
(2)	-Y MLK BD‘ŠTRT MLK	-n of king Bod‘astart, king of the
(3)	ṢDNM KBN BD‘ŠTRT	Sidonians, he, Bod‘astart
(4)	MLK ṢDNM ’YT ŠRN ’R[Ṣ]	the king of the Sidonians, dedicated(?) plain of lan[d]
(5)	[Z] L[’]LY L‘ŠTRT	[this] to his [g]od, to ‘Astarte.

== KAI 15 / RES 766 ==
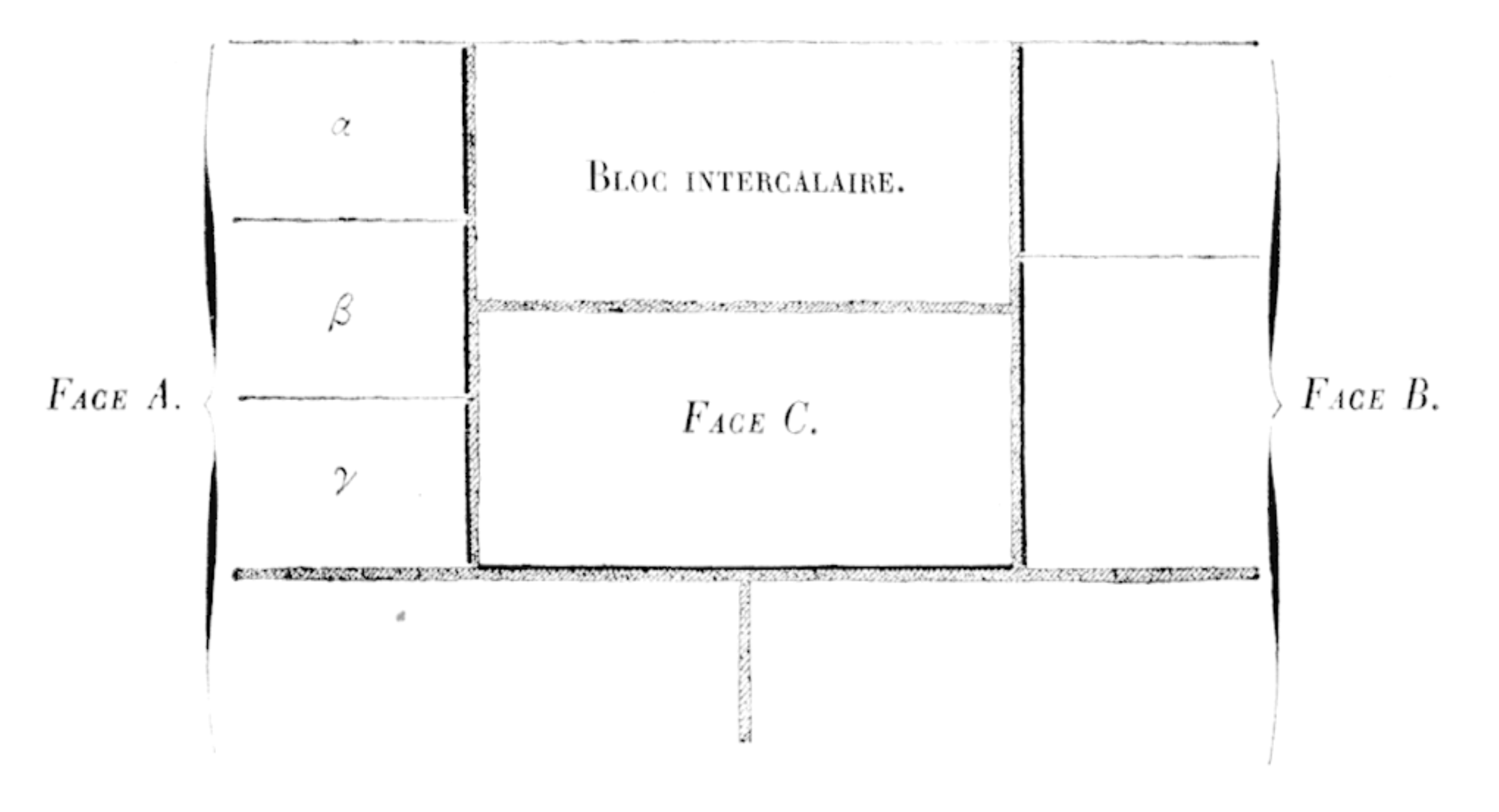
Philippe Berger's 1904 diagram of the first six known inscriptions. Face A: three blocks, each bearing an inscription, Together, they formed a stele about 2 x 1.5m, which gave the impression of the inscription continuing from one to the other. Upper stone (α) is AO 3553 (2 1/2 lines). Middle stone (β) is AO 3552 (4 1/2 lines). Lower stone (γ) is in two fragments (4 1/2 lines). Face Β: Two inscriptions on two undivided blocks Face C: One inscription (2 1/2 lines)

This group of inscriptions, each with text similar to the others, was published together in the Répertoire d'Épigraphie Sémitique as RES 766. They were edited in detail by Philippe Berger in 1904.

The inscription reads:

MLK BD‘ŠTRT MLK ṢDNM BN BN MLK ’ŠMN‘ZR	King Bod‘astart, King of the Sidonians, the son of the son of King Eshmūn‘azor,
MLK ṢDNM BṢDN YM	king of Sidonians in Sidon-of-the-Sea,
ŠMM RMM ’RṢ RŠPM ṢDN MŠL ’Š BN WṢDN ŠD (or ŠR?)	High-Heavens, Rasapim-Land, (and) Sidon, that he built, and (in) Sidon-of-the-Field (inland or rural Sidon).
’YT HBT Z BN L’LY L’ŠMN ŠD (or ŠR?) QDŠ	He built this temple for his god Eshmūn of the Holy Field(?).

The discovery was made by four workers who were extracting blocks from the temple on behalf of Druze leader Nassib Jumblatt (see Jumblatt family). They noticed that certain blocks had inscriptions with the engravings painted in red. A local antiques dealer bought three of the stones all with the same inscription. Due to the enormous size of the blocks, they were cut down to just 15 or 20 cm in thickness, and some stones were also cut into two or three pieces.

A number of forgeries were subsequently produced.

The excavated wall had two layers of construction: the inner layer showed more careful assembly of the blocks; the KAI 16 inscriptions were on the inside face of the blocks, such that they were not initially visible.

Inscription	Discovered	Current Location	Inventory Code	Image	Ref.
A (RES 287)	1900	Louvre (on display)	AO 3552		
B (RES 288)	1900	Louvre (on display)	AO 3553		
C (RES 289)	unknown	unknown			
D (RES 290, 291, 294)	1900	Louvre	AO 4078		
E (RES 292)	1900	Istanbul Archaeology Museums			
F (RES 293, 296)	1901	Istanbul Archaeology Museums	Inv. 1457		
G	1903	Istanbul Archaeology Museums	Inv. 1486		
H	1903	Istanbul Archaeology Museums	Inv. 1488		
I	1903	Istanbul Archaeology Museums			
RES 1200	1900	Louvre (claimed to be a forgery)	AO 4077		

== KAI 16 / RES 767 ==
This group of inscriptions, each with text similar to the others, was published together in the Répertoire d'Épigraphie Sémitique as RES 767. They were edited in detail by Wilhelm Freiherr von Landau in 1904.

The inscriptions read:

MLK BD‘ŠTRT WBN ṢDQ YTNMLK	King Bod‘astart and his legitimate son Yatonmilk,
MLK ṢDNM BN BN MLK ’ŠMN‘ZR MLK ṢDNM	King of the Sidonians, the son of the son of king Esmūnazor, king of the Sidonians:
’YT HBT Z BN L’LY L’ŠMN ŠD (or ŠR?) QDŠ	he built this temple for his god Eshmūn of the Holy Field(?).

The KAI 16 inscriptions were found in the eastern part of the wall, in the outer layer of blocks, which had been placed less carefully than the inner layer. Again, the inscriptions were turned inwards (walled in) so that they could not be seen.

Inscription	Discovered	Current Location	Inventory Code	Image	Ref.
A (RES 507)	1902	AUB Museum			
B	1904	Istanbul Archaeology Museums			
C	1904	Istanbul Archaeology Museums	Inv. 3538		
D	1904	Istanbul Archaeology Museums			
E	1904	Istanbul Archaeology Museums			
F	1904	Istanbul Archaeology Museums			
G	1904	Istanbul Archaeology Museums			
H	1904	Istanbul Archaeology Museums			
I	1904	Istanbul Archaeology Museums			
K	1904	in situ (may be the Contenau inscriptions)			
Contenau I	1920	in situ	n.a.		
Contenau II	1920	in situ	n.a.		
Contenau III	1920	in situ	n.a.		

== Bodashtart's water channel project ==
A fourth Bodashtart inscription, comprising eleven lines, was described by Paolo Xella and José-Ángel Zamora in 2004. The inscription had been discovered and photographed by Maurice Chéhab around 1960 on a rocky bank of the Awali river, some three kilometers from the mouth of the river, in an area where later an electric power plant was built. The in situ inscription seems to exist no longer, and Chéhab had never published it. But Xella and Zamora succeeded in tracking down Chéhab's photographs, and they conclude that the inscription probably refers to the construction of a water channel to bring water from the Awali river to the Eshmun temple complex northeast of Sidon, with its ritual ablution basins. Bodashtart had considerably enlarged this temple complex, so the local Yidlal water source would probably no longer be sufficient to meet its increased water needs.

The inscription is dated to ca. 520 BCE. It reads:

(line 1)	[BY]RḤ ZBḤ ŠM[Š BŠ]NT ŠB‘ IIIIIII LMLKY MLK BD‘ŠTRT	[In the mo]nth of Zebaḥ-Šama[š], [in ye]ar seven 1+1+1+1+1+1+1 of (the) reign of King Bod‘ashtart,
(2)	[M]LK [ṢD]N[M BN] B[N] MLK ’ŠMN‘ZR MLK ṢDNM BṢDN [Y]M	[k]ing of the [Sido]n[ians, son of the s]on of King Eshmun‘azor, king of the Sidonians, (king) in Sidon-of-the-Se[a],
(3)	ŠMM RMM ’RṢ RSPM WṢDN ŠD KBN W’Š <BN>(?) P‘L MLK BD‘ŠTRT MLK ṢDNM ’YT	(in) High-Heavens, (in) Rasapim-Land, and (in) Sidon-of-the-Field. This is what he built and that he has made, King Bod‘ashtart, king of the Sidonians:
(4)	...] NBL Z Y ’[.. ’]ŠMN ŠR QDŠ B‘N YDLL LKNNM HMM [...] ’L(?) ’Š ŠQ [? ...	...] this «NBL» (water channel?) [... of(?) E]shmun the Holy Prince, at the YDLL source,
(5)	...]LMB [... ...] ’ŠMN W’YT ’ŠR ’ŠT(?) WP‘L BNM ’YT [...	...] in [... (of?)] Eshmun, and the place of a pillar(?). And he has made in them (?; or: and he has made buildings ...) [...
(6)	... ... ...] ’SMN W’YT ŠRYT ’Š TḤT ’[...	... (of?)] Eshmun, and the architraves that are below the [...
(7)	MLK(?)] ’ŠMN‘ZR [...]GMMB‘D[... ...] RBM ’[...]BRNMŠ[.]‘[.]T	king?] Eshmun‘azor [... ...] many(?) [... ...
(8)	Y[L?]M [W?]’Š Y‘BD [MM(?) ... ...	... and] who may serve [water? ...
(9)	...]’Y[T’(?)]Š YŠ[.]K[... ...]MY[..]Ḥ[...	?? (translation impossible, only a few single letters are readable)
(10)	...]T[...	?? (translation impossible, only a few single letters are readable)
(11)	...]	?? (translation impossible, only a few single letters are readable)

== Chronology ==
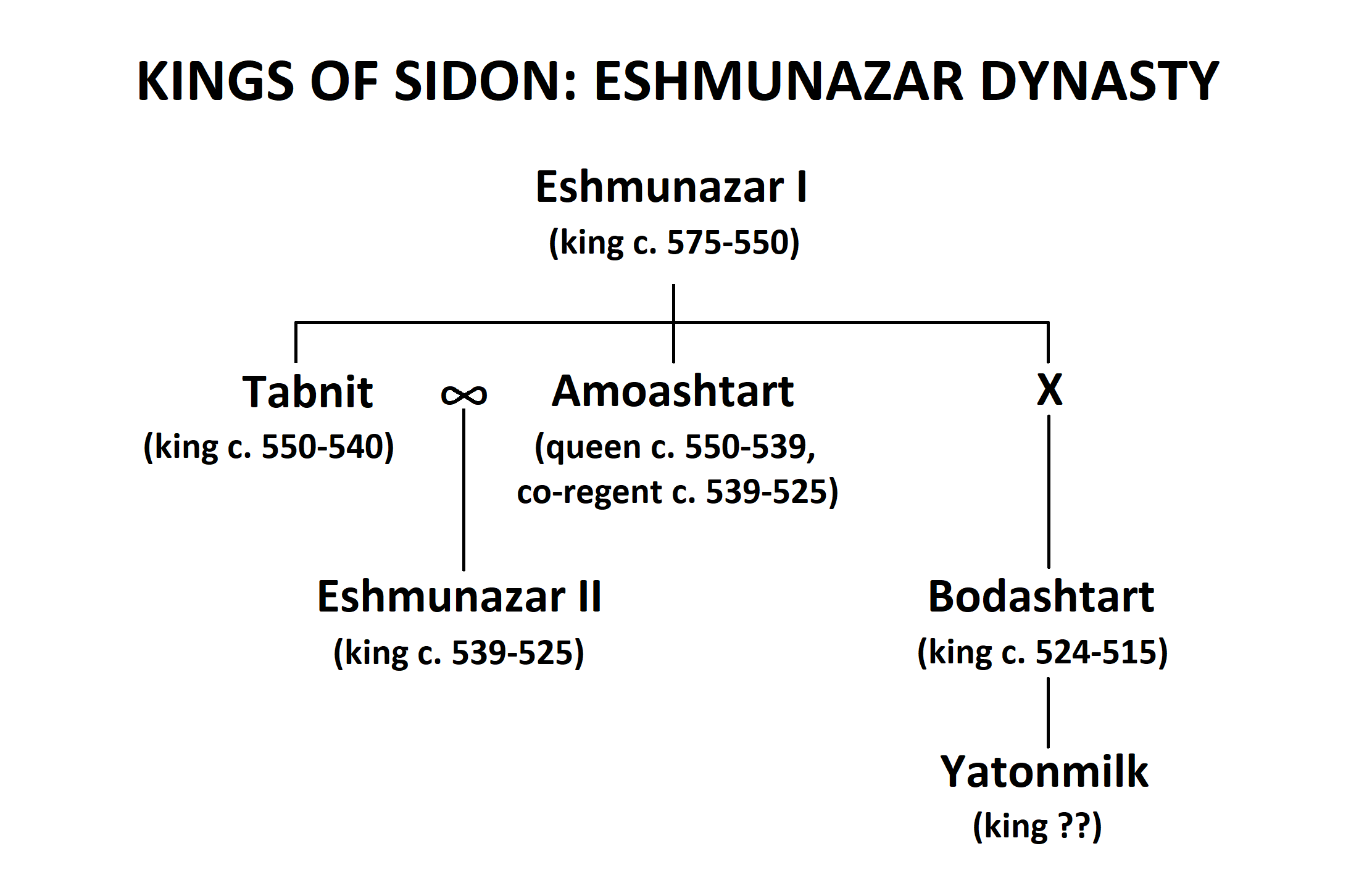
Kings of Sidon: the Eshmunazar dynasty

The chronology of Bodashtart's inscriptions and of his reign have been sketched by P. Xella and J.Á. Zamora López. In fact, they suggest that sources are now abundant enough that we may be on the threshold of being able to write Bodashtart's biography.

The oldest inscription is CIS I 4, dating from the king's first reignal year. It describes the dedication of a plot of land to Astarte—a fitting activity for kings of Sidon, who also were high priests—, but Bodashtart had not yet completed any building activities. The king, who was only a cousin of the last king Eshmunazar II, may have tried to justify an illegal succession by stressing his religious sense of duty, and by also mentioning his being a grandson of Eshmunazar I.

Next, the canal inscription dates from the seventh year of his reign. In the intervening five years Bodashtart had finished an extensive building program at the Eshmun temple, and probably also in the three urban districts mentioned in the inscription.

A few years later Bodashtart in KAI 15 records his building activities in those three districts, and also in a fourth urban district, appropriately called "Sidon of the Ruler".

KAI 16 dates from a few more years later. Only the building of the temple complex for Eshmun is mentioned. In this inscription Bodashtart for the first time mentions his son Yatonmilk, whom he explicitly calls a legitimate successor to the throne. This may be indicative of some uneasiness about his own rightfulness as a king. It is not known whether Yatonmilk ever has actually become king of Sidon.

Between 575 and 400 BCE no less than twelve names of rulers of Sidon are known (among them one queen-regent, Amoashtart). Bodashtart was the fifth of them, his regnal years cannot have been many, probably from c. 525 till c. 515. His accession may then have been related to a military campaign of the Persian king Cambyses II in 525 BCE, that ended in Cambyses's conquest of Egypt.
