= Eshmunazar I =

Phoenician king of Sidon (6th century BC)

King of Sidon
- Reign: c. 575 BC – c. 550 BC
- Predecessor: Not documented
- Successor: Tabnit I
- Issue: Tabnit I Amoashtart
- Phoenician language: 𐤀𐤔𐤌𐤍𐤏𐤆𐤓
- Dynasty: Founder of his namesake dynasty
- Religion: Canaanite polytheism

Eshmunazar I (Phoenician: 𐤀𐤔𐤌𐤍𐤏𐤆𐤓 ʾšmnʿzr, a theophoric name meaning 'Eshmun helps') was a priest of Astarte and the Phoenician King of Sidon (r. c. 575 – c. 550 BC). He was the founder of his namesake dynasty, and a vassal king of the Achaemenid Empire. Eshmunazar participated in the Neo-Babylonian campaigns against Egypt under the command of either Nebuchadnezzar II or Nabonidus. The Sidonian king is mentioned in the funerary inscriptions engraved on the royal sarcophagi of his son Tabnit I and his grandson Eshmunazar II. The monarch's name is also attested in the dedicatory temple inscriptions of his other grandson, King Bodashtart.

== Etymology ==
Eshmunazar is the Romanized form of the Phoenician theophoric name 𐤀𐤔𐤌𐤍𐤏𐤆𐤓, meaning "Eshmun helps".

== Chronology ==
The absolute chronology of the Kings of Sidon from the dynasty of Eshmunazar I has been much discussed in the literature; traditionally placed in the course of the fifth century BC, inscriptions of this dynasty have been dated back to an earlier period on the basis of numismatic, historical and archaeological evidence. The most complete work addressing the dates of the reigns of these Sidonian kings is by the French historian Josette Elayi who shifted away from the use of biblical chronology. Elayi used extant documentation, including inscribed Tyrian seals and stamps excavated by the Lebanese archaeologist Maurice Chehab in 1972 from Jal el-Bahr, a neighborhood in the north of Tyre, Phoenician inscriptions discovered by the French archaeologist Maurice Dunand in Sidon in 1965, and the systematic study of Sidonian coins. (Note: Sidonian coins were the first coins to bear minting dates in antiquity based on the years of reign of the kings.) According to her work Eshmunazar reigned from c. 575 BC to c. 550 BC.

== Historical context ==
Sidon, which was a flourishing and independent Phoenician city-state, came under Mesopotamian occupation in the ninth century BC. The Assyrian king Ashurnasirpal II (883–859 BC) conquered the Lebanon mountain range and its coastal cities, including Sidon.

In 705, the Tyrian king Luli joined forces with the Egyptians and Judah in an unsuccessful rebellion against Assyrian rule, but was forced to flee to Kition with the arrival of the Assyrian army headed by Sennacherib. Sennacherib instated Ittobaal on the throne of Sidon, and reimposed the annual tribute. When Abdi-Milkutti ascended to Sidon's throne in 680 BC, he also rebelled against the Assyrians. In response, the Assyrian king Esarhaddon captured and beheaded Abdi-Milkutti in 677 BC after a three-year siege; Sidon was stripped of its territory, which was awarded to Baal I, the king of rival Tyre and loyal vassal to Esarhaddon.

== Reign ==
Little is known about Eshmunazar I's reign. According to Elayi, Eshmunazar was a usurper since, unlike the customs of the Phoenician royalty, the name of his father is not mentioned in any of the royal inscriptions. Eshmunazar participated in the Neo-Babylonian campaigns against Egypt under the command of either Nebuchadnezzar II or Nabonidus. The Sidonian king seized Egyptian stone sarcophagi belonging to members of the Egyptian elite; three of these sarcophagi were unearthed in the royal necropolis of Sidon.

== Epigraphic mentions ==
Eshmunazar I is mentioned in the funerary inscriptions engraved on the royal sarcophagi of his son Tabnit and his grandson Eshmunazar II. The monarch's name is also attested in the dedicatory temple inscriptions of his other grandson, King Bodashtart.

== Genealogy ==
Eshmunazar I was the founder of his namesake dynasty; his heir was his son Tabnit, who fathered Eshmunazar II from his sister Amoashtart.

Eshmunazar I dynasty

Eshmunazar I
Tabnit I	Amoashtart	?
Eshmunazar II	Bodashtart
Yatonmilk

== See also ==
- King of Sidon – List of monarchs of Sidon.

== Sources ==
- Amadasi Guzzo, Maria Giulia (2012). "Sidon et ses sanctuaires" [Sidon and its sanctuaries]. Revue d'Assyriologie et d'archéologie orientale (in French). 106. Presses Universitaires de France: 5–18. doi:10.3917/assy.106.0005. ISSN 0373-6032. JSTOR 42771737.
- Aubet, María Eugenia (2001). The Phoenicians and the West: Politics, Colonies and Trade (2, illustrated, revised ed.). Cambridge: Cambridge University Press. ISBN 9780521795432.
- Boardman, John; Hammond, Nicholas Geoffrey Lemprière; Lewis, David Malcolm; Ostwald, Martin (2000). The Cambridge Ancient History: Persia, Greece and the Western Mediterranean c. 525 to 479 B.C. Vol. 4. Cambridge: Cambridge University Press. ISBN 9780521228046.
- Bromiley, Geoffrey (1979). The International Standard Bible Encyclopedia: Q–Z. Vol. 4. Grand Rapids, Mich.: Wm. B. Eerdmans Publishing. ISBN 9780802837844.
- Bryce, Trevor (2009). The Routledge Handbook of the Peoples and Places of Ancient Western Asia: From the Early Bronze Age to the Fall of the Persian Empire. London: Routledge. ISBN 9780415394857.
- Buhl, Marie Louise (1983). The Near Eastern pottery and objects of other materials from the Upper strata. København: Munksgaard. OCLC 886631942.
- Chéhab, Maurice (1983). "Découvertes phéniciennes au Liban" [Phoenician discoveries in Lebanon]. Atti del I congresso internazionale di studi Fenici e Punici [Proceedings of the first International Congress of Phoenician and Punic studies] (in French).
- Derenbourg, Hartwig (1887). "L'inscription de Tabnit : Père D'Eschmounʿazar" [The inscription of Tabnit: Father of Eshunazar]. Revue de l'histoire des religions (in French). 16: 7–15. ISSN 0035-1423. JSTOR 23659587.
- Dunand, Maurice (1965). "Nouvelles inscriptions phéniciennes du temple d'Echmoun, près Sidon" [New Phoenician inscriptions from the temple of Echmoun, near Sidon]. Bulletin du Musée de Beyrouth (in French). 18. Ministère de la Culture – Direction Générale des Antiquités (Liban): 105–109.
- Elayi, Josette (2018b). Sennacherib, King of Assyria. Atlanta: SBL Press. ISBN 9780884143185.
- Elayi, Josette (2013). Histoire de la Phénicie [The history of Phoenicia] (in French). Paris: Perrin. ISBN 9782262043254.
- Elayi, Josette; Elayi, A. G. (2004). Le monnayage de la cité phénicienne de Sidon à l'époque perse (Ve-IVe s. av. J.-C.): Texte [The coinage of the Phoenician city of Sidon in the Persian era (V-IV s. av. J.-C.): Text] (in French). Paris: Gabalda. ISBN 9782850211584.
- Elayi, Josette (2006). "An updated chronology of the reigns of Phoenician kings during the Persian period (539–333 BCE)" (PDF). Digitorient. Collège de France – UMR7912.
- Greenfield, Jonas C. (1985). "A Group of Phoenician City Seals". Israel Exploration Journal. 35 (2/3). Israel Exploration Society: 129–134. ISSN 0021-2059. JSTOR 27925980.
- Haelewyck, Jean-Claude (2012). "The Phoenician Inscription of Eshmunazar : An Attempt at Vocalization". Bulletin de l'Académie Belge pour l'Étude des Langues Anciennes et Orientales. 1: 77–98. doi:10.14428/BABELAO.VOL1.2012.19803. S2CID 191414877.
- Halpern, Baruch (2016). "Annotations to royal Phoenician inscriptions from Persian Sidon, Zincirli (Kilamuwa), Karatepe (Azitawadda) and Pyrgi". Eretz-Israel: Archaeological, Historical and Geographical Studies. 32. Israel Exploration Society: 18–27. ISSN 0071-108X. JSTOR 26732492.
- Hitti, Philip Khuri (1967). Lebanon in History: From the Earliest Times to the Present. London: Macmillan.
- Jean, Charles François (1947). "L'étude du milieu biblique" [The study of the biblical environment]. Nouvelle Revue Théologique (in French): 245–270.
- Jidejian, Nina (1971). Sidon through the ages. Beirut: Dar el-Machreq.
- Kaoukabani, Ibrahim (2005). "Les estampilles phénicienne de Tyr" [The Phoenician stamps of Tyre] (PDF). Archaeology & History in the Lebanon (in French) (21). AHL: 3–79. Archived from the original (PDF) on 22 July 2023 – via Archaeology & History in Lebanon.
- Netanyahu, Benzion (1964). The World History of the Jewish People. Tel Aviv: Jewish History Publications Limited. ISBN 9780813506159.
- Nitschke, Jessica (2007). Perceptions of Culture: Interpreting Greco-Near Eastern Hybridity in the Phoenician Homeland (PhD thesis). Berkeley: University of California.
- Versluys, Miguel John (2010). "Understanding Egypt In Egypt And Beyond". In Bricault, Laurent (ed.). Isis on the Nile. Egyptian Gods in Hellenistic and Roman Egypt - Proceedings of the IVth International Conference of Isis Studies, Liège, November 27–29, 2008 : Michel Malaise in honorem. Religions in the Graeco-Roman world, 171. Leiden: Brill. pp. 7–36. doi:10.1163/EJ.9789004188822.I-364.10. ISBN 9789004210868. S2CID 56027286.
- Xella, Paolo; López, José-Ángel Zamora (2005b). "Nouveaux documents phéniciens du sanctuaire d'Eshmoun à Bustan esh-Sheikh (Sidon)" [New Phoenician documents from the sanctuary of Eshmun in Bustan esh-Sheikh (Sidon)]. In Arruda, A. M. (ed.). Atti del VI congresso internazionale di studi Fenici e Punici [Proceedings of the 6th International Congress of Phoenician and Punic studies] (in French). Lisbon.
- Yates, Kyle Monroe (1942). Preaching from the Prophets. New York: Harper & brothers. ISBN 9780805415025.
- Zamora, José-Ángel (2016). "Autres rois, autre temple: la dynastie d'Eshmounazor et le sanctuaire extra-urbain de Eshmoun à Sidon" [Other kings, other temple: the dynasty of Eshmunazor and the extra-urban sanctuary of Eshmun in Sidon]. In Russo Tagliente, Alfonsina; Guarneri, Francesca (eds.). Santuari mediterranei tra Oriente e Occidente : interazioni e contatti culturali : atti del Convegno internazionale, Civitavecchia – Roma 2014 [Mediterranean sanctuaries between East and West: interactions and cultural contacts: Proceedings of the International Conference, Civitavecchia–Rome 2014] (in French). Rome: Scienze e lettere. pp. 253–262. ISBN 9788866870975.

Eshmunazar I Eshmunazar I Dynasty
Unknown	King of Sidon c. 575–550 BC	Succeeded by Tabnit I
