= Amoashtart =

6th-century BC Queen of Sidon

- Queen-consort of Sidon, co-regent with her son Eshmunazar II
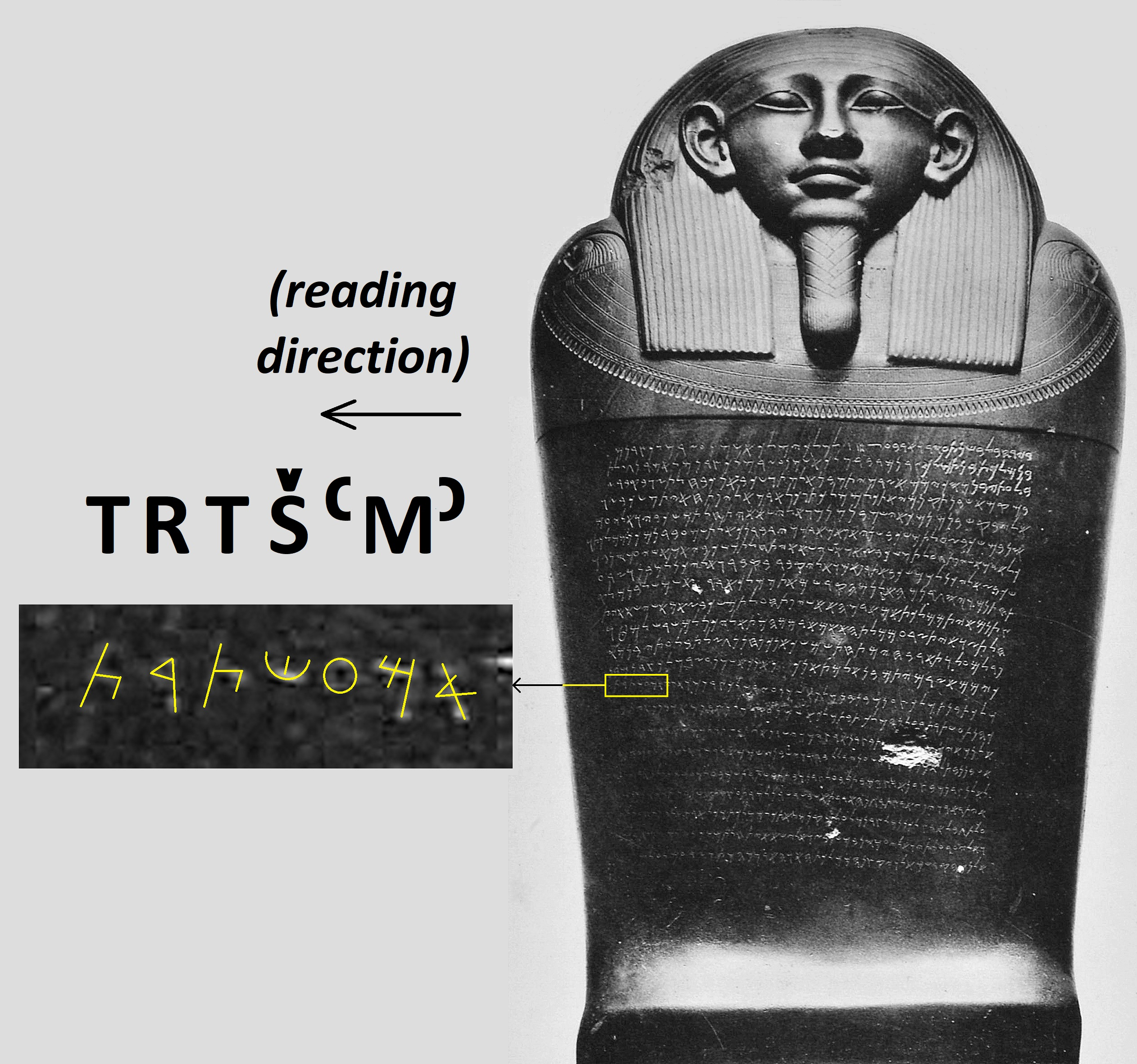
- The name Amoashtart (’M‘ŠTRT) on the sarcophagus of her son Eshmunazar II.

Queen of Sidon
- Reign: c. 539 BC – c. 525 BC
- Predecessor: Tabnit I (spouse and brother)
- Successor: Bodashtart
- Spouse: Tabnit I
- Issue: Eshmunazar II
- Phoenician language: 𐤀𐤌𐤏𐤔𐤕𐤓𐤕
- Dynasty: Eshmunazar I dynasty
- Father: Eshmunazar I
- Religion: Canaanite polytheism

Amoashtart (Phoenician: 𐤀𐤌𐤏𐤔𐤕𐤓𐤕 *ʾAmīʿaštārt, "my mother is Astarte") was a Phoenician queen of Sidon during the Persian period. She was the daughter of Eshmunazar I, and the wife of her brother, Tabnit. When Tabnit died, Amoashtart became co-regent to her then-infant son, Eshmunazar II, but after the boy died "in his fourteenth year", she was succeeded by her nephew Bodashtart, possibly in a palace coup. Modern historians have characterized her as an "energetic, responsible [woman], and endowed with immense political acumen, [who] exercised royal functions for many years".

The only source for her biography is the sarcophagus of her son.

== Etymology ==
Amoashtart is the Romanized form of the Phoenician theophoric name 𐤀𐤌𐤏𐤔𐤕𐤓𐤕 meaning "my mother is Astarte". Variable spellings include: Em-Astarte, Amo-Astarte, ’Am‘aštart, and Immi-Ashtart.

== Biography ==
Amoashtart became queen ca. 550 BCE, as the wife of king Tabnit. This was a period when the economy of Sidon thrived, possibly after the competing city of Tyre had been hit severely by an earthquake (c. 550). Sidon was "reborn as an independent kingdom" and became "the leading Phoenician polity". The economic boom made possible an extensive building program of new city districts and grandiose temples for Ashtart, Baal, and Eshmun, as is testified in the inscriptions of both Eshmunazar II and Bodashtart. Because of the age of her boy son, these activities will in practice have been the initiative of the mother. A sign of the preeminent role of Sidon in Phoenicia is that the Persian kings (the "Lord of Kings") endowed Sidon with the rule over the two southern Palestinian cities of Dor and Jaffa, and the "land of Dagon".

According to the sarcophagus of Eshmunazar II, Amoashtart was also a high priestess of Astarte. This traditionally was the main task of Sidonian kings. An Amoashtart sarcophagus has never been found. It is thought that one of the nameless sarcophagi in the royal tomb of Sidon may be hers. However, a uninscribed 26th dynasty Egyptian sarcophagus, along with the Sarcophagus of her husband Tabnit and her son Eshmunazar II were located at the nearby Royal Necropolis of Ayaʿa in the late 19th century. (Note: According to Thomas Kelly, Professor Emeritus of History at the University of Minnesota: "Of prime importance [for the dating of 'Es-mun'azor II] is the sarcophagus in which Esmun’azor was buried; it is clearly of Egyptian manufacture and must have been transported to Sidon from Egypt. Moreover, 'Esmun'azor's father Tabnit and a woman frequently assumed to be his wife Am'astart, mother of 'Esmun'azor Il, were also buried in Egyptian sarcophagi that must have been brought to Sidon. (The woman's identity, however, is not certain.) All three sarcophagi have been assigned to the 26th dynasty, which came to an end with the Persian conquest of Egypt. While the sarcophagus of Tabnit was the only one that was completely worked in Egypt before being transported to Sidon, all three are stylistically similar and Buhl has suggested that they were products of the same workshop. It is universally assumed that they must have come to Sidon as booty from a military campaign in Egypt. That assumption seems reasonable enough, for they are, so far as I am aware, the only Egyptian sarcophagi that have ever been found outside Egypt proper. Moreover, these Egyptian sarcophagi seem to have been models for the manufacture of anthropoid sarcophagi at Sidon. Numerous examples, worked in marble and dating mostly from the latter half of the fifth and early half of the fourth centuries B.C., have been found in the city. Though inspired by Egyptian models, these locally manufactured sarcophagi are also under heavy Greek influence. This is important, for their stylistic similarity to products of Greek sculpture allows them to be dated within reasonable limits, though not with absolute certainty. Kukahn dates the earliest of these Sidon sarcophagi to the second quarter of the fifth century B.C.; Kleemann would date them about 475 B.C., while Buhl assigns them to the decade 470–460 B.C. The three Egyptian sarcophagi of Esmun’azor II, Tabnit, and the unidentified woman must, accordingly, have been brought to Sidon earlier.") Marie-Louise Buhl's monograph The late Egyptian anthropoid stone sarcophagi confirmed the sarcophagus as belonging to them, which began in 664 BC and ended with Cambyses II's conquest of Egypt in 525 BC – many centuries after the last of the known Egyptian Stelae in the Levant. As these three Egyptian sarcophagi were buried together, it's are considered to have contained the bodies of the same family – i.e. Eshmunazar II and his parents Tabnit and Amoashtart. The uninscribed sarcophagus that presumed to be Amoashtart's currently resides at the Istanbul Archaeology Museums along with Tabnit's sarcophagus.

== Egyptian influences ==
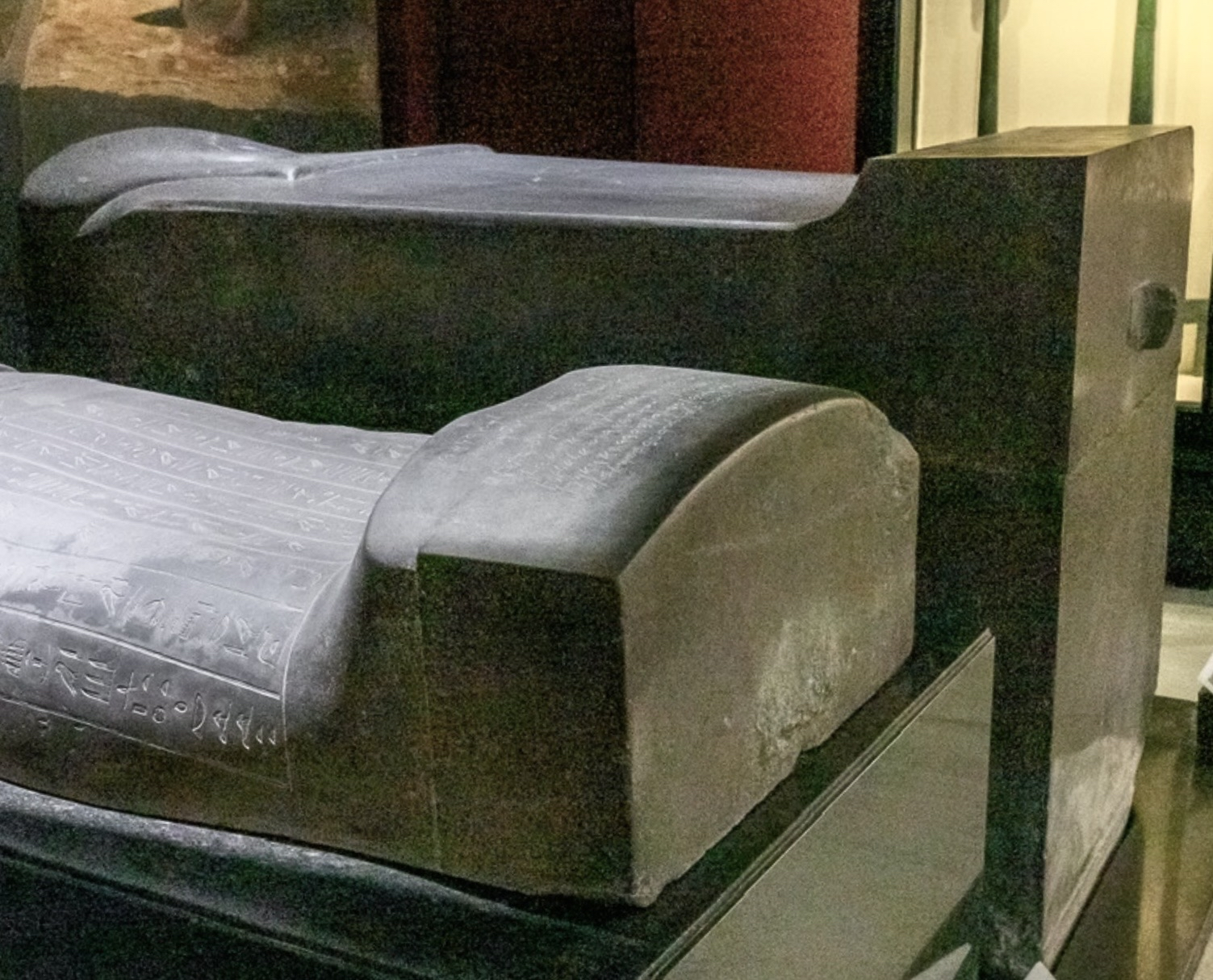
A uninscribed Sarcophagus that is presumed to belong to Amoashtart, lying next to the Tabnit sarcophagus in the Istanbul Archaeology Museums.

Amoashtart was married to her own brother, Tabnit. This was common practice among the Egyptian pharaohs, and it may be a sign of strong Egyptian cultural influence in Phoenicia at the time. Since the ninth century Phoenicia had nominally been part of at first the Assyrian, then the Babylonian, and then the Achaemenid empires, but in the early sixth century, between ca. 610 and c. 570, Egypt had repeatedly invaded Phoenicia, and economic contacts between Egypt and Phoenicia traditionally were strong. Admiration for Egyptian culture is also visible from the use of Egyptian or Egyptian style sarcophagi by the Sidonian rulers Tabnit and Eshmunazar II.

== Genealogy ==
Amoashtart is the daughter of Eshmunazar I, the founder of his namesake dynasty.

Eshmunazar I dynasty

Eshmunazar I
Tabnit I	Amoashtart	?
Eshmunazar II	Bodashtart
Yatonmilk
