= Eshmunazar =

Eshmunazar may refer to:

- Eshmunazar I
- Eshmunazar II
