= Tabnit =

6th-century BC Phoenician king of Sidon

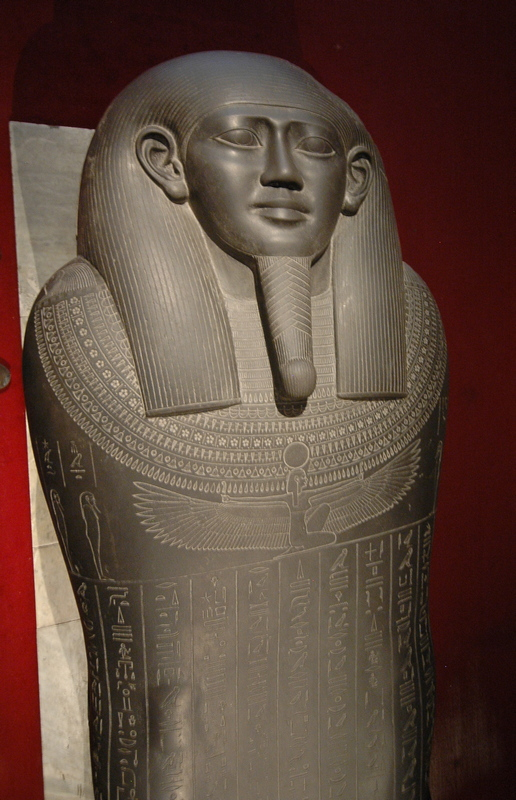
- The Tabnit sarcophagus, Istanbul Archaeology Museum.
- Spouse: Amoashtart (also his sister)
- Children: Eshmunazar II
- Relatives: Amoashtart (sister) unnamed brother Bodashtart (nephew); Yatonmilk (grandnephew)
- Military career
- Allegiance: Achaemenid Empire
- Service years: c. 549 BC – c. 539 BC
- Rank: King of Sidon

The capital of Tabnit was Sidon.

Tabnit (Phoenician: 𐤕𐤁𐤍𐤕 TBNT) was the Phoenician King of Sidon c. 549–539 BC. He was the father of King Eshmunazar II.

He is well known from his sarcophagus, decorated with two separate and unrelated inscriptions – one in Egyptian hieroglyphics and one in Phoenician script. It was created in the 6th century BC, and was unearthed in 1887 by Osman Hamdi Bey at the Ayaa Necropolis near Sidon together with the Alexander Sarcophagus and other related sarcophagi. Tabnit's body was found floating in the original embalming fluid and almost perfectly preserved, save for the face and neck which were not submerged, but Bey's men spilled all the fluid and left the body to rot in the desert sun, at which point it quickly decomposed to little more than bones and withered viscera. Both the sarcophagus and Tabnit's decomposed skeleton are now in the Istanbul Archaeology Museums.

The sarcophagus, together with the Sarcophagus of Eshmunazar II, was possibly acquired by the Sidonians following their participation in the Battle of Pelusium (525 BC), and served as models for later Phoenician sarcophagi.

== Dating ==
Both the Tabnit sarcophagus and the Sarcophagus of Eshmunazar II are thought to originally date from the Twenty-sixth Dynasty of Egypt, which had its capital at Sais. This is partially due to their resemblance to similar sarcophagi such as the Psamtik II-era Horkhebit sarcophagus from Saqqara, now in the Metropolitan Museum of Art.

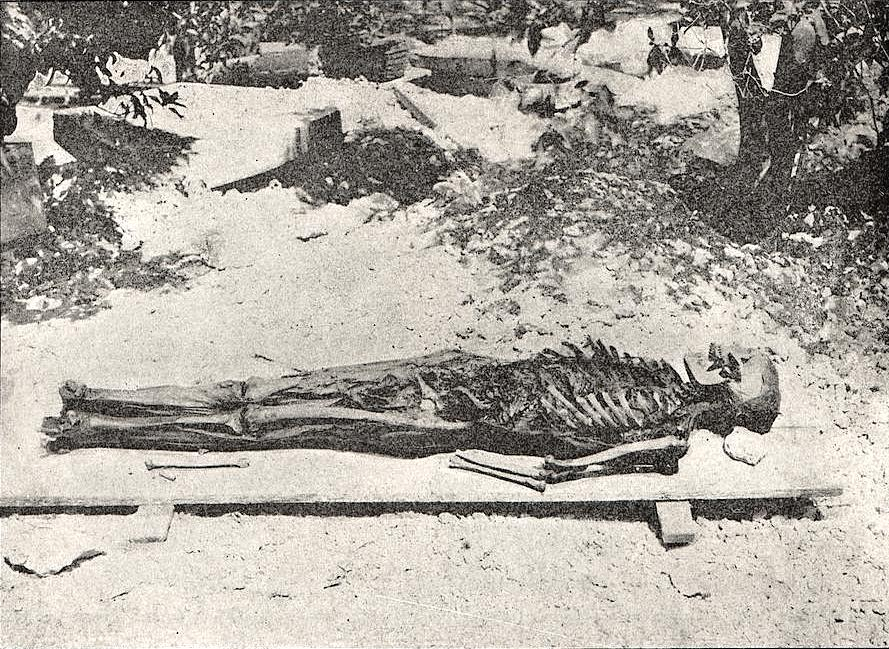
Skeleton of king Tabnit

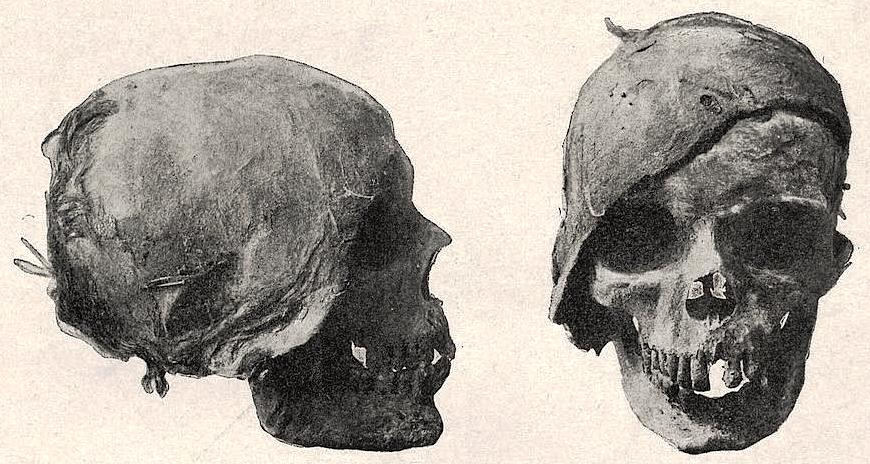
Head of king Tabnit

== Notes ==
Tabnit Eshmunazar I Dynasty
Preceded by Eshmunazar I	King of Sidon c. 549–539 BC	Succeeded by Eshmunazar II
