= Maria Giulia Amadasi Guzzo =

Italian scholar

Maria Giulia Amadasi Guzzo (7 August 1940 – 30 August 2024) was a leading scholar in Semitic epigraphy. She was Professor of Semitic Epigraphy at the Department of Sciences of Antiquity of the Sapienza University of Rome, and the director of the "Museum of the Near East" of the University La Sapienza. She was a corresponding member of the German Archaeological Institute.

Amadasi participated as an epigrapher in the archaeological missions of the University of Rome in Mozia, Monte Sirai, Tas Silg (Malta); of the Missions, most recently, of the Universities of Naples and Florence and Bologna in Tell Barri and Tell Afis (Syria). Amadasi also carried out epigraphic missions with the University of Rome and CNR) in Cyprus and Tripolitania in Libya.

Amadasi published the Phoenician inscriptions of the sanctuary of Astarte in Malta and the Phoenician archives of the city of Idalion in Cyprus. She is the author of an extensive bibliography on the history of writing, grammar and Semitic epigraphy.

She died in Rome on August 30, 2024.

== Selected works ==
- Vida, Giorgio Levi Della; Caputo, Giacomo; Amadasi, Maria Giulia; Guzzo, Maria Giulia Amadasi (1987). Iscrizioni puniche della Tripolitania (1927-1967) (in Italian). L'ERMA di BRETSCHNEIDER. ISBN 978-88-7062-612-4.
- Guzzo, Maria Giulia Amadasi; Schneider, Eugenia Equini (1997). Pétra (in French). Arthaud. ISBN 978-2-7003-1165-5.
- Friedrich, Johannes; Röllig, Wolfgang; Guzzo, Maria Giulia Amadasi; Amadasi, Maria Giulia; Mayer, Werner R. (1999). Phönizisch-Punische Grammatik (in German). Gregorian Biblical BookShop. ISBN 978-88-7653-259-7.
- Guzzo, Maria Giulia Amadasi; Amadasi, Maria Giulia (1990). Iscrizioni fenicie e puniche in Italia (in Italian). Libreria dello Stato, Istituto poligrafico e Zecca dello Stato. ISBN 978-88-240-0109-0.
- Amadasi Guzzo, Maria Giulia (2007). Carthage (in French). Presses universitaires de France. ISBN 978-2-13-053962-9.
- Guzzo, Maria Giulia Amadasi (2011). Il Sanctuario di astarte di malta: le iscrizioni in fenicio da Tas-Silġ (in French). Sapienza Università di Roma.
- Guzzo, Maria Giulia Amadasi (2016). Kartaca (in Turkish). Dost Kitabevi. ISBN 978-975-298-545-2.
