= José Ángel Zamora López =

Spanish antiquity historian

- Occupation: Antiquity historian
- Known for: Phoenician studies

José Ángel Zamora López is a Spanish antiquity historian, and a Phoenician and ancient Levant specialist. His area of expertise includes the study of the history and culture of the Levant, and of its Phoenician Mediterranean dependencies during the Bronze and Iron Ages.

== Education ==
Zamora López graduated in Geography and History from the University of Zaragoza in 1994 where he specialized in Antiquity Sciences. In 1996, he obtained a degree in Ancient History, and a doctorate in Philosophy and Letters from the University of Zaragoza.

Zamora López undertook further studies between 1994 and 2002 in ancient language, cultures, and history of the Ancient Near East at the Institute of Philology of Madrid, the Sapienza University of Rome, and at the Pontifical Biblical Institute of Rome.

== Career ==
Between 1995 and 1999, Zamora López served as a pre-doctoral fellow, and as a postdoctoral fellow between 1999 and 2002 in various research institutions, including the Spanish Ministry of Science and Technology, the Madrid Student Residence, the Europa CAI Program, and the Spanish Academy in Rome. During this period, he also carried out research internships in Germany, Syria, Great Britain, France, and Lebanon, in addition to three years of postdoctoral research in Italy, at the Istituto per la Civiltà Fenicia e Punica of Rome.

He was an I3P contracted researcher (2003-2004) and a Ramón y Cajal contracted researcher, between 2004 and 2007.

Zamora López is Deputy Director of the Corpus Inscriptionum Phoenicarum necnon Poenicarum Project and of the Dizionario Enciclopedico della Civiltà Fenicia. He serves as an epigraphist for several national archaeological sites such as the Castillo de Doña Blanca in Cádiz, and Idalion in Cyprus. He is a member of several institutions, associations, and international scientific groups such as the Italian Gruppo di contatto per lo studio delle religioni mediterranee and is part of the steering committee of various scientific publications. He is the Scientific Secretary of the journal Studi Epigrafici e Linguistici sul Vicino Oriente Antico since 2012.

Zamora López is a Senior Scientist at the Spanish Center of Human and Social Studies (CSIC) since 2008.

== Awards and distinctions ==
Zamora López was awarded the I3P "Outstanding Research Career" certification from the Institute of Islamic and Near Eastern Studies of Zaragoza.
