= Awali (river) =

River in Lebanon

Coordinates: 33.5888°N 35.3860°E

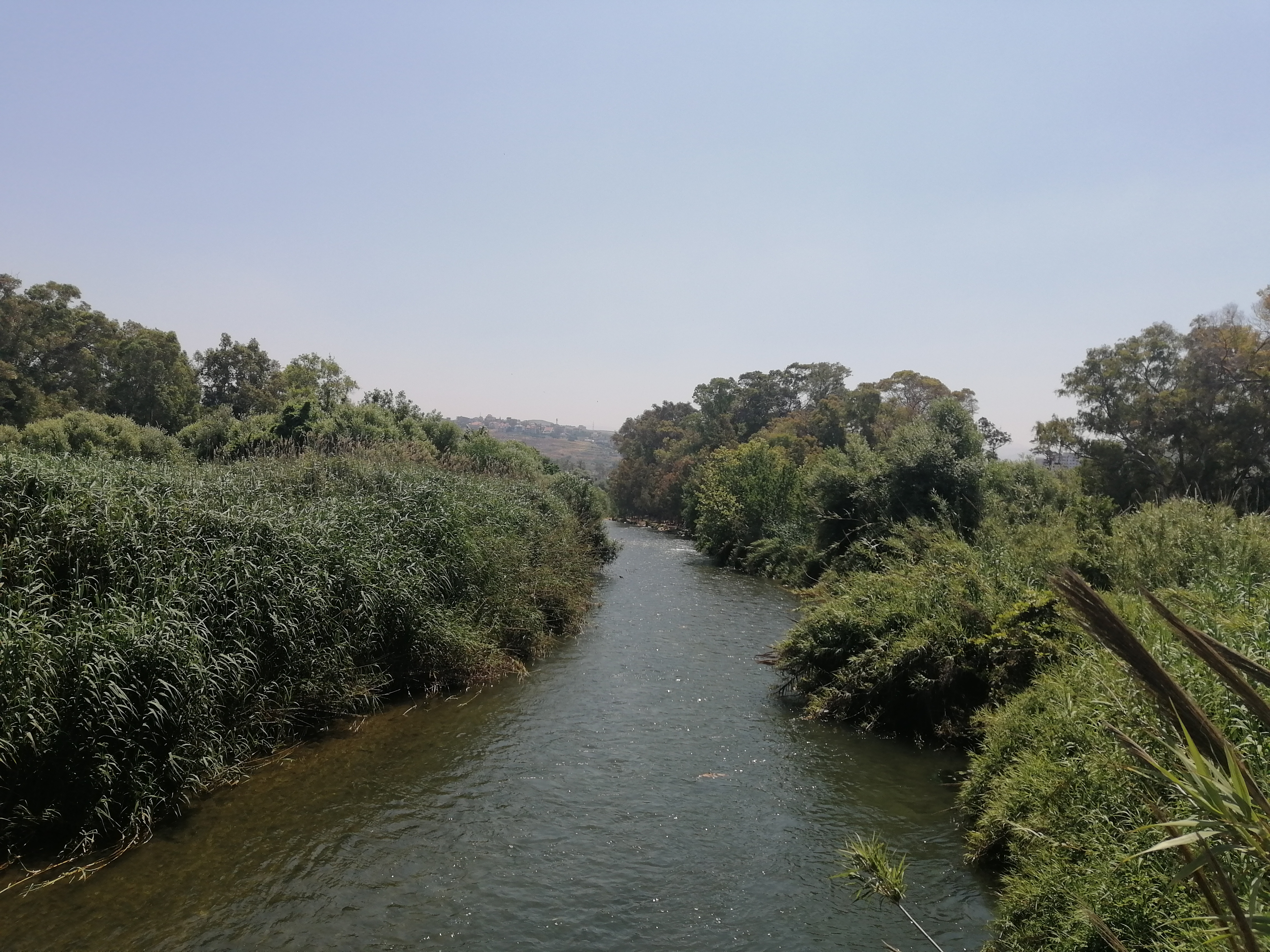
- Awali river

Location
- Country: Lebanon

Physical characteristics
- Source
  - location: Barouk and Niha mountains, Lebanon
- Mouth
  - location: the Mediterranean
- Length: 48 km (30 mi)
- Basin size: 294 km^{2} (114 sq mi)
- Discharge
  - average: 10.1625 m^{3}/s (358.89 cu ft/s)

The Awali (Arabic: نهر الأولي / ALA-LC: Nahr al-Awalī, ancient Bostrenus / Bostrenos) is a perennial river flowing in Central and Southern Lebanon. In ancient times, it was known as the Asclepius River. The Awali, which is 48 kilometres (30 mi) long, originates from the Barouk mountain at an elevation of 1,492 metres (4,895 ft) and from the Niha mountain. Two tributaries, the Aaray and Barouk rivers, supplement the Awali. The river is also called the Bisri river in its upper section. It flows along the western face of Mount Lebanon and empties into the Mediterranean. The Awali has a discharge rate of approximately 10.2 m^{3}/s (360 cu ft/s) and drains a watershed covering about 294 km^{2} (114 sq mi).
