= Eshmun =

Deity of Phoenician mythology

- God of healing
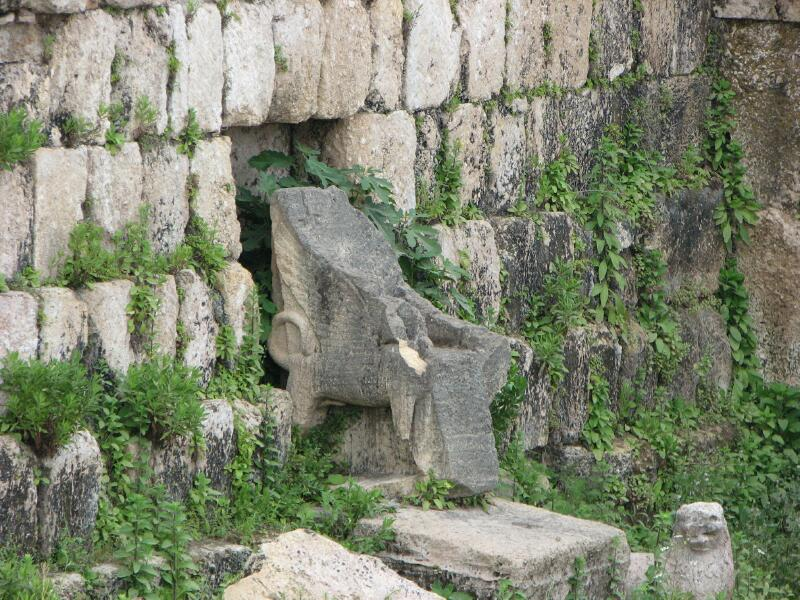
- Ruins of the 7th century BC Phoenician Temple of Eshmun in Sidon
- Phoencian: 𐤀𐤔𐤌𐤍
- Major cult center: Sidon, Beirut, Cyprus, Sardinia, and Carthage
- Symbol: Serpent
- Gender: Male
- Temples: Temple of Eshmun at Bostan el-Sheikh, Sidon

Equivalents
- Greek: Asclepius
- Roman: Aesculapius

Eshmun (or Eshmoun, less accurately Esmun or Esmoun; Phoenician: 𐤀𐤔𐤌𐤍, romanized: ʾešmūn; Akkadian: 𒅀𒋢𒈬𒉡 Yasumunu) was a Phoenician god of healing and the tutelary deity of Sidon. His name, which means 'eighth', may reference his status as the eighth son of the god Sydyk. He was identified with Asclepius.

== History ==
Eshmun was known at least from the Iron Age era of Sidon and the Temple of Eshmun there. He was also worshipped in Tyre, Beirut, Cyprus, and Sardinia, as well as in Carthage, where the site of his temple is now occupied by the acropolium of Carthage, which was until recently a Catholic Church built in 1884.

According to Eusebius, the Phoenician author Sanchuniathon wrote that Sydyk ('Righteousness', parallel to Hebrew tzadik; in the interpretatio romana, he was identified with Jupiter) first fathered seven sons (equated with the Cabeiri or the Dioscuri), no mother named, and then afterwards fathered an eighth son by one of the seven Titans (possibly meaning the Kotharat). The name Eshmun appears to mean 'the Eighth'.

The 6th-century Neoplatonist Damascius stated, "The Asclepius in Beirut is neither a Greek nor an Egyptian, but some native Phoenician divinity. For to Sadyk were born children who are interpreted as Dioscuri and Cabeiri; and in addition to these was born an eighth son, Esmunus, who is interpreted as Asclepius."

Photius (Bibliotheca Codex 242) summarizes Damascius as saying further that Asclepius of Beirut was a youth who was fond of hunting. He was seen by the goddess Astronoë (thought by many scholars to be a version of Astarte) who so harassed him with amorous pursuit that in desperation he castrated himself and died. Astronoë then named the youth Paeon 'Healer', restored him to life from the warmth of her body, and changed him into a god.

A trilingual inscription of the 2nd century BCE from Sardinia also identifies Eshmun with the Greek Asclepius and the Latin Aesculapius. Pausanias quotes a Sidonian as saying that the Phoenicians claim Apollo as the father of Asclepius, as do the Greeks, but unlike them do not make his mother a mortal woman. The Sidonian then continued with an allegory which explained that Apollo represented the sun, whose changing path imparts to the air its healthiness which is to be understood as Asclepius. This allegory seems likely a late invention. Also, Apollo is usually equated with the Phoenician plague god Resheph. This might be a variant version of Eshmun's parentage, or Apollo might also be equated with Sadyk, and Sadyk might be equated with Resheph.

In Cyprus, Eshmun was syncretized with Melqart, and also in Ibiza, as given by a dedication reciting: "to his lord, Eshmun-Melqart".

The name Astresmunim ('herb of Eshmun') was applied by Dioscorides to the solanum, which was regarded as having medicinal qualities.

== Worship ==
The Temple of Eshmun is found 1 km from Sidon on the Bostrenus (now called the Awali in southwestern Lebanon). Building was begun at the end of the sixth century BCE during the reign of Eshmunazar II, King of Sidon, and later additions were made up into the Roman period. It was excavated by Maurice Dunand in 1963–1978. Many votive offerings were found in the form of statues of persons healed by the god, especially babies and young children.

Also found near the temple was a gold plaque of Eshmun and the goddess Hygieia (meaning "Health") showing Eshmun holding a staff in his right hand around which a serpent is entwined. A coin of the 3rd century CE from Beirut shows Eshmun standing between two serpents.

== Place names ==
A village near Beirut named Qabr Shmoun, "Eshmoun's grave," still exists.

== See also ==
- Delos

== Bibliography ==
- Greenfield, Jonas Carl (1995), Solving Riddles and Untying Knots: Biblical, Epigraphic, and Semitic Studies in Honor of Jonas C. Greenfield, Eisenbrauns, ISBN 978-0-931464-93-5.
- Ogden, Daniel (2021), The Oxford Handbook of Heracles, Oxford University Press, ISBN 9780190650988.
- Sauer, A. (2018), The Archaeology of Jordan and Beyond: Essays in Memory of James A. Sauer, Brill, ISBN 9789004369801.
- Cassel, Paulus (1872). Esmun. Eine archäologische Untersuchung aus der Geschichte Kenaans ... Mit einem einleitenden Sendschreiben über Studien des Alten Testaments [Esmun. An archaeological study from the history of Kenaan ... With an introductory missive on Old Testament studies.] (in German). Gotha: Gustav Schlössmann.'
- Court de Gébelin, Antoine (1773). Allégories orientales, ou, le fragment de Sanchoniaton, qui contient l'histoire de saturne: suivie de celles de mercure et d'hercule, et de ses douze travaux ... [Oriental allegories, or, the fragment of Sanchoniaton, which contains the story of Saturn: followed by those of Mercury and Hercules, and his twelve labors.] (in French). Paris: chez l'auteur.
- Lipiński, Edward (1995). Dieux et Déesses de l'Univers Phénicien et Punique [Gods and Goddesses of the Phoenician and Punic Universe] (in French). Leuven: Peeters Publishers. pp. 154–168. ISBN 978-90-6831-690-2. OCLC 33211400.
