= Astarte =

Middle Eastern goddess, worshipped from the Bronze Age through classical antiquity

- Goddess of Beauty, Love, War and Hunting
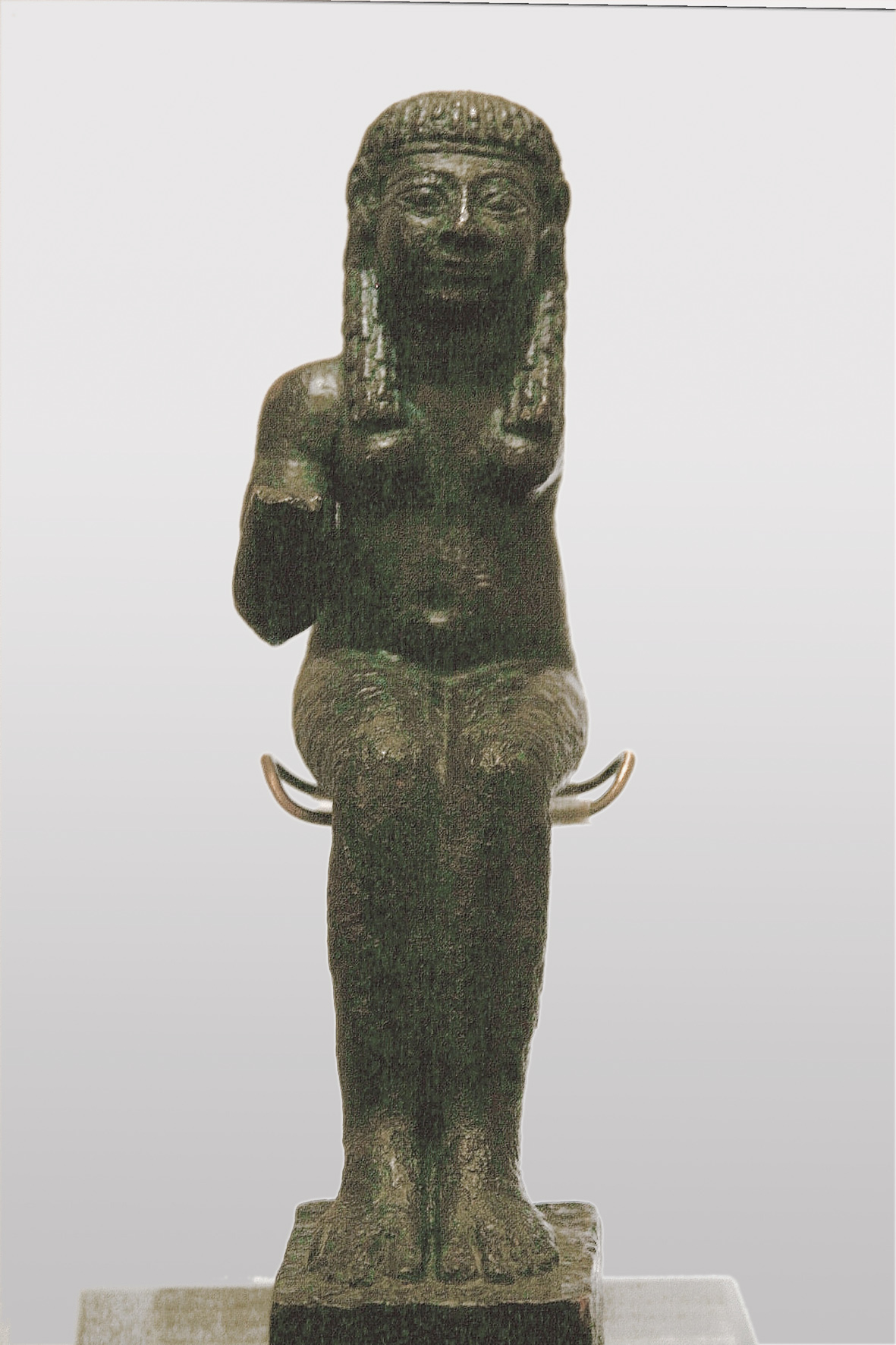
- Phoenician statuette figurine of ʿAštart from El Carambolo in Spain
- Major cult center: Ugarit, Emar, Sidon, Tyre
- Planet: possibly Venus
- Symbols: lion, chariot
- Parents: Epigeius/Ouranos and Ge/Gaea (Hellenised Phoenician tradition); Ptah or Ra (in Egyptian tradition)
- Consort: possibly Baal (Hadad)

Equivalents
- Greek: Aphrodite; possibly Hera (indirect roots)
- Roman: Venus; possibly Juno (indirect roots, particularly because of Tanit connection)
- Mesopotamian: Ishtar
- Sumerian: Inanna
- Hurrian: Ishara; Shaushka
- Egyptian: Isis

Astarte (/əˈstɑːrtiː/; Ancient Greek: Ἀστάρτη, romanized: Astártē) is the Hellenized form of the Ancient Near Eastern goddess ʿAṯtart. ʿAṯtart was the Northwest Semitic equivalent of the East Semitic goddess Ishtar.

Astarte was worshipped from the Bronze Age through classical antiquity, and her name is particularly associated with her worship in the ancient Levant among the Canaanites and Phoenicians, though she was originally associated with Amorite cities like Ugarit and Emar, as well as Mari and Ebla. She was also celebrated in Egypt, especially during the reign of the Ramessides, following the importation of foreign cults there. Phoenicians introduced her cult in their colonies on the Iberian Peninsula.

== Name ==
The Proto-Semitic form of this goddess's name was ʿAṯtart. While earlier scholarship suggested that the name ʿAṯtart was formed by adding the Afroasiatic feminine suffix -t to the name of the deity ʿAṯtar, more recent views accept the names ʿAṯtar and ʿAṯtart as being etymologically related while considering the exact relationship between them to be unclear. The meaning of the names ʿAṯtar and ʿAṯtart are themselves still unclear.

The Masoretic Text vocalization ʿAštōret is in dispute: most scholars consider it as an artificial superimposition of the vowels of the Hebrew word bōšet (בֹּ֫שֶׁת, 'shame') upon the consonants of the original name; some other suggest it is a result of the Canaanite shift from /ā/ to /ō/ (despite the unexpected occurrence of the shift in this position), or, with an assumption of an early form *ʿAštārit, as a conventional occurrence of the shift -ā(r)i- to -ō(r)ē-.

== Overview ==
In various cultures, Astarte was connected with some combination of the following spheres: war, sexuality, royal power, beauty, healing and — especially in Ugarit and Emar — hunting; however, known sources do not indicate she was a fertility goddess, contrary to opinions in early scholarship. Her symbol was the lion and she was also often associated with the horse and by extension chariots. The dove might be a symbol of her as well, as evidenced by some Bronze Age cylinder seals. The only images identified with absolute certainty as Astarte are these depicting her as a combatant on horseback or in a chariot. While many authors in the past asserted that she has been known as the deified morning and evening star, it has been questioned if she had an astral character at all, at least in Ugarit and Emar. God lists known from Ugarit and other prominent Bronze Age Syrian cities regarded her as the counterpart of Assyro-Babylonian goddess Ištar, and of the Hurrian Ishtar-like goddesses Ishara (presumably in her aspect of "lady of love") and Shaushka; in some cities, the western forms of the name and the eastern form "Ishtar" were fully interchangeable.

In later times Astarte was worshipped in Syria and Canaan. Her worship spread to Cyprus, where she may have been merged with an ancient Cypriot goddess. This merged Cypriot goddess may have been adopted into the Greek pantheon in Mycenaean and Dark Age times to form Aphrodite. An outdated argument, however, postulates that Astarte's character was less erotic and more warlike than Ishtar originally was, perhaps because she was influenced by the Canaanite goddess Anat, and that therefore Ishtar, not Astarte, was the direct forerunner of the Cypriot goddess. However, evidence from Iron Age Phoenicia show that Astarte became a more erotic goddess as opposed to her early Bronze Age worship in Ugarit and Syria, and that early attestations of Aphrodite, were more war-like.

Greeks in classical, Hellenistic, and Roman times occasionally equated Aphrodite with Astarte and many other Near Eastern goddesses, in keeping with their frequent practice of syncretizing other deities with their own. In addition, certain aspects of other Greek gods, such as Artemis Astrateia are hypothesized to be heavily influenced by Astarte.

Major centers of Astarte's worship in the Iron Age were the Phoenician city-states of Sidon, Tyre, and Byblos. Coins from Sidon portray a chariot in which a globe appears, presumably a stone representing Astarte. "She was often depicted on Sidonian coins as standing on the prow of a galley, leaning forward with right hand outstretched, being thus the original of all figureheads for sailing ships." In Sidon, she shared a temple with Eshmun. Coins from Beirut show Poseidon, Astarte, and Eshmun worshipped together.

Other significant locations where she was introduced by Phoenician sailors and colonists were Cythera, Malta, and Eryx in Sicily from which she became known to the Romans as Venus Erycina. Three inscriptions from the Pyrgi Tablets dating to about 500 BC found near Caere in Etruria mentions the construction of a shrine to Astarte in the temple of the local goddess Uni-Astre (𐌔𐌄𐌓𐌕𐌔𐌀𐌋𐌀𐌉𐌍𐌖). At Carthage Astarte was worshipped alongside the goddess Tanit, and frequently appeared as a theophoric element in personal names.

== Iconography ==
Iconographic portrayal of Astarte, very similar to that of Tanit, often depicts her naked and in presence of lions, identified respectively with symbols of sexuality and war. She is also depicted as winged, carrying the solar disk and the crescent moon as a headdress, and with her lions either lying prostrate to her feet or directly under those. Aside from the lion, Astarte is associated with the dove and the bee. She has also been associated with botanic wildlife like the palm tree and the lotus flower.

A particular artistic motif assimilates Astarte to Europa, portraying her as riding a bull that would represent a partner deity. Similarly, after the popularization of her worship in Egypt, it was frequent to associate her with the war chariot of Ra or Horus, as well as a kind of weapon, the crescent axe. Within Iberian culture, it has been proposed that native sculptures like those of Baza, Elche or Cerro de los Santos might represent an Iberized image of Astarte or Tanit.

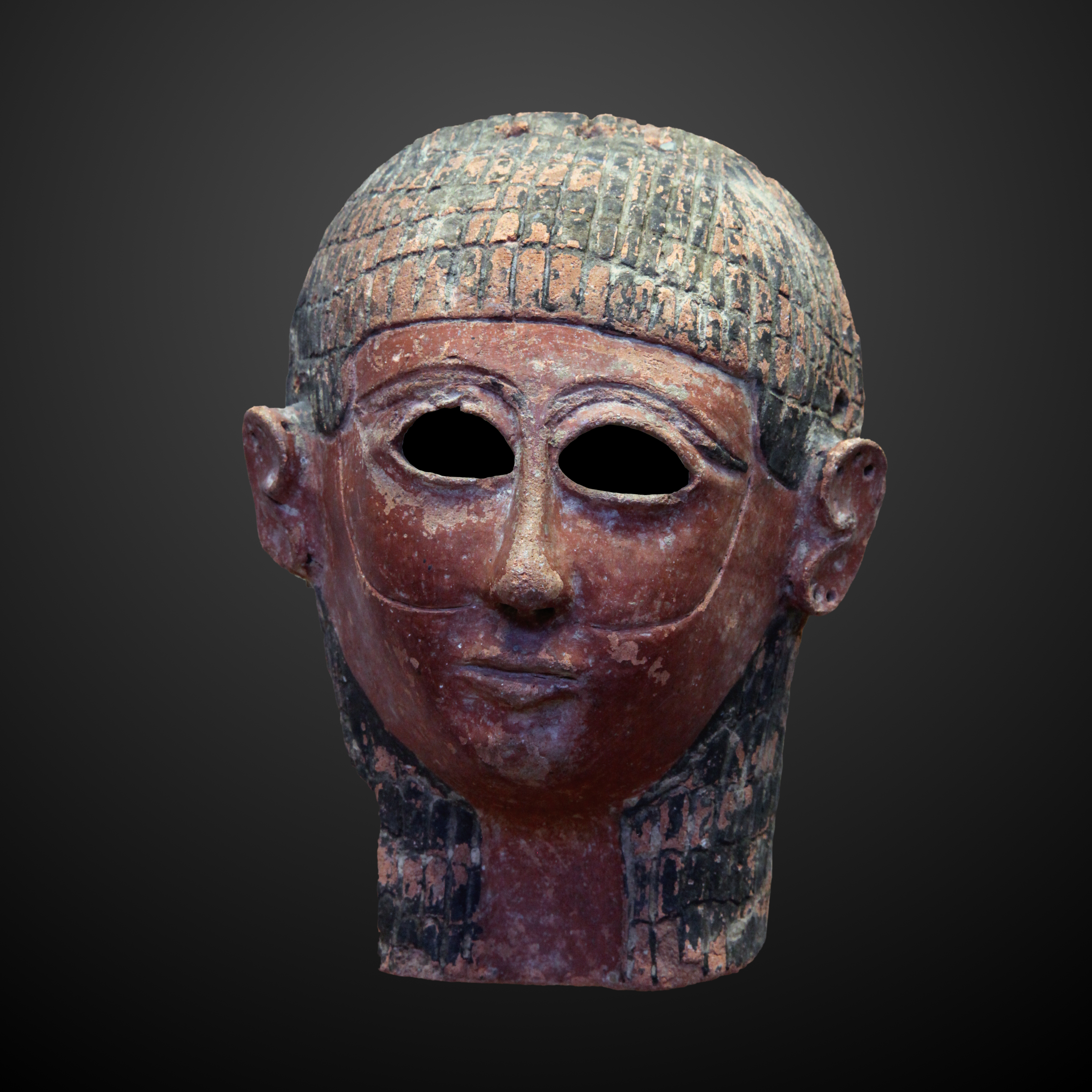
A mask from 4th century BC Carthage of an androgynous, bearded individual, has been argued to be Astarte

Some androgynous figurines from Luristan having both female breasts and a beard have been argued to be portrayals of Astarte. Multiple Judean pillar figures feature a feminine form with breasts and a beard, holding a solar disk, and are thought to be Astarte.

== Attestations ==
=== At Ebla ===
The earliest record of ʿAṯtart is from Ebla in the 3rd millennium BC, where her name is attested in the forms Aštarta (𒀾𒁯𒋫) and Ištarta (𒅖𒁯𒋫).

=== In early Mari ===
The main cult centre of ʿAṯtart was Mari, where early texts from her temple pre-dating the city's destruction by the Akkadian Empire record her name as ᴰʿAṯtarat (𒀭𒀸𒁯𒊏𒀜), who appears to have been distinguished from ʿAṯtart's East Semitic equivalent, the Mesopotamian goddess Ištar, at Mari.

One text from Mari records that offerings were made to both ʿAṯtarat and the river-god Nārum together.

=== Among Amorites ===
==== In Amorite Mari ====
The main cult centre of ʿAṯtart was still the city of Mari during the Amorite period, when her name is attested as a theophoric element in personal names such as ᴰAštart-azi (𒀭𒀸𒁯𒋫𒍣, lit. 'ʿAṯtart is my strength'). However, her name was otherwise written in cuneiform using ideograms and without the feminine suffix -t, in the forms ᴰaš-dar (𒀭𒀸𒁯) and ᴰinanna (𒀭𒈹).

A contemporary incantation against snakebites from Ugarit recorded the existence of a manifestation of ʿAṯtart who resided in Mari.

==== At Ugarit ====
At Ugarit, the local variant of ʿAṯtart, ʿAṯtartu (𐎓𐎘𐎚𐎗𐎚), was devoid of any astral aspects or associations with ʿAṯtar, and she played a minor role in mythological texts, but was often mentioned in Ugaritic ritual and administrative texts, thus suggesting that she was important for the institution of the royalty.

ʿAṯtartu at Ugarit was associated with the goddess Anat, with Anat usually preceding ʿAṯtartu, and the two goddesses were often connected to each other through poetic parallelism. Both goddesses shared common traits such as perfect beauty, which characterised young goddesses, with the human Ḥuraya being compared to them in the text KTU 1.13 III using the terms lit. 'whose loveliness is like the loveliness of Anat, whose beauty is like the beauty of ʿAṯtartu' (𐎄𐎋𐎟𐎐𐎓𐎎𐎟𐎓𐎐𐎚𐎟𐎐𐎓𐎎𐎅𐎟𐎋𐎎𐎟𐎚𐎒𐎎𐎟𐎓𐎘𐎚𐎗𐎚𐎟𐎚𐎒𐎎𐎅, dāka nuʿmi ʿAnati nuʿmuha kama têsimi ʿAṯtarti têsimuha), in which Anat and ʿAṯtartu were connected through poetic parallels.

Another trait which both Anat and ʿAṯtartu shared was their love of war, and their pairing appears to have been due to their common roles as beautiful hunters and warrior goddesses. The Ugaritic ʿAṯtartu nevertheless did not yet possess the erotic traits of the later Canaanite ʿAštart.

===== As hunter goddess =====
In the text KTU 1.92, ʿAṯtartu is called ʿAṯtartu the Huntress (𐎓𐎘𐎚𐎗𐎚𐎟𐎕𐎆𐎄𐎚, ʿAṯtartu Ṣawwādatu) in the lines 2-3, with the next line mentioning her as "going to the desert" (𐎚𐎍𐎋𐎟𐎁𐎎𐎄𐎁𐎗, taliku bi-madbari). The following lines recorded that the goddess saw something whose name is lost due to damage to the text, and line 5 mentions that the deeps surge with water, which might either refer to a celestial sign or to a possible damp terrain where ʿAṯtartu was hunting. The lines 6-13 described ʿAṯtartu taking cover in the low ground and holding her weapons while hunting, and she finally slew an animal whose name is lost in line 14. Following this, ʿAṯtartu fed the animal she had slain to the gods El and Yarikh.

Thus, present in the Northwest Semitic goddess was present a trait which was also characteristic of the South Arabian masculine hypostasis of ʿAṯtar, in whose honour sacred hunts were performed as fertility rite. This hunter aspect of ʿAṯtartu later faded away by the 1st millennium BC.

In the later portion of the text KTU 1.92, ʿAṯtartu was given clothing, after which she is described as nšʾat ẓl k kbkbm (𐎐𐎌𐎀𐎚𐎟𐎑𐎍𐎟𐎋𐎟𐎋𐎁𐎋𐎁𐎎), meaning either raising a shadow like the stars, implying that ʿAṯtartu herself was brilliant and removed a shadow like the stars do, or as herself shining like the stars. This passage leads to another one in which Baal desires ʿAṯtartu for her beauty, and approaches her.

ʿAṯtartu also appears as a huntress in the text KTU 1.114, where she and her sister Anat are consistently described as hunting together and bringing back game whose meat they distributed to the gods. In this text, ʿAṯtartu is mentioned before Anat, unlike most Ugaritic texts where this order is inverted, although the two goddesses are again connected through poetic parallels in the lines 10 to 11, reading "ʿAṯtartu and Anat he approached; ʿAṯtartu had prepared a steak for him, and Anat a tenderloin" (𐎓𐎘𐎚𐎗𐎚𐎟𐎆𐎓𐎐𐎚𐎟𐎊𐎎𐎙𐎊𐎟𐎓𐎘𐎚𐎗𐎚𐎟𐎚𐎓𐎄𐎁𐎟𐎐𐎌𐎁𐎟𐎍𐎅𐎟𐎆𐎓𐎐𐎚𐎟𐎋𐎚𐎔, ʿAṯtarta wa-ʿAnata yamġiyu ʿAṯtartu taʿdubu našabi lêhu wa-ʿAnatu katipa).

===== As warrior goddess =====
Attestations of ʿAṯtartu as a warrior goddess at Ugarit are minimal, with the principal one being her role in the text KTU 1.2 I 40, where she and Anat together restrain Baal by holding, respectively, his left and right hands. This text also linked ʿAṯtartu and Anat through poetic parallelism in the lines "His right hand Anat seized, His left hand ʿAṯtartu seized" (𐎊𐎎𐎐𐎅𐎟𐎓𐎐𐎚𐎟𐎚𐎜𐎃𐎄𐎟𐎌𐎎𐎀𐎍𐎅𐎟𐎚𐎜𐎃𐎄𐎟𐎓𐎘𐎚𐎗𐎚, ymnh ʿAnatu tʾuḫd šmʾalh tʾuḫd ʿAṯtartu).

The Ugaritic text KTU 1.86, the Book of Dreams (𐎒𐎔𐎗𐎟𐎈𐎍𐎎𐎎, Sipru Ḥulumīma), mentions the horses of ʿAṯtartu, which might possibly be another allusion to her role as a warrior.

Possibly due to her role as a goddess of warfare, ʿAṯtartu was sometimes mentioned alongside the god Resheph in Ugaritic texts, such as in administrative documents, with jars of wine for the temples of ʿAṯtartu and of Resheph-gn being respectively mentioned immediately after each other in the text KTU 4.219, and in the text KTU 1.91's mentioning that the Rašpūma (lit. 'plural Rašpus'). Moreover, the attribute animal of Resheph was the lion, which was analogous to the lioness being the symbol of the warrior goddess ʿAṯtartu.

Despite the roles of ʿAṯtartu and ʿAnatu as hunter and warrior goddesses, this as at odds with the social norms of the societies where mortral women were not supposed to hunt. This characterization is made explicit in the myth of Aqhat, where Aqhat exclaims to Anat, ht tṣdn tʾinṯt (𐎅𐎚𐎟𐎚𐎕𐎄𐎐𐎟𐎚𐎛𐎐𐎘𐎚), meaning either "now do womenfolk hunt?" as a question, or "now womenfolk hunt!" sarcastically, to contrast her with mortal women, who were not supposed to hunt.

Thus, while Baal and Resheph were both hunter gods, the roles of ʿAṯtartu and Anat as hunter and warrior goddesses made them peers with the male gods. Sometimes they were even mentors, such as Anat in the story of Aqhat, in which she addresses him with the intimate term "my brother" and tells him that she will instruct him in hunting, thus being able to bond with the addressee and be present and active in him development into an accomplished hunter.

The episode of ʿAṯtartu performing filial duties by "shutting down the jaws" of the enemies of El was another case where the goddess successfully performed actions which among mortals were usually done by men.

===== As healer goddess =====
In the text KTU 1.114, ʿAṯtartu and Anat also went to hunt for ingredients to cure the drunkenness of El, to whose household they belonged, and they are later mentioned in the narrative as applying the components of the cure to cause the healing, thus connecting the two goddesses with healing.

Among the Ugaritic incantations mentioning ʿAṯtartu are two where she is invoked to protect against snakebites: in the first incantation, from the text KTU 1.100, which is part of a sequence addressed to the sun-goddess Shapash to be delivered to a succession of deities, she is mentioned immediately after Anat, and the two goddesses' names are combined in the form "Anat and ʿAṯtartu at ʾInbubu" (𐎓𐎐𐎚𐎟𐎆𐎟𐎓𐎘𐎚𐎗𐎚𐎟𐎛𐎐𐎁𐎁𐎅, ʿAnatu-wa-ʿAṯtartu ʾInbubaha), and the incantation itself is intended to be delivered to Anat's home at ʾInbubu, thus putting ʿAṯtartu on a secondary level compared to Anat. ʿAṯtartu was also mentioned on the side of the tablet on which the inscription was written. In this incantation, the first instance of ʿAṯtartu was that of ʿAṯtartu of Ugarit, while the second one was ʿAṯtartu of Mari.

In a second incantation against snakebites, from the text KTU 1.107, ʿAṯtartu was mentioned after Anat in a pairing of the two goddesses as part of a list also including pairings of Baal and Dagon, and Resheph and Yarikh.

A third incantation, from the text KTU 92.2016, either against fever or for good childbirth, mentioned "Baal and the holy ones in the river" (𐎁𐎓𐎍𐎟𐎖𐎄𐎌𐎎𐎟𐎁𐎐𐎅𐎗, Baʿli qadišūma bi-nahri), followed by "the torrent of ʿAṯtartu, in the Raḥbānu" (𐎐𐎃𐎍𐎟𐎓𐎘𐎚𐎗𐎚𐎟𐎁𐎟𐎗𐎈𐎁𐎐, naḫla ʿAṯtarti bi-Raḥbāni), itself in turn followed by "in the sea" (𐎁𐎊𐎎, bi-Yammi), suggesting that this incantation alluded to three distinct water bodies.

===== As leonine goddess =====
ʿAṯtartu's emblem was the lion, and she was explicitly called a lioness and a panther in the hymn RIH 98/02, which reads:

Ugaritic text

𐎌𐎎𐎟𐎓𐎘𐎚𐎗𐎚𐎟𐎖𐎍𐎟𐎊𐎌𐎗𐎟
𐎛𐎏𐎎𐎗𐎟𐎍𐎁𐎛𐎟𐎌𐎎𐎟𐎍𐎁𐎛𐎟𐎌𐎎𐎟𐎚𐎋𐎌𐎄𐎟𐎍
𐎚𐎕𐎔𐎖𐎟𐎍𐎈𐎚𐎟𐎄𐎟𐎂𐎗𐎟𐎛𐎍
𐎐𐎎𐎗𐎟𐎈𐎘𐎗𐎚𐎟𐎓𐎘𐎚𐎗𐎚
𐎐𐎎𐎗𐎟𐎈𐎘𐎗𐎚𐎟𐎚𐎗𐎖𐎕

Transliteration

šuma ʿAṯtarti qāla yašir
ʾiḏmara šuma labʾi šuma takaššidu lê
taṣpiq laḥata dā gūri ʾIli
namiru ḥaṯiratu ʿAṯtartu
namiru ḥaṯiratu tarquṣu

Translation

The name of ʿAṯtartu may my voice sing,
May I praise the name of the lioness. O name, may you be victorious...
May you shut the jaws of El's attackers.
A mighty panther is ʿAṯtartu,
A mighty panther that pounces.

The hymn especially emphasizes ʿAṯtartu and her name, with its mention of the goddess as "name" possibly being connected to her role as the Name-of-Baal, and the second line calls her a "lioness" while the fourth and fifth lines liken her to a panther. This association of ʿAṯtartu with the lion corroborates with significant comparative evidence from ancient West Asia and North Africa:

- ʿAṯtartu's East Semitic equivalent, ᴰIštar (𒀭𒀹𒁯), also had a lion as her attribute animal;
- one of ʿAṯtartu's Egyptian hypostases, the goddess Qetesh, is depicted standing on a lion on a plaque where she is given the triple name of Qetesh-ʿAstart-ʿAnat (𓈎𓐰𓂧𓈙𓐰𓏏𓐱𓆇𓉻𓐰𓏛𓊃𓐰𓍿𓂋𓐰𓏤𓏏𓐰𓆇𓂝𓐰𓈖𓐰𓍿𓇋𓏏𓐰𓆇𓆗, Qdšt-Ꜥsṯrt-Ꜥnṯt);
- ʿAṯtartu herself was identified with multiple lion-goddesses in Egypt;
- the Punic goddess Tanit, whose name was linked to that of ʿAṯtartu's later Phoenician iteration, ʿAštart, was represented with a lion's head;
- the masculine counterpart of ʿAṯtartu, ʿAṯtaru, was also called "Lion" (𐎍𐎁𐎜, labaʾu).

ʿAṯtartu in her form as a lioness might have been invoked as a theophoric element in the personal names Šuma-labʾi (𐎌𐎎𐎍𐎁𐎛, 'Name of the Lioness'), and ʿAbdi-Labiʾti (𐎓𐎁𐎄𐎍𐎁𐎛𐎚, 'Servant of the Lioness'), the latter of which holds the same meaning as the personal names ʿAbdi-ʿAširti (𒁹𒀴𒀀𒅆𒅕𒋾) and ʿAbdi-ʿAštarti (𒁹𒀴𒀭𒈹), both meaning "Servant of ʿAṯtartu."

====== Manifestations ======
One of the manifestations of ʿAṯtartu attested in the Late Bronze Age was ʿAṯtartu Ḫurri (𐎓𐎘𐎚𐎗𐎚𐎟𐎃𐎗), whose name has been variously interpreted as ʿAṯtartu of the Hurrians, ʿAṯtartu of the Grotto or Cavern, ʿAṯtartu of the Tomb(s), or ʿAṯtartu of the Window, and was also recorded at Ugarit in Akkadian as ᴰʿAṯtartu Ḫurri (𒀭𒌋𒁯 𒄯𒊑), and as ᴰIštar Ḫurri (𒀭𒌋𒁯 𒄷𒊑).

Some Ugaritic texts identified ʿAṯtartu with the Hurrian goddesses ʾIšḫara and Šauška and supporters of the interpretation of the name ʿAṯtartu Ḫurri as "ʿAṯtartu of the Hurrians" suggest that this manifestation of ʿAṯtartu was the one identified with the Hurrian goddess Šauška.

Other possible manifestations of ʿAṯtartu at Ugarit might have included ʿAṯtartu ndrg (𐎓𐎘𐎚𐎗𐎚𐎟𐎐𐎄𐎗𐎂) and ʿAṯtartu ʾabḏr (𐎓𐎘𐎚𐎗𐎚𐎟𐎀𐎁𐎏𐎗), of still uncertain meaning, with the latter being affixed with the title Qadišatu (𐎖𐎄𐎌𐎚, 'the Holy One').

===== As member of the household of El =====
In in the hymn RIH 98/02, ʿAṯtartu is called on to shut the jaw of El's attackers in the line "May she shut the jaw of El's attackers" (𐎚𐎕𐎔𐎖𐎟𐎍𐎈𐎚𐎟𐎄𐎟𐎂𐎗𐎟𐎛𐎍, taṣpiq laḥata dā gūri ʾIli), which finds a literary parallel in the myth of Aqhat, where the titular hero Aqhat is instructed to "shut the jaw of his (father's) detractors" (𐎉𐎁𐎖𐎟𐎍𐎈𐎚𐎟𐎐𐎛𐎕𐎅, ṭābiqu laḥatê nāʾiṣihu), thus signaling ʿAṯtartu as performing filial duties by protecting El, the patriarch of whose household she was a member of.

===== As consort of Baal =====
Although there is little to no evidence of ʿAṯtartu being explicitly considered the consort of Baal at Ugarit, the text KTU 1.114 did refer to Baal as sexually desiring ʿAṯtartu, with possible mention of a bed in line 32 of the text perhaps alluding to these two deities engaging in sexual intercourse.

Although the once widespread view that Anat was also a consort of Baal has recently fallen out of favour due to lack of evidence from Ugarit, indirect evidence, such as Egyptian adaptations of West Semitic myths in which both ʿAṯtartu and Anat were the consorts of Baal might constitute indirect evidence that this might also have been the case at Ugarit.

Sacrifice to ʿAṯtartu might have been included in the list of sacrifices for the family of Baal in the Ugaritic text KTU 1.148.16 possibly because ʿAṯtartu might have been regarded as the consort of Baal at Ugarit. Contemporary sources, including Egyptian adaptations of West Semitic myths which feature ʿAṯtartu and Anat as the brides of Baal, and later sources, such as the role of the Phoenician ʿAštart as the consort of Baal, also suggest that ʿAṯtartu was a consort of Baal, although this evidence is still very uncertain and this pairing appears to have been distinctly Levantine.

====== As the "Name of Baal" ======
Another connection between ʿAṯtartu and Baal was through her name ʿAṯtartu-Name-of-Baal (Ugaritic: 𐎓𐎘𐎚𐎗𐎚𐎟𐎌𐎎𐎟𐎁𐎓𐎍, romanized: ʿAṯtartu šuma Baʿli). This name defined the identity of the goddess as being in relation to Baal.

ʿAṯtartu's role as the Name-of-Baal might also have been connected to the use of Baal's name as a magical weapon, such as in the text KTU 1.2 IV 28, where one line reads "By Name, ʿAṯtartu hexed (Yammu)" (𐎁𐎌𐎎𐎟𐎚𐎂𐎓𐎗𐎎𐎟𐎓𐎘𐎚𐎗𐎚, bi-šumi tigʿaruma ʿAṯtartu), in reference to ʿAṯtartu invoking the power of Baal's name and his titles, such as "Mighty Baal" (𐎀𐎍𐎛𐎊𐎐𐎟𐎁𐎓𐎍, ʾalʾiyanu Baʿlu) and "Rider of the Clouds" (𐎗𐎋𐎁𐎟𐎓𐎗𐎔𐎚, rākibu ʿurpati), to hex the god Yammu.

===== Cult =====
The Ugaritic deity-lists gave minimal importance to ʿAṯtartu in the realm of rituals, and she was the last mentioned in several of these, although she was nevertheless important politically for the ruling dynasty of Ugarit and the administration of that city-state, being thus associated with the institution of the monarchy. In one letter to the king of Ugarit concerning maritime commercial activities with Cyprus, the lines 6 to 9 read "I do indeed speak to Baal Ṣapānu, to the Eternal Sun, to ʿAṯtartu, to Anat, to all the gods of Cyprus" (𐎀𐎐𐎋𐎐𐎟𐎗𐎂𐎎𐎚𐎟𐎍𐎟𐎁𐎓𐎍𐎟𐎕𐎔𐎐𐎟𐎍𐎟𐎌𐎔𐎌𐎟𐎓𐎍𐎎𐎟𐎍𐎟𐎓𐎘𐎚𐎗𐎚𐎟𐎍𐎟𐎓𐎐𐎚𐎟𐎍𐎟𐎋𐎍𐎟𐎛𐎍𐎟𐎀𐎍𐎘𐎊, ʾanākuna ragamtu lê Baʿli Ṣapuni lê Šapši ʿālami lê ʿAṯtarti lê ʿAnati lê Kulli ʾIlī ʾAlaṯiya), placing Baal and ʿAṯtartu in the initial position and naming ʿAṯtartu first, before the other Ugaritic goddesses, indicating the political importance of ʿAṯtartu at Ugarit.

The temple of ʿAṯtartu was likely located within the city of Ugarit, perhaps within the complex of the city's royal palace itself, with administrative records mentioning the existence of cultic personnel devoted to the goddess at this temple, the Ugaritic Akkadian text RS 20.235 referring to a servant of the goddess and the text KTU 4.163 mentioning singers of ʿAṯtartu, while the text KTU 4.219 contains the record of a payment of silver for the temple of the goddess immediately before that of a payment for the temple of the god Resheph.

Ugaritic administrative texts also mentioned the use of wine in the royal rituals pertaining to ʿAṯtartu, with the ritual text KTU 1.112 mentioning the offering of a jar of wine to the goddess's manifestation of ʿAṯtartu Ḫurri.

The texts KTU 4.242 I 1 and 11 mention clothing for the statue of ʿAṯtartu Šadî (𐎓𐎘𐎚𐎗𐎚𐎟𐎌𐎄, lit. 'ʿAṯtartu of the field'), who was identified with the North Syrian goddess ᴰIštar Ṣēri (𒀭𒈹𒂔, lit. 'Ištar of the steppe land'), with ʿAṯtartu Šadî herself being referred to as Ištar Ṣēri in Akkadian texts from Ugarit. Ištar Ṣēri was invoked as a divine witness in an oath between the kings of Ugarit and Carchemish, further attesting of her importance for the royalty of Ugarit, and she appears to have been popular enough in northern Syria and the Hittite Empire that she was worshipped in Hatti, where her name was written as Uliliyaš ᴰIštar (𒀭𒈹𒆤).

Although ʿAṯtartu had none of the erotic traits of her later Canaanite variant, ʿAṯtartu Šadî/Ištar Ṣēri was nevertheless present in hierogamy royal entry rituals whereby a statue or a woman representing the goddess was inserted in the alcove of Ugarit's royal palace.

Due to these aspects of the goddess, Akkadian texts from Ugarit and Emar identified ʿAṯtartu with her Mesopotamian counterpart Ištar, with the Akkadian milieu within which the Ugaritic texts were composed not distinguishing ʿAṯtartu from Ištar, and the Akkadian text RS. 17.22 + 17.87 from Ugarit referred to a second temple of hers as the "kunaḫi-temple of Ištar."

==== At Emar ====
ʿAṯtart was imported from the Levant into the Amorite city-state of Emar during the Late Bronze Age, where she received a major cult and possessed a temple at the highest point of the city of Emar itself, with a treasure of existing there of ʿAṯtartu ša āli (𒀭𒈹 𒍅, lit. 'ʿAṯtart of the City'). Like at Ugarit, she did not exhibit any astral traits and was not associated to her masculine counterpart, ʿAṯtar.

ʿAṯtart was worshipped at Emar, where, like at Mari, the name of the goddess was written in cuneiform using ideograms and without the feminine suffix -t, in the forms ᴰaš-dar (𒀭𒀸𒁯) and ᴰinanna (𒀭𒈹), while also appearing in ritual texts and onomastica there. ʿAṯtart at Emar was worshipped under various manifestations, such as:

- ʿAṯtartu ša abī, variously interpreted as "ʿAṯtart of the Sea," ʿAṯtart as patron-goddess of the abû shrines and of the month Abî, or "ʿAṯtart of the fathers";
- ʿAṯtartu ša tāḫāzi (𒀭𒀹𒁯 𒀞, lit. 'ʿAṯtart of Battle');
- ʿAṯtartu ša duriši (lit. 'ʿAṯtart of Trampling').

===== As warrior goddess =====
ʿAṯtart's role as a warrior goddess is more attested at Emar due to the widespread reference of the manifestation of ʿAṯtart as ʿAṯtart of Battle (𒀭𒀹𒁯 𒀞, ʿAṯtartu ša tāḫāzi), who was also the main basis of the cult of this goddess at Emar.

The warrior role of ʿAṯtart at Emar is also attested in the use of her name as a theophoric element in personal names such as ʿAṯtartu-qarrād (𒀸𒋻𒋾 𒌨𒊕, 'ʿAṯtart is a warrior') and ʿAṯtartu-lit (lit. 'ʿAṯtart is power').

The cult of ʿAṯtartu of Battle was performed by a priestess called the mašʾartu (𒈠𒀸𒅈𒌈), and the participants of her night festival were called the awīlû ša tāḫāzi (𒇽𒎌 𒋫𒄩𒍣, lit. 'men of the battle').

===== As hunter goddess =====
ʿAṯtart's connection to hunting at Emar in ritual settings is recorded in a text mentioning "on the 16th day is the hunt of ʿAṯtart" (𒄿𒈾 𒌋𒐋 𒌓𒈪 𒍝𒁺 𒊭 𒀭𒀸𒁯, ina 16 umi ṣadu ša ᴰAštart), that is the hunt of ʿAṯtart which was performed on the 16th of the month of Abi. This ritual hunt was performed on the same day as the procession to her manifestation of the Poplar ʿAṯtart (𒀭𒀸𒋻 𒍝𒅈𒁀, ʿAṯtar ṣarba) from "the storehouse", which ascribes to ʿAṯtart agricultural traits otherwise unknown of her elsewhere during the Bronze Age.

The line 𒄿𒈾 𒌋𒐋 𒌓𒈪 𒍝𒁺 𒊭 𒀭𒀸𒁯 also parallels the Sabaic hallowed phrase "the day when he performed the hunt for ʿAṯtar" (𐩺𐩥𐩣 𐩮𐩵 𐩮𐩺𐩵 𐩲𐩻𐩩𐩧, ywm ṣd ṣyd ʿṯtr), used to refer to the ritual hunts performed for the South Arabian god ʿAṯtar, who was himself a masculine counterpart of ʿAṯtart.

Another Emarite text records that the hunt of ʿAṯtart was performed on the 16th of the month of Marzaḫāni, with the hunt of Baal being on the 17th of this same month, and both hunts being mentioned together in the texts from Emar, suggesting that the hunt of the goddess involved game or provisions, and that ʿAṯtart and Baal appeared together at Emar, likely under the influence of their pairing in the Levant; Baal himself appears as a hunter at Ugarit, but never alongside ʿAṯtart as he does at Emar.

===== As consort of Baal =====
Although it was the pairing of the Hurro-Syrian goddess Ḫebat and Baal which was the principal divine couple at Emar, and despite there being no evidence yet that ʿAṯtart was explicitly paired with Baal at Emar as she was among the Canaanites, ʿAṯtart and Baal nevertheless had temples dedicated in common to both of them, and a common cult to this pair is suggested from the appearance of their names as theophoric elements in the popular personal names Zū-ʿAṯtarti (𒍪𒀸𒋻𒋾, 'The one of ʿAṯtart') and Zū-Baʿla (𒍪𒁀𒀪𒆷, 'The one of Baal'). There is nonetheless little beyond this curcumstantial evidence at Emar for any pairing of ʿAṯtart with Baal, which appears to have been a Levantine occurrence.

===== Legacy =====
The worship of ʿAṯtart in the Middle Euphrates region, including at Emar, lasted until the Late Bronze Age.

By the Iron Age, the name of ʿAṯtart appears to have become used to mean "goddess" in general, so that an Akkadian inscription from the city of Ḫanat referred to the goddess ʿAnat as "the strongest of the ʿAṯtarts (goddesses)" (𒁉𒋥 𒀭𒁹𒁯𒈨𒌍, gašrat ištarāti).

=== In Egypt ===
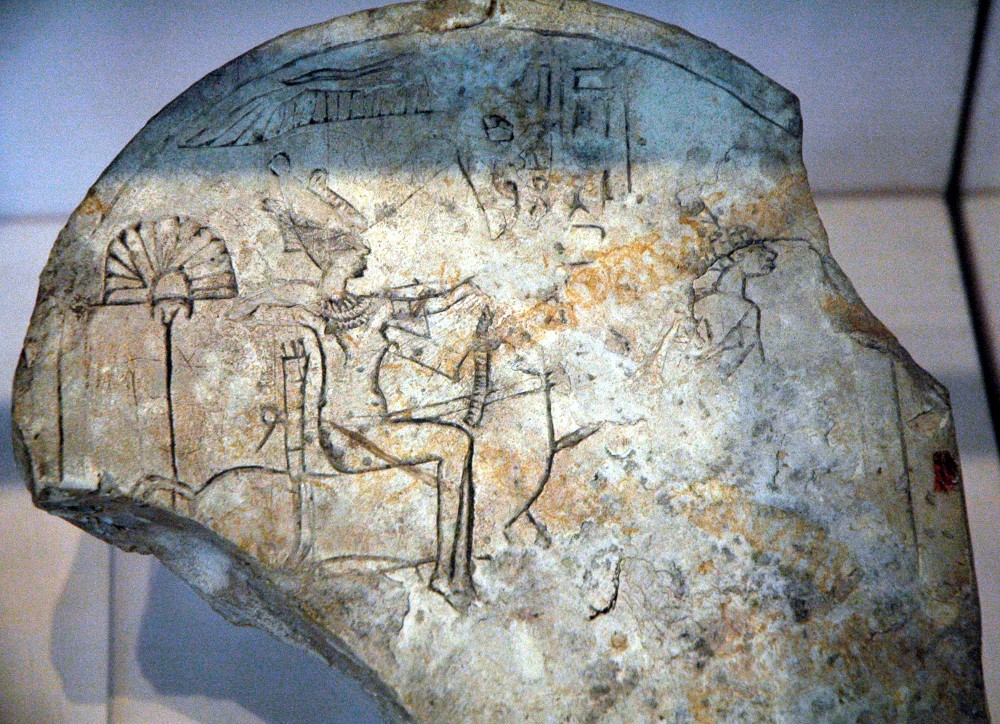
Archer Astarte riding a horse on an Egyptian stele

ʿAṯtart was eventually imported into New Kingdom Egypt, where she was renowned as a West Semitic war-goddess and often appeared alongside ʿAnat, with the West Semitic association of the two goddesses having also been borrowed by the Egyptians. Her cult is attested in Egypt from as early as the reign of Amenhotep II in the 15th century BC, and the goddess herself was attested under various manifestations, such as Ꜥꜣstjr ḫꜣrw (𓉻𓐰𓂝𓐰𓊃𓍘𓇋𓂋𓐰𓏤𓑅𓑅𓆼𓄿𓃭𓐰𓏤𓐱𓉐) and Ꜥꜣsyty ḫꜣwrw (𓉻𓐰𓂝𓋴𓏭𓍘𓇌𓆼𓏲𓐰𓃭𓐰𓏤𓆗), that is the same form of the goddess whose name in Ugaritic was ʿAṯtart Ḫurri.

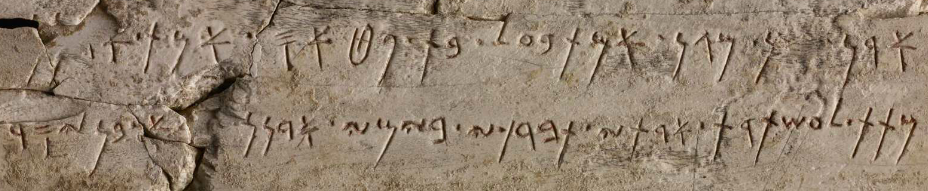
Ur Box inscription, a dedication to Astarte by the daughter of Peṭ-ʾIsi (𐤐𐤈𐤀𐤎, lit. 'Given by Isis')

The cult of ʿAṯtart would remain well-established in Late Period Egypt, during the 1st millennium BC, at Memphis, where a significant community of Semitic origin had been living since the New Kingdom, and where a temple of the goddess was part of the city's temple of the god Ptah. From at least as early as the 6th century BC, ʿAṯtart was identified with the Egyptian goddess Isis, and a 7th-century BC ivory box discovered at Ur and which had been dedicated to ʿAṯtart by the daughter of one an individual whose name, Peṭ-ʾIsi, (𐤐𐤈𐤀𐤎) meant "Given by Isis", might have originated in Egypt.

==== As warrior goddess ====
Under the 18th and 19th dynasties, ʿAṯtart was depicted either standing or on horseback and holding a sword and shield, and she was sometimes associated to the god Resheph just like she was at Ugarit due to her warrior role, as attested through a stela of Amenhotep II which includes a line mentioning both them together, "Resheph and ʿAṯtart were rejoicing in him doing all that his heart desired" (𓂋𓐰𓈙𓐰𓊪𓀭𓂝𓐰𓊃𓍘𓂋𓐰𓏤𓐱𓏏𓅱𓆗𓎛𓂝𓐰𓏲𓀠𓇋𓅓𓐰𓆑𓁷𓐰𓏤𓁹𓐰𓏏𓌸𓂋𓐰𓂋𓐰𓏏𓎟𓐰𓏏𓄣𓐱𓏤𓐰𓆑, Ršp Ꜥstjrtw ḥꜥw jmf ḥr jrt mrrt nbt jbf), and both deities were depicted and mentioned on a private votive stele found at the site of Tell el-Borg in the Sinai.

During this period, some of the Levantine myths regarding ʿAṯtart were translated into Egyptian, as attested by the fragmented Papyrus so-called of "ʿAṯtart and the Sea," the Egyptian translation of a West Semitic myth in which ʿAṯtart is called a "furious and tempestuous goddess" (nṯrt qndt nšny).

During the 20th dynasty, one of the inscriptions of Ramesses III recording his military victories against the Libyans mentioned ʿAnat and ʿAṯtart in a praise to the king, "Montu and Set are with him in every battle; ʿAnat and ʿAṯtart are a shield to him" (𓏠𓐰𓈖𓐰𓍿𓅱𓀭𓃩𓂋𓎛𓈖𓐰𓂝𓆑𓐰𓐝𓋴𓎞𓇌𓐱𓀜𓐰𓏥𓎟𓐰𓂝𓈖𓐰𓍿𓏏𓐰𓆇𓆗𓂝𓐰𓊃𓐰𓍿𓇋𓂋𓐰𓏤𓍿𓏏𓐰𓆇𓆗𓈖𓐰𓆑𓐰𓐝𓇋𓆎𓐰𓐝𓌲, Mnṯw Stẖ r ḥnꜥf m skw nb Ꜥnṯt Ꜥsṯjrṯt nf m jkm); and a poem contained the lines "the yoke saddles of your chariot: they are ʿAnat and ʿAṯtart" (𓂧𓐰𓏏𓐱𓏤𓆱𓐰𓏥𓈖𓏏𓐰𓄿𓇌𓐰𓎡𓅓𓐰𓂝𓏭𓐰𓂋𓐱𓏤𓎡𓐰𓄿𓃀𓏲𓍘𓏏𓆱𓂝𓐰𓈖𓍘𓇋𓏏𓐰𓆇𓆗𓂝𓐰𓊃𓍘𓏭𓐰𓂋𓐱𓏤𓍘𓇋𓏏𓐰𓆇𓆗, ḏrwt n tꜣyk mꜥkꜣbwtjt Ꜥntjt Ꜥstyrtjt), which likened his chariot to the two goddesses.

ʿAṯtart was also worshipped at the Temple of Hibis in the Kharga Oasis, where she is depicted, under the name Ꜥsṯt (𓂝𓐰𓊃𓐰𓍿𓏏𓐰𓆇𓁐), three times on a 5th-century BC relief, followed by Resheph.

During the Ptolemaic period, ʿAṯtart was depicted on a chariot in a relief from the Temple of Edfu, where she is called "ʿAṯtart, Mistress of Horses, Lady of the Chariot" (𓂝𓐰𓊃𓍿𓐰𓂋𓂧𓏏𓐰𓆇𓁐𓎛𓏌𓐰𓏏𓊃𓐰𓐝𓊃𓐰𓐝𓃗𓐰𓏥𓎟𓅨𓐰𓂋𓇌𓏏𓐰𓆱, Ꜥsṯrdt ḥnwt smsmw nbt wryt).

==== As healer goddess ====
In a medical papyrus from the 14th century BC, which contains a Northwest Semitic inscription written in Hieratic, the goddess, who is called Jsttr, appears as a healer, and is mentioned alongside Jšꜣmjnꜣ, that is the Northwest Semitic healer-god Eshmun, to whom she would be often found associated later in Iron Age Phoenicia.

ʿAṯtart was still remembered as a huntress goddess during the Iron Age, and she was mentioned as such in a 5th-century BC Aramaic incantation against scorpion stings inscribed in Demotic from the Wādī al-Ḥammāmāt, whose text includes the lines "Hand of my father, hand of Baal, hand of ʿAttar my mother!" (kp-ʾbwy kp-Bʿl kp-ʿtr-ʾmy) and "Face of Baal! Cover, coat his wounds (with spittle)! Face of the Huntress (and) face of Baal!" (ʾnpy-Bʿl ksy šʿ-ḥrtw ʾnpy-ṣydtʾ ʾnpy-Bʿl).

==== As hunter goddess ====
ʿAṯtart in the Wādī al-Ḥammāmāt text was referred to both as "ʿAttar my mother" and "the huntress", attesting of the continuation of the healer role of this goddess recorded since the Bronze Age at Ugarit, as well as of her pairing with Baal. The incantation's invocation of ʿAṯtart and Baal against the "enemy", that is the scorpion which has stung an individual, parallels the combat of these deities against cosmic or divine enemies in the Ugaritic texts.

==== As consort of Set ====
In the 20th dynasty text, "The Contendings of Horus and Seth", ʿAnat and ʿAṯtart are referred to as divine daughters who are also the future wives of the god Set, whom the Egyptians identified with Baal.

A Late Bronze Age seal from Egyptian-ruled Palestine discovered at the site of Baytīn represented ʿAṯtart as a warrior, and was inscribed with the name of the goddess, written as ꜥsṯjrṯ (𓂝𓐰𓊃𓍿𓐰𓏥𓁹𓐰𓍿).

In the story of "ʿAṯtart and the Sea," which is an Egyptian translation of a Levantine mythological tradition, the Ennead, which in this story stood for the West Semitic divine council headed by El, initially offers tribute to the sea-god Yam to be given to him by the goddess Renenutet, and after this proves to be unsuccessful, they send him more appealing tribute to be delivered to him by ʿAṯtart, who weeps on being informed of this. When she goes to Yam, he sees her singing and laughing and addresses her as a "furious and tempestuous goddess" (nṯrt qndt nšny), and then instructs her to ask the Ennead to give him their daughter, with ʿAṯtart's tribute being unsuccessful since it is followed by a conflict between Set and Yam following the Levantine tradition of the contest between Baal and Yammu.

===== As the "Face of Baal" =====
ʿAṯtart was called "Face of Baal" (ʾnpy-Bʿl) in the Wādī al-Ḥammāmāt inscription, which defined the goddess as representing the presence of the god Baal, especially in his temple. This usage of the name of a deity to represent their presence is also attested among the Phoenicians, who called the goddess Tanit as "the Face of Baal (Hammon)" (𐤐𐤍 𐤁𐤏𐤋, panē Baʿl), and among Israelites, in the verse of Book of Psalms of the Bible reading "Ascribe to Yahweh the glory due his name" (הָב֣וּ לַֽ֭יהוָה כְּב֣וֹד שְׁמ֑וֹ, hāḇū YHWH kəḇōḏ šəmō).

=== In Canaan ===
Following the end of the Bronze Age, the Canaanite peoples during the Iron Age continued worshipping ʿAṯtart under the name of ʿAštart (𐤏𐤔𐤕𐤓𐤕), who was a continuation of her Ugaritic form, ʿAṯtart.

During the 11th to 10th centuries BC, the early Canaanites invoked the lioness aspect of their variant of ʿAštart through inscriptions bearing the name ʿAbd-labʾit (𐤏𐤁𐤃𐤋𐤁𐤀𐤕), meaning "Servant of the Lioness (that is, lit. 'Servant of ʿAštart'), on arrowheads along with the name Bin-ʿAnat (𐤁𐤍𐤏𐤍𐤕), meaning "Son of Anat," implying that ʿAštart and ʿAnat were the patron-goddesses of the warriors who used these arrows.

==== In Phoenicia ====
The Phoenician variant of ʿAštart was the goddess ʿAštart (𐤏𐤔𐤕𐤓𐤕). By the time that the Canaanite Phoenician civilisation had emerged in the 1st millennium BC, ʿAštart overshadowed the other Semitic goddesses in the Phoenician pantheon and had become the main personification of a less war-like and more sensual vitality.

Like her East Semitic equivalent, Ishtar, the Phoenician ʿAštart was a complex goddess with multiple aspects: being the feminine principle of the life-giving force, ʿAštart was a fertility goddess who promoted love and sensuality, in which capacity she presided over the reproduction of cattle and family growth; the goddess was also the consort of the masculine principle of this life-giving force, variously personified as Hadad or Baal, who himself incarnated plant growth and presided over rain, water, springs, floods, and the sprouting and growth of cereals. This pairing of ʿAštart and Baal was later mentioned in the 1st century AD by Philōn of Byblos, who wrote about the goddess Astarte and Zeus (that is, Baal), called Adōdos (itself a Hellenisation of Phoenician Hadad) and Dēmarous, ruling over the land with the consent of Kronos (that is, ʾEl).

As well as the goddess of carnal love and of fertility, ʿAštart was also a warrior goddess, although she no longer exhibited much of the hunter aspect of the Bronze Age ʿAṯtart, which had faded away so that by the 1st millennium BC the hunting scenes on the shrine of the Phoenician ʿAštart at the temple of Bustān aš-Šayḫ depicted her consort in the city-state of Ṣidōn, the god Eshmun, as a male hunter figure; ʿAštart was also a celestial goddess possessing astral traits and who was identified with the Morning Star, and occasionally to the Moon. The dove was a sacred animal of ʿAštart, as, like with her East Semitic equivalent Ishtar, was the lion.

The cult of ʿAštart reached its highest level of prestige among the Phoenicians, in both mainland Phoenicia and thanks to the extensive maritime trade endeavours of the Phoenicians, in the Phoenician, and later Punic, colonies throughout the Mediterranean world, with her worship being recorded in Cyprus, as well as in Punic Africa and Sicily, with the oldest recorded mention of the Phoenician ʿAštart is from an 8th-century inscription from a bronze statuette, often called the Seville statuette or the El Carambolo statuette, which had been imported into Iberia from mainland Phoenicia.

During the Hellenistic period, the Phoenicians identified their own goddess ʿAštart with the Egyptian goddess Isis) due to the influence of the Egyptian Osiris myth on their own conceptualisations of the afterlife and salvation.

Among the Phoenician and Punic personal names containing the name of ʿAštart were ʿAštart-ʿaz (𐤏𐤔𐤕𐤓𐤕𐤏𐤆, lit. 'ʿAštart is my strength', already attested in Amorite Mari as ᴰAštart-azi, 𒀭𒀸𒁯𒋫𒍣), and Gidd-ʿAštart (𐤂𐤃𐤏𐤔𐤕𐤓𐤕).

===== Iconography =====
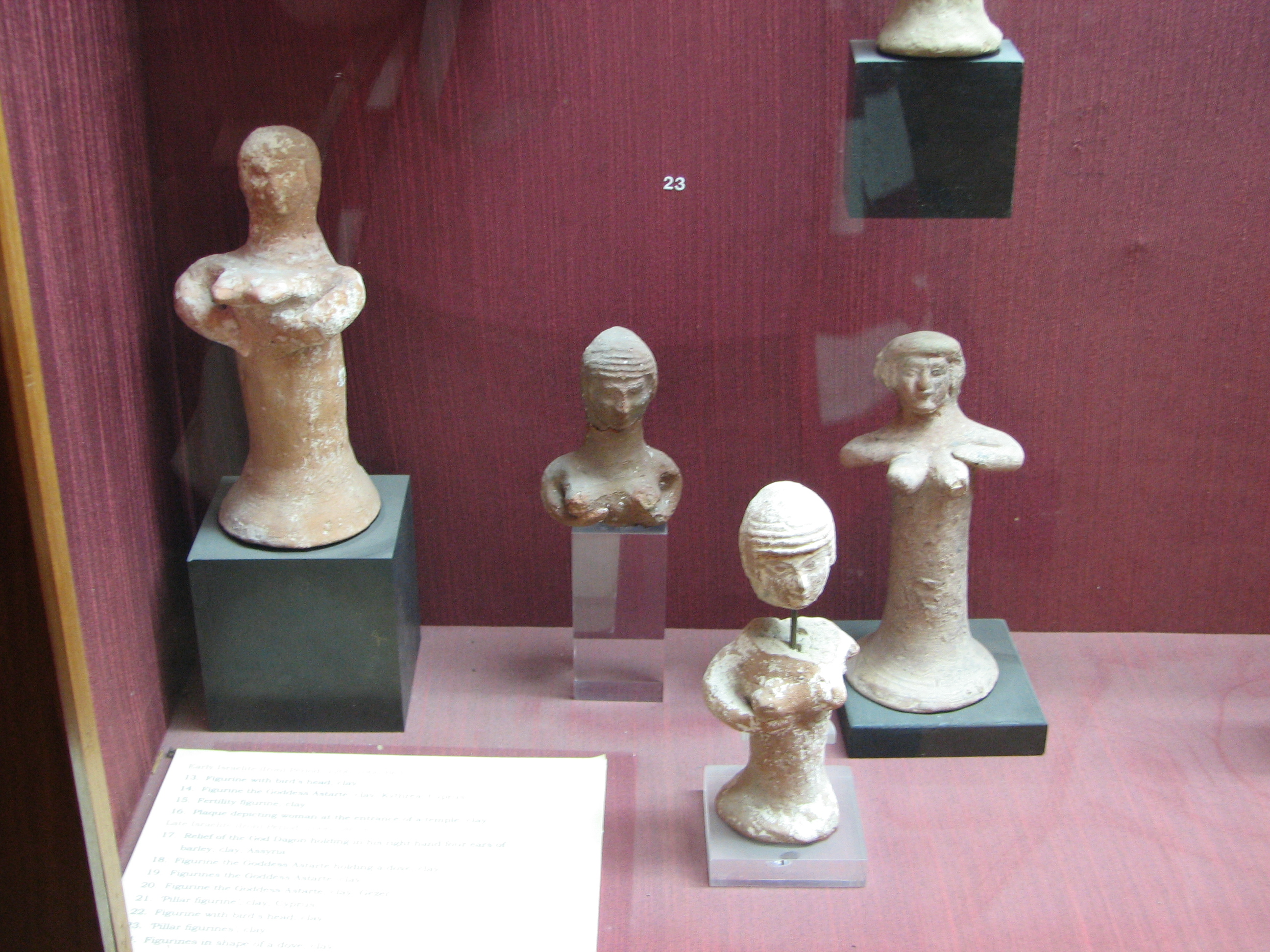
Standard naked idols from Israel and Judea

ʿAštart was often depicted as a naked goddess because of her role as a fertility and sexuality goddess, and many terracotta figures of naked women found in Israel and Judea were depictions of ʿAštart, although not every image of a naked woman from this location was a representation of her. ʿAštart was also depicted in the form of "concubines of the dead" statuettes placed in burials, as well as in sympathetic magic figurines possessing fertile traits intended to ensure that women desiring to have children would become pregnant.

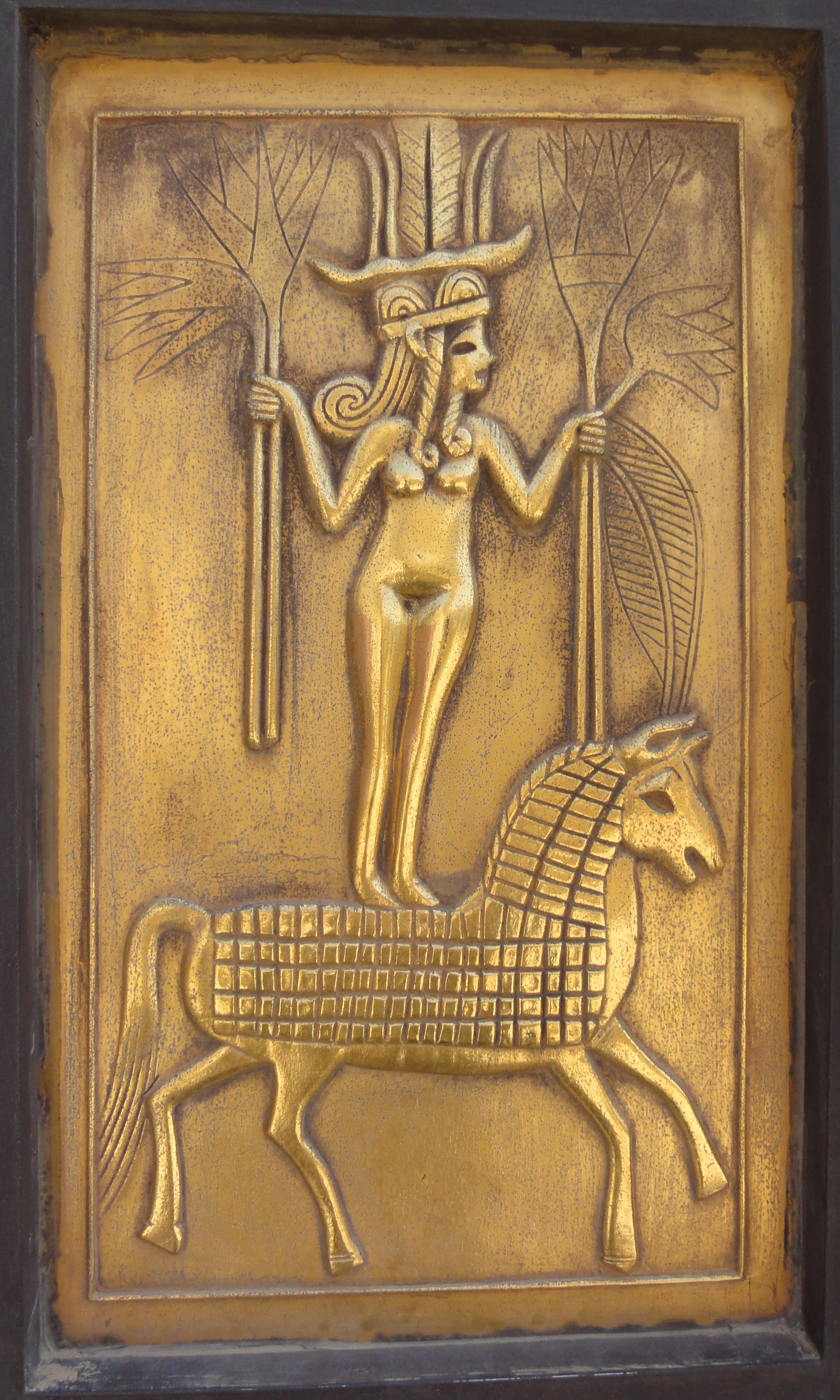
A modern reproduction af an ancient tablet depicting a naked woman standing of a horse

Images of an armed goddess might also have been representation of ʿAštart as a goddess of war and hunting, due to which she was often depicted on horseback or on a war chariot, sometimes holding an epsilon axe.

ʿAštart was often depicted with a "Hathoric" hairstyle, which connected her with the Phoenician ivory sculptures of the woman at the window and to amulets representing a goddess who was analogous to Qetesh. ʿAštart was also sometimes depicted surrounded by twin gods in some Phoenician coins.

===== ʿAštart Ḥor =====
Although the wooden throne upon which the Seville/El Carambolo Statuette rested had perished, its surviving bronze stool was inscribed with a dedication to ʿAštart Ḥor (𐤏𐤔𐤕𐤓𐤕 𐤇𐤓), that is to the Phoenician form of the manifestation ʿAṯtartu Ḫurri already attested in pre-Phoenician times, or maybe associated with Aphrodite of the salt marshes.

The cult of ʿAštart Ḥor held a certain importance, especially as part of royal rituals, and her domains were located at Šuksu, and at Ṣaʾu, a town belonging to the city-state of Siyannu.

===== As the "Name of Baal" =====
Another manifestation of ʿAštart was "ʿAštart-Name-of-Baal" (𐤏𐤔𐤕𐤓𐤕 𐤔𐤌 𐤁𐤏𐤋, ʿAštart šim Baʿl), who was the Phoenician form of "ʿAṯtartu-Name-of-Baal" (𐎓𐎘𐎚𐎗𐎚𐎟𐎌𐎎𐎟𐎁𐎓𐎍, ʿAṯtartu šuma Baʿli) already attested in the Bronze Age at Ugarit. This name defined the identity of the goddess as being in relation to Baal.

===== At Sidon =====
The worship of ʿAštart at the Phoenician city-state of Sidon dates from the Late Bronze Age, when her name was recorded in Hittite texts, Ugaritic epics, and evocatory formulae.

The royal family of Ṣidōn worshipped ʿAštart, with several of its members bearing names in which the name of ʿAštart appears as a theophoric element, such as ʾImmī-ʿAštart (𐤀𐤌𐤏𐤔𐤕𐤓𐤕), Bōd-ʿAštart (𐤁𐤃𐤏𐤔𐤕𐤓𐤕), and ʿAbd-ʿAštart (𐤏𐤁𐤃𐤏𐤔𐤕𐤓𐤕), and her title of milkōt (𐤌𐤋𐤊𐤕, lit. 'Queen') being a theophoric element in the name of the 7th century BC Sidonian king ʿAbd-milkōt (𐤏𐤁𐤃𐤌𐤋𐤊𐤕, lit. 'Servant of the Queen').

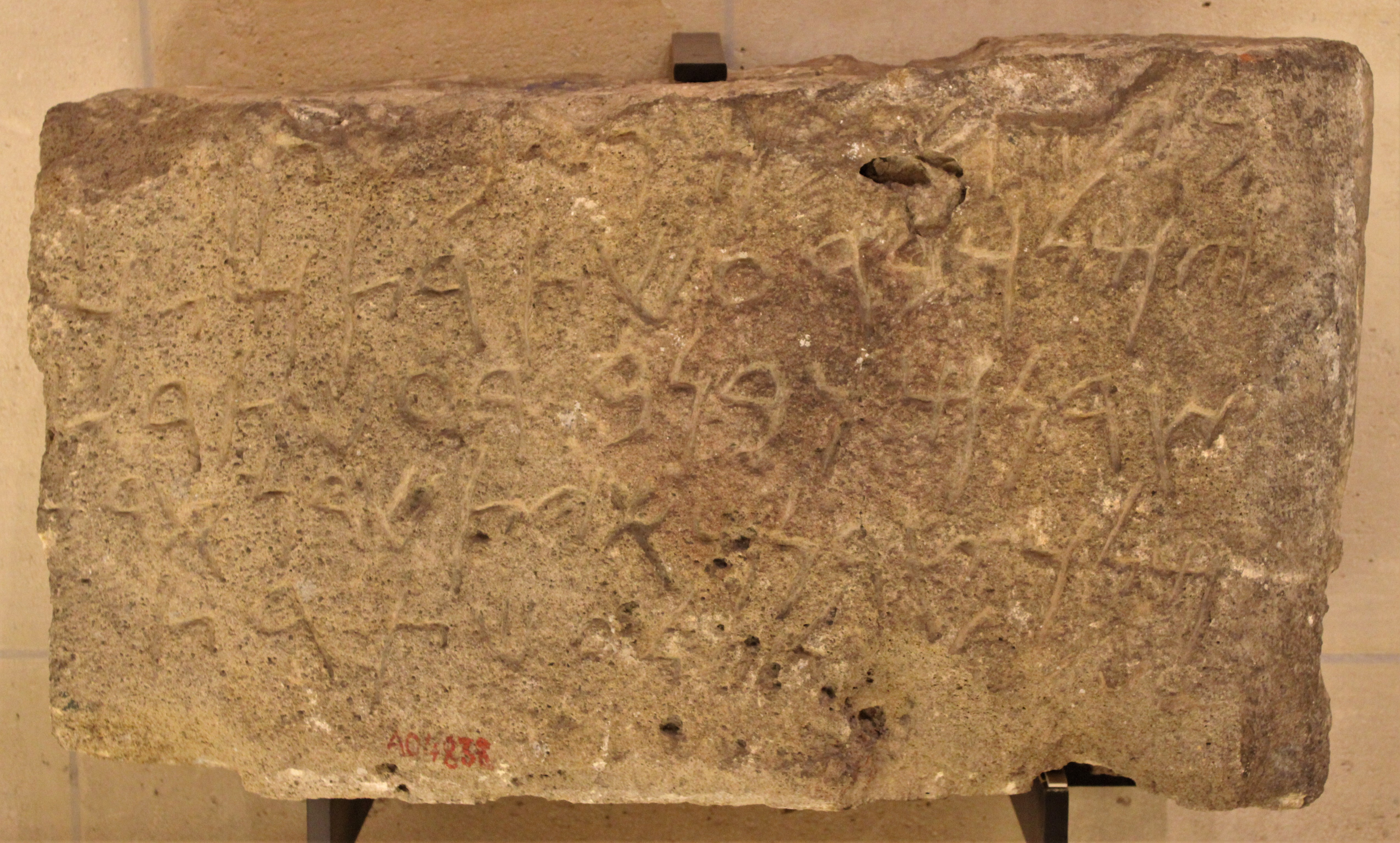
Inscription dedicated to the goddess ʿAštart by the Sidonian king Bodashtart

The kings of Ṣidōn from the 5th century BC, such as Eshmunazar I and his son Tabnit I, included "priest of ʿAštart" as part of their royal titulatory, and while Tabnit I's son, Eshmunazar II, who died when he was 14 years old, did not hold the title of "priest of ʿAštart," his mother Amoashtart was "priestess of ʿAštart." Before his death, Eshmunazar II and Amoashtart had built a sanctuary of ʿAštart at Ṣidōn ʾArṣ Yam (Sidon-Land-by-the-Sea), another sanctuary in the city's district of šmm ʾdrm (the Lofty Heavens), and a third sanctuary for ʿAštart šim Baʿl, with Eshmunazar II's cousin and successor Bodashtart having expanded the sanctuary of Ṣidōn ʾArṣ Yam.

As attested by three statuettes of children inscribed with dedications reading "to ʿAštart, to his Lord, to Eshmun" (𐤋𐤏𐤔𐤕𐤓𐤕 𐤋𐤀𐤃𐤍𐤉 𐤋𐤀𐤔𐤌𐤍, la-ʿAštart la-ʾadōniy la-ʾEšmūn), which mention ʿAštart along with Eshmun, the 6th to 4th century temple of this god at Bustān aš-Šayḫ where these statuettes were found was in fact a common sanctuary of Eshmun and ʿAštart. A large shrine to ʿAštart was located on the eastern side of the sanctuary, below the platform upon which the temple proper rested, and it contained a paved waterpool and a stone throne flanked with sphinxes dedicated to the Sidonian ʿAštart, which itself rested against the background wall, which was decorated with hunting scenes.

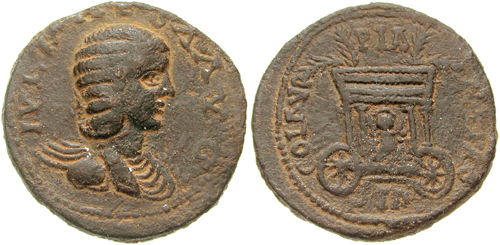
A Sidonian As of Julia Maesa, depicting "Car of Astarte", four palm branches protruding from roof

During the period of the middle Roman Empire, a Sidonian coin of the Roman empress Julia Cornelia Paula was issued bearing the image of ʿAštart resting her right arm on a cross-headed standard and holding a ship's stern in her left hand while crowned by the Roman goddess of victory, Victoria.

===== At Byblos =====
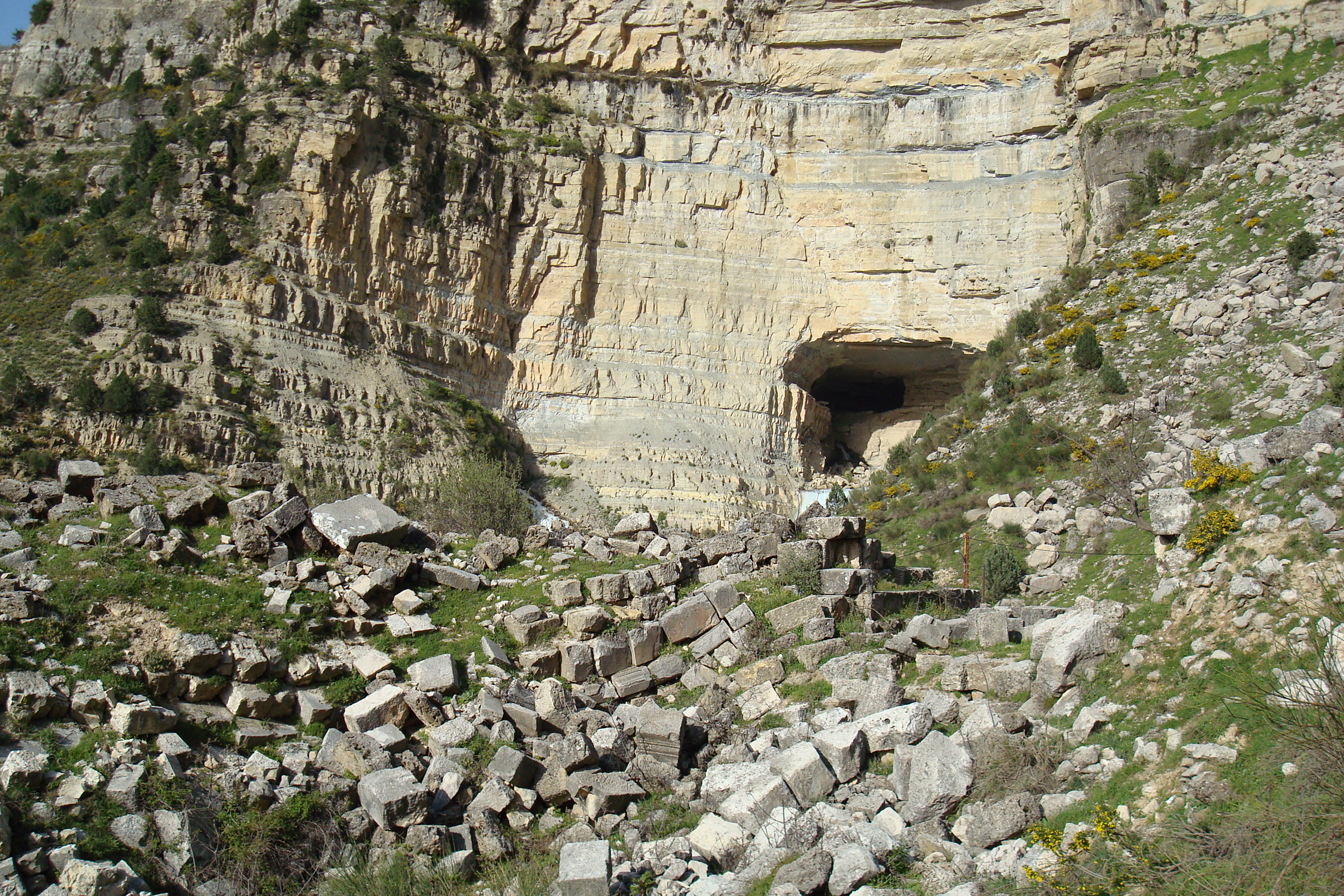
The remains of Astarte Temple and the Afqa grotto (source of Adonis River) in the background

The temple of ʿAštart at Afqa, in the territory of the city-state of Byblos, was one of the most renowned sanctuaries in ancient Phoenicia, located at the source of the Adonis river, where, according to Melito of Sardis, was the tomb of Adonis, whose blood turned the river's water red when he died there; according to Pseudo-Melito, this was the location of the tomb of Tammuz; and this temple was believed in ancient times to have been built by the legendary Cypriot king Cinyras, and it contained a waterpool, as well as pipelines which were used for lustrations linked to the cultic practises, and sacred prostitution, which was a typical part of the cult of ʿAštart, was also performed there.

ʿAštart of Afqa, who possessed erotic traits, was a goddess of the planet Venus as the Evening Star which brought together the sexes. This goddess later identified in Graeco-Roman times with the Greek goddess Aphrodite Urania (lit. 'the Celestial Aphrodite').

By the Hellenistic period, the goddess Baalat Gebal had become explicitly assimilated to ʿAštart, and therefore to the Greek Aphrodite), with whom ʿAštart was herself equated, at Byblos, as well as at Afqa.

According to Zosimus, a phenomenon would take place at site of the temple of Afqa whereby a bright and fiery star-like object would be shot up from the top of a Lebanese mountain and would fall into the Adonis river. Pilgrims would gather at the temple on days of this occurrence, and would throw precious objects, such as gold- and silverworks or linen or sea silk into the waterpool of the temple as offerings: the offerings which sunk into the water were believed to have been accepted by ʿAštart while the ones which floated were considered to have been rejected by the goddess.

The Roman emperor Constantine I ordered the destruction of the temple of Afqa, although Zosimus and Sozomen in the 5th century AD recorded that pilgrims still gathered at the site of the temple to make offerings on the days when the luminous phenomenon would occur. The temple building itself was permanently destroyed in an earthquake during the 6th century AD, although it remained a popular sacred site connected to fertility until recent times.

====== Tanit and ʿAštart ======
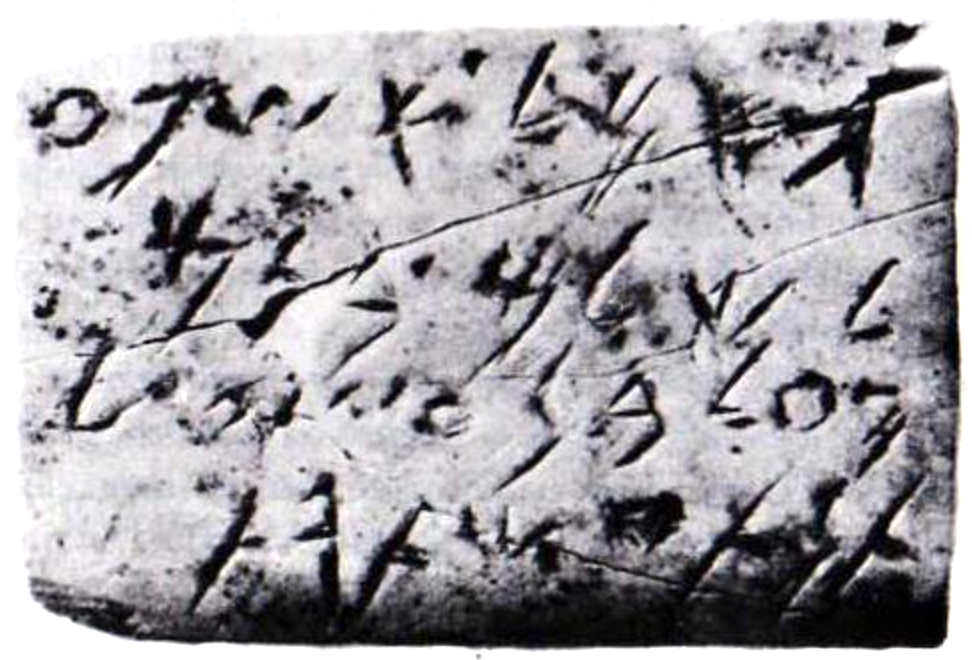
The inscription from Serepta mentioning Tanit-ʿAštart

Although the goddess Tanit, whose first attestation was from the city of Sarepta, has been argued to have been a hypostasis of ʿAštart in older scholarship, the two goddesses to have been nevertheless possibly distinguished from each other in inscriptions. However, the evidence for so is still ambiguous and the name Tinnit might itself have been a title which was attributed to multiple deities, including to ʿAštart. One inscription from Sarepta recording the dedication of a statue to Tinnit-ʿAštart (𐤕𐤍𐤕𐤏𐤔𐤕𐤓𐤕) nevertheless suggests some form of identification between Tanit and ʿAštart.

===== At Acre =====
ʿAštart held high importance in the religious structure of the city-state of Acre, where she was identified with the Greek goddess Aphrodite in Graeco-Roman times, when she was the patron-goddess of the city's public baths.

ʿAštart of Acre was depicted as Aphrodite on coins of the city from the 3rd century AD, where she was represented with a caduceus to her right, and the Greek god Eros, the son of Aphrodite, riding a dolphin to her left.

The goddess was however most often depicted on the coins of Acre under the traits of the Greek goddess Tyche in the latter's role as the patron goddess of a municipality, in which capacity she was represented as seated on a rock, wearing a crown made of crenellated towers, and placing one foot on the shoulder of a young swimmer who personnified the river Orontes, although the swimmer in the coins of Acre stood for the river-god Belus, that is the present-day Nahr al-Naʿāmayn, and he held a reed and leans over an amphora, with a crocodile beneath him.

Under the reign of the Roman Emperor Valerian, ʿAštart was depicted coins similarly to a Syrian goddess, with a calathus hat, and seated between two lions like Atargatis, with her right hand in a blessing position and her left one holding a flower.

===== At Tyre =====
The goddess ʿAštart held high prestige in the city-state of Tyre, where she was a dynastic goddess, as attested by the names of the 10th to 9th century BC Tyrian kings ʿAbd-ʿAštart (𐤏𐤁𐤃𐤏𐤔𐤕𐤓𐤕), Mattan-ʿAštart (𐤌𐤕𐤍𐤏𐤔𐤕𐤓𐤕), and ʿAštart-ʾImmī (𐤏𐤔𐤕𐤓𐤕𐤀𐤌); the king Hiram I allegedly built a new temple for ʿAštart and Melqart, and the later king Ithobaal II held the title of "priest of ʿAštart" before he ascended to the throne of Tyre.

At Tyre, ʿAštart was closely associated to the god Melqart and was his consort, a custom which was carried on by the colonists who set out from Tyre to establish themselves throughout the Mediterranean sea.

At the site of Ḫirbat aṭ-Ṭayibā, to the south of Tyre, a stone "throne of Astarte" with an inscription (KAI 17) was dedicated to ʿAštart in a sacred site located in the middle of the fields of the one who offered the dedication.

In the Tyrian town of Ḥamon, ʿAštart formed a triad with the god Milk-ʿAštart and the Angel of Milk-ʿAštart, and the city's sanctuary of Milk-ʿAštart contained a dedication to ʿAštart.

In the 7th century BC, the warrior goddess role of ʿAštart was invoked in the treaty between the Assyrian king Esarhaddon and the Tyrian king Baal I in a line reading "May ʿAštart break your bow in the thick of battle, and have you crouch at the feet of your enemy" (𒀭𒊍𒋻𒌓 𒀸 𒋫𒄩𒍣 𒆗𒉌 𒄑𒉼𒆪𒉡 𒇷𒅖𒄵 𒀸 𒉺𒅁𒆷𒉽𒆪𒉡 𒀸 𒇷𒊺𒅆𒅁𒆪𒉡, ᴰAstartu ina tāḫāzi danni qaštakunu lišbir ina šapla nakrikunu lišēšibkunu). This description of ʿAštart paralleled that of the Mesopotamian Ishtar, who was given the title of "Lady of Battle and War" (𒁁𒀖 𒉠 𒌋 𒀞, belet qabli u tāhāzi).

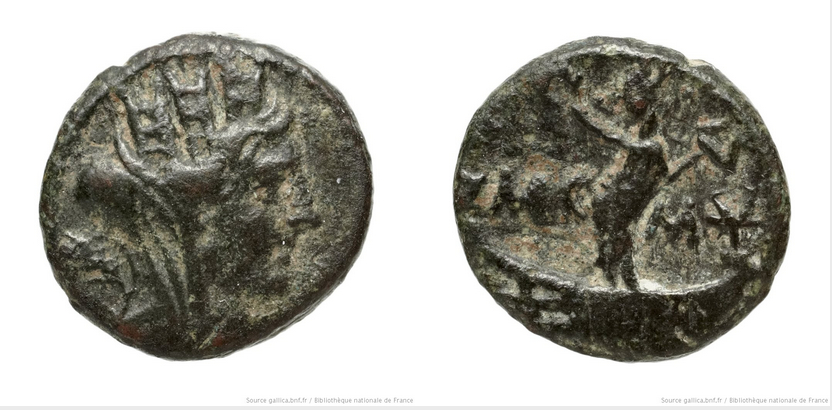
A Bronze coin from Tyre from the time of Hadrian, depicting Tyche (left) and Astarte on a galley holding a crown in her right hand and a scepter in her left hand (right)

The association between ʿAštart and Melqart at Tyre continued until the Roman period, and an inscription from the Severan dynasty mentions the goddess ʿAštart, under the name of the Greek goddess Leucothea, along with Melqart, under the name of Heracles.

====== Astronoē ======
ʿAštart was sometimes worshipped at Tyre under the name of ʿAštārōniy (𐤏𐤔𐤕𐤓𐤍𐤉), which was a form of her name where the feminine suffix -t had been replaced by the adjectival suffix -ōniy (𐤍𐤉-).

According to the 6th century AD Neoplatonist scholarch Damascius, ʿAštārōniy was the "mother of the gods", and had fallen in love with a young hunter, Eshmun of Berytus, who castrated himself to escape her, but whom the goddess resurrected.

The name of ʿAštārōniy was given to a Tyrian port, and she was mentioned in a Tyrian inscription from the 1st century AD after "Hercules", that is Melqart. The name ʿAštārōniy is also recorded from Rhodes in the eastern Mediterranean, and from Carthage in the western Mediterranean.

===== In Egypt =====
Due to the influence of the Egyptian Osiris myth, the Phoenicians who lived in Egypt during the Hellenistic period continued the identification of ʿAštart with Isis, in which capacity they worshipped this latter goddess.

===== In Cyprus =====
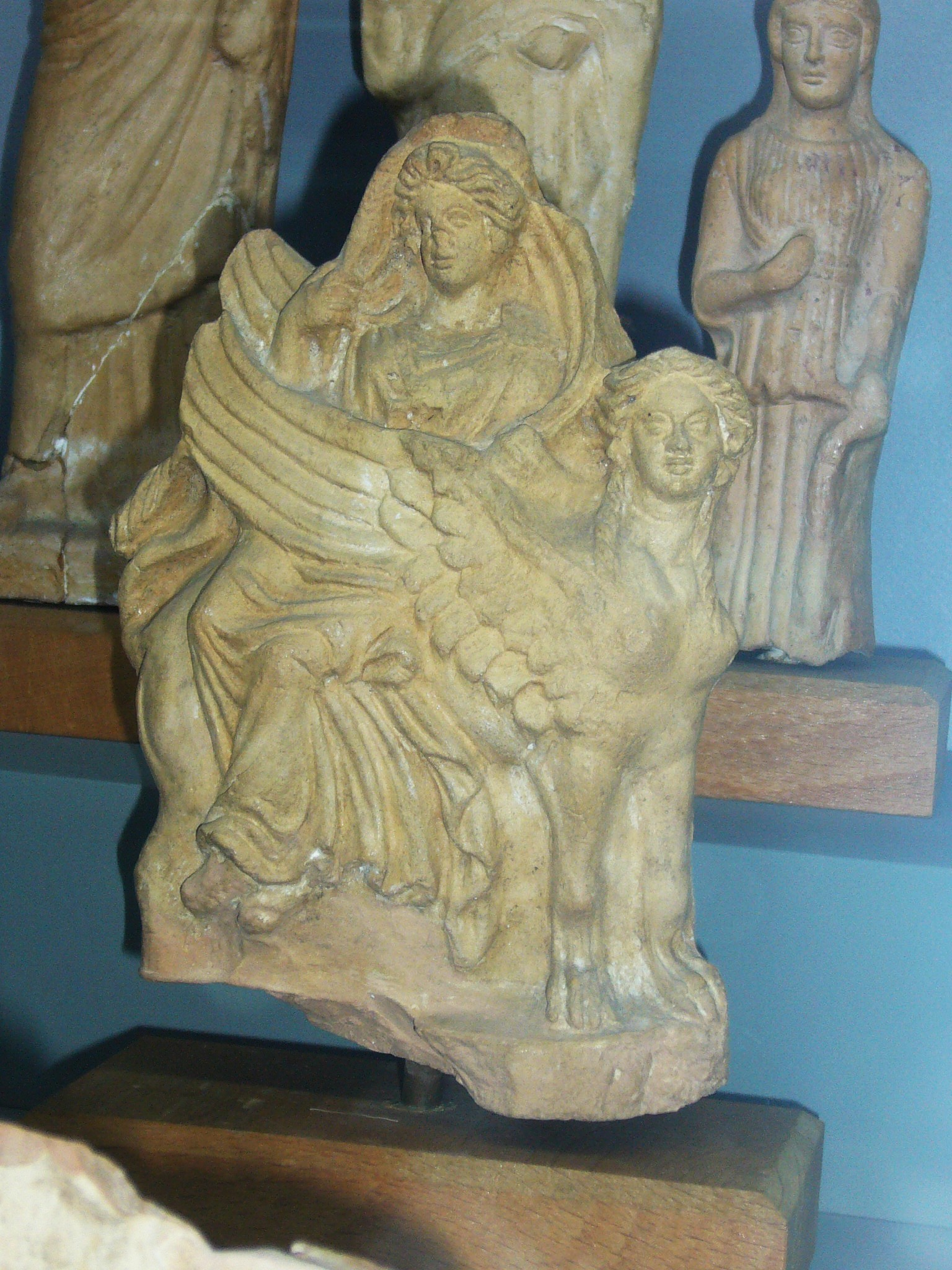
Figurine of Astarte from Cyprus, Cyprus Museum in Nicosia.

The worship of ʿAštart is widely attested in ancient Cyprus, where she had been assimilated to the Greek goddess Aphrodite from early times, due to which many early shrines of Aphrodite in Cyprus showed partial Phoenician influence.

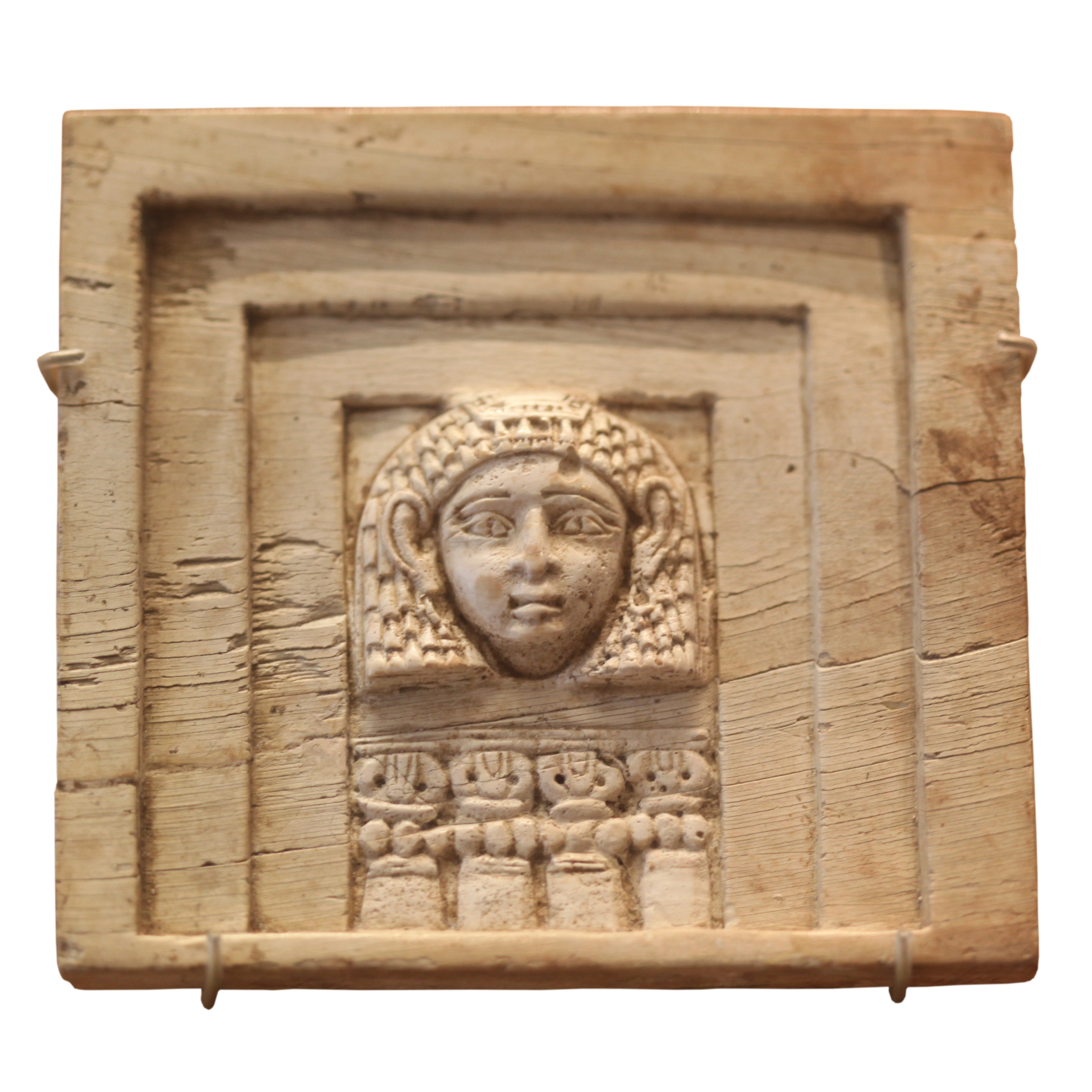
The "woman at the window" on an ivory plaque from Arslan Tash

The Cypriot ʿAštart was already depicted in Phoenician ivory sculptures and in the Book of Proverbs (7) of the Bible, and was likely referred by the Greeks as "the Peeper" (Παρακύπτουσα, Parakúptousa) and by the Romans as the Venus prōspiciēns of Salamis.

====== At Kition ======
A shrine of ʿAštart stood at the Bamboula site in ancient Kition, which has yielded a 4th-century BC alabaster tablet on which were recorded the expenses of the shrine over the course of a whole month as well as a mention of ʿAštart by her common title of "Holy Queen" (𐤌𐤋𐤊𐤕 𐤒𐤃𐤔𐤕, milkōt qdšt).

The inhabitants of the Kition identified ʿAštart with the Greek goddess Aphrodite Urania.

Under the rule of the kingdom of Kition, a big Phoenician archive was installed in Idalion; most of the archive is economic, but some of it is religious, and one of the ostraca records ʿAštart and Melqart in a Merzeah.

====== At Paphos ======
In Cyprus, ʿAštart was identified during the 3rd century BC with the Greek goddess Aphrodite Paphia (lit. 'Aphrodite of Paphos'), who was worshipped at Palaepaphos, as recorded by a dedicatory inscription to ʿštrt pp (𐤏𐤔𐤕𐤓𐤕 𐤐𐤐, lit. 'ʿAštart of Paphos').

====== At Amathous ======
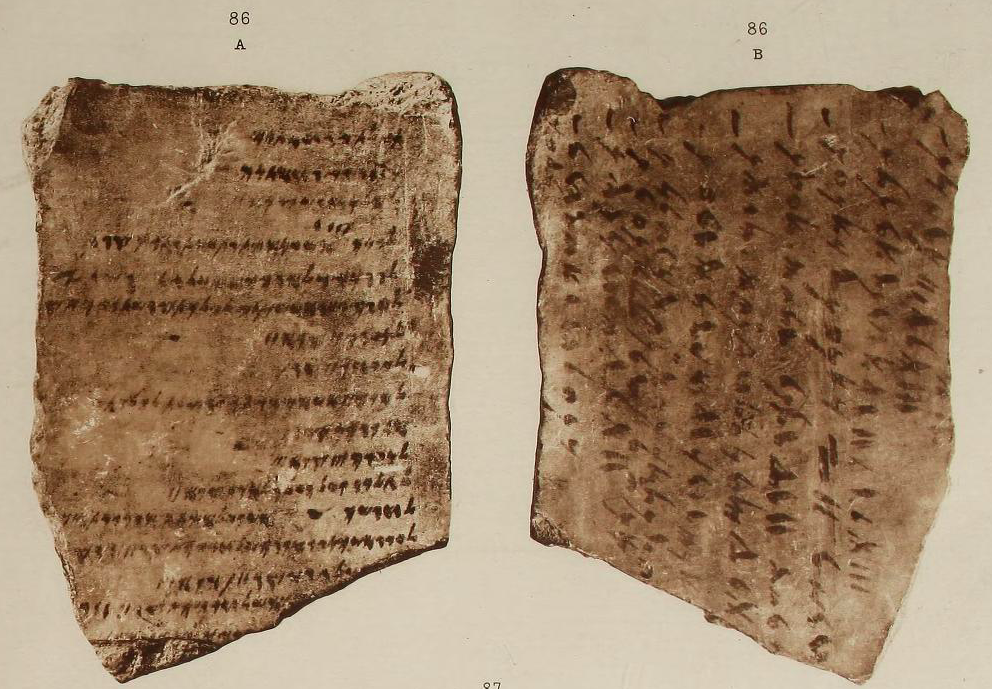
One of Kition Tariffs, which deals with the expenses of the temple of Astarte in Kition by month

The goddess ʿAštart was the main deity of the city of Amathous, where stood one of the most famous temples of hers at the top of the acropolis of the city. The temple of ʿAštart of Amathous was erected in the 8th century BC, when the city was under Tyrian influence, with the presence of two Phoenician graffiti and Phoenician-type anthropoid sarcophagi at Amathous and Kition attesting of the existence of a Phoenician community living in these cities. The shrine of Amathous, like most Cypriot shrines of ʿAštart, thus exhibited partial Phoenician influences, such as worship halls, courtyards, and altars within a temenos, and it was only in the 1st century AD that it was replaced by a Greek-style temple. During the 6th and 5th centuries BC, local hand-made votive figurines were associated to Phoenician-type small moulded plates depicting ʿAštart as a naked standing goddess holding her breasts, as well as to small Greek-type korai.

Two dedications offered by Androcles, the last king of Amathous, some time between 330 and 310 BC, respectively to the goddesses Kupris (lit. 'the Goddess of Cyprus') and Kupria Aphrodite (lit. 'the Aphrodite of Cyprus'), as well as two monumental limestone vases have been found at the site of the shrine of Amathous.

Although Graeco-Roman authors had claimed that it was forbidden to spill blood in the temple of Amathous, remains of Hellenistic sacrifices provided evidence that goats and sheep were the main animals offered in sacrifice at the shrine ʿAštart.

According to the Roman authors Ovid, Pausanias, and Tacitus, the inhabitants of Cyprus considered the shrine of Venus, that is, ʿAštart, at Amathous as one of the three most reverend sites on Cyprus, along with Paphos and Salamis.

===== In the Aegean Sea and Greece =====
The name of the goddess ʿAštart was used as a theophoric element in several personal names, attested at Athens, Aphrodisias, Delos, and Rhodes, in their Hellenised forms and including the element Strat- (Στρατ-, from ʿAštart).

====== In Rhodes ======
At Rhodes (in KAI 44, one of the Rhodes Phoenician-Greek bilingual inscriptions), the full title of one of the temple attendants who participated of the cult of Melqart, the miqim ʾelīm, bore the title of mtrḥ ʿštrny (𐤌𐤕𐤓𐤇 𐤏𐤔𐤕𐤓𐤍𐤉), possibly meaning "ʿAštartean husband".

====== At Delos ======
A Sidonian woman is recorded as having honoured ʿAštart, assimilated to the Egyptian Isis, in the official Serapeum of Delos.

====== At Kos ======
At Kos, a Phoenician thiasote took ʿAštart and Zeus Soter (that is, Baal Mahalāk, lit. 'Baal of the Crossings (of the Sea)') as his patron deities, and a son of the Sidonian king Abdalonymus dedicated a piece of maritime art to the goddess ʿAštart-Aphrodite for the life of the sailors (KAI 292).

===== In Malta =====
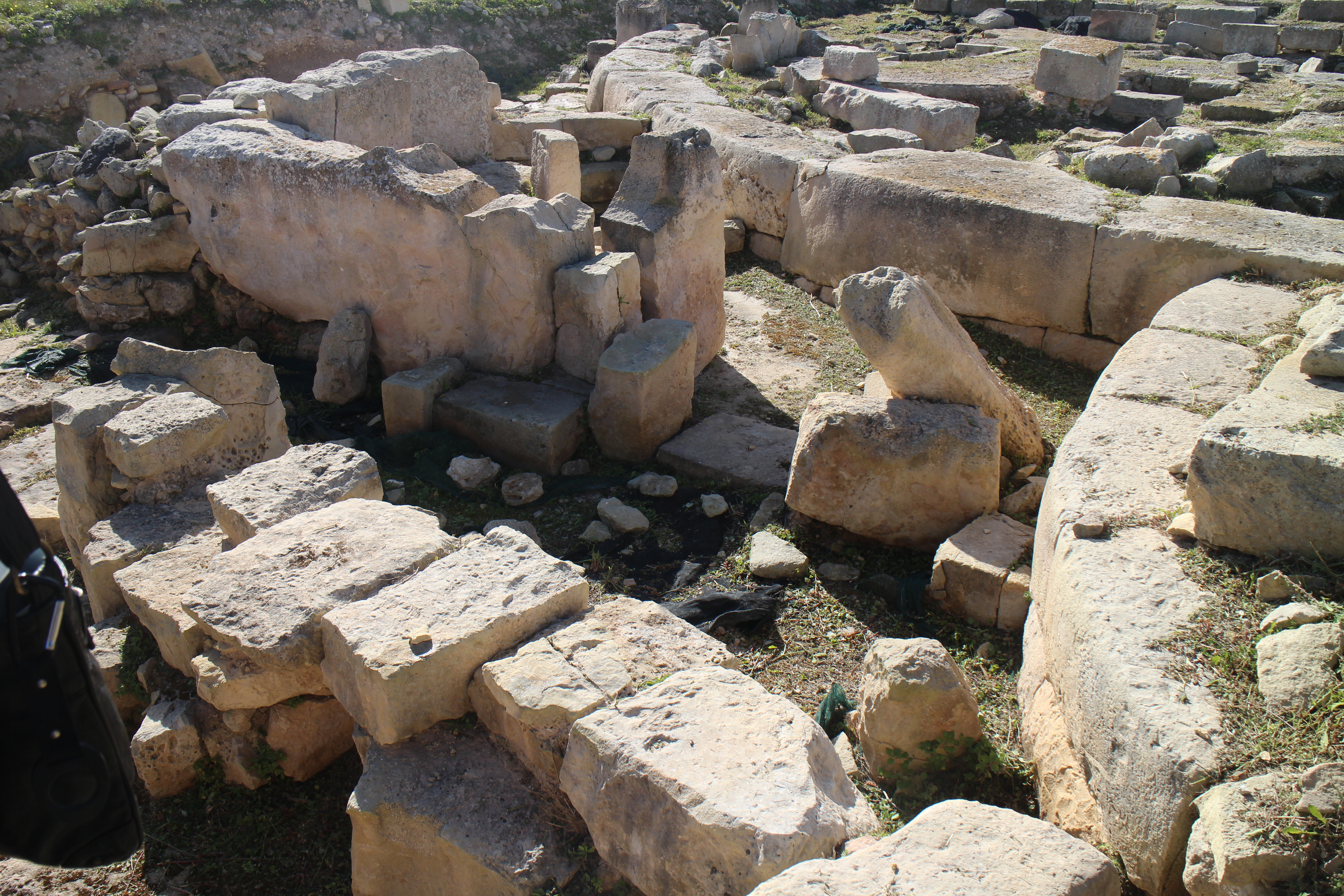
The remains of a megalithic temple in Tas-Silġ, which later became a temple of Astarte

In the late 8th century BC, Phoenicians repurposed an old Copper Age megalithic structure at Tas-Silġ on the island of Malta into a temple of ʿAštart where offerings were given to her by readjusting its walls, placing their altar on an older altar stone, building several shrines, and placing there large numbers of votive gifts, especially Hellenistic-style statues.

The sanctuary of ʿAštart at Tas-Silg was of large dimensions, being 100 metres wide, and was renowned in antiquity for its great wealth. The Tas-Silġ temple has yielded many Punic inscriptions dating from the 5th to 1st centuries BC containing short dedications to ʿAštart, who was there identified with the Greek supreme goddess Hera and later with the Italic Juno, due to which Cicero later referred to it as the fānum Iūnōnis, "the temple of Juno".

A temple of ʿAštart also existed on the island of Gozo.

===== In Sicily =====
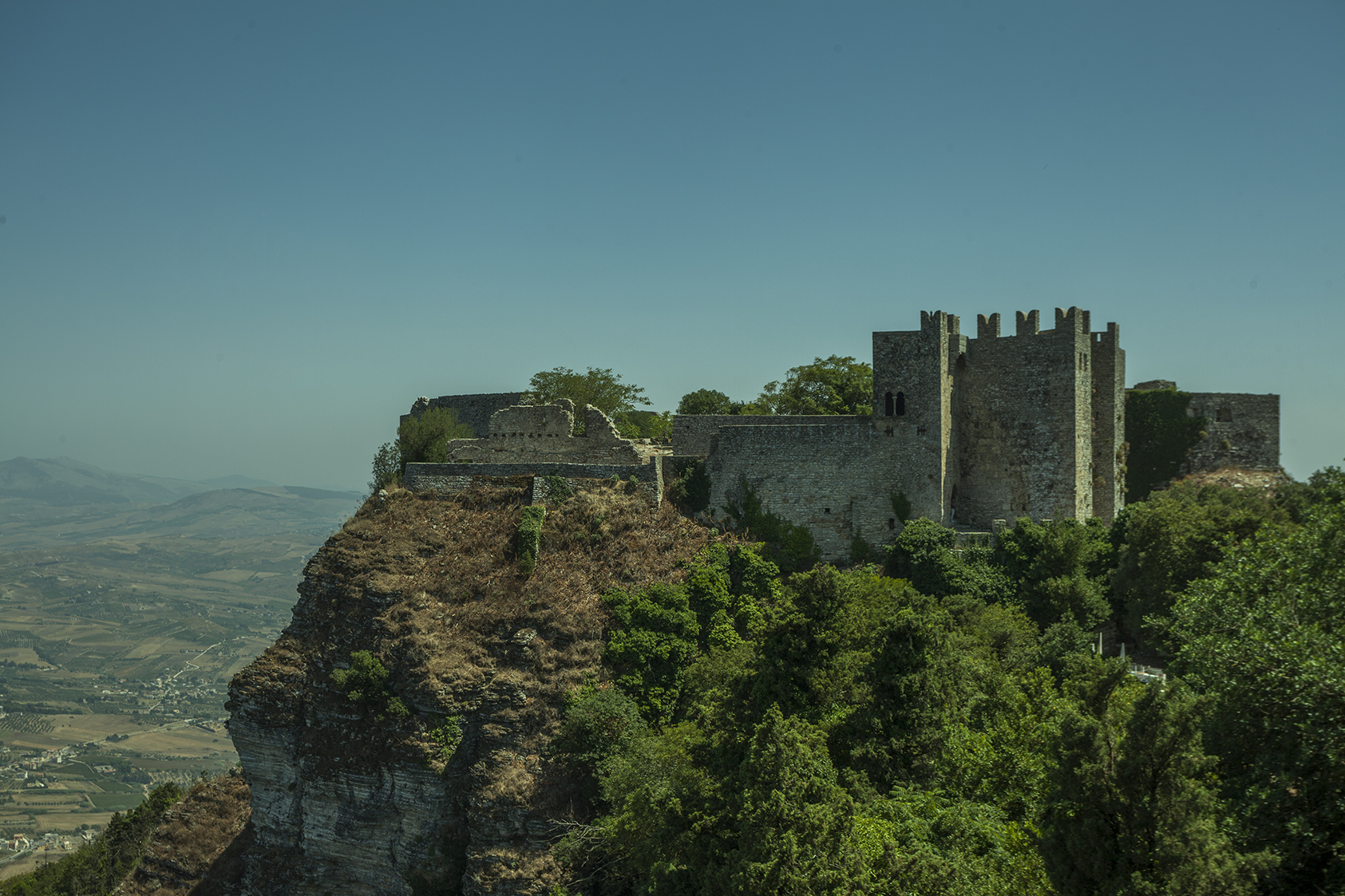
The remains of the castle which was built on ʿštrt ʾrk/Venus Erycina temple

ʿAštart worshipped in Sicily at the Mount Eryx, where stood a temple a goddess, on a rocky outcrop which domonates from its north-east the city of Eryx, which itself was a town which had once belonged to the Elymians and was an ally of the Phoenicians settled at Ṣiṣ and Moṭwē before becoming a Punic fort during the 4th to 3rd century BC. The temple of Mount Eryx was initially dedicated to an indigenous goddess named in Oscan inscriptions as Herentas Herukina (𐌇𐌄𐌓𐌄𐌍𐌕𐌀𐌔 𐌇𐌄𐌓𐌖𐌊𐌉𐌍𐌀), who was later identified with ʿAštart, and later to the Greek Aphrodite and the Roman Venus Erycina.

The Romans themselves called the temple of Mount Eryx the Veneris fānum (lit. 'temple of Venus'), and according to a Roman coin from the 1st century BC, it had four columns, the mountain itself was surrounded by a wall, so that the shrine could only reached by passing through a monumental gate. Claudius Aelianus recounted a legend, according to which the Veneris fānum possessed an open-air altar from which all the sacrifices offered to the goddess during the day would disappear during the night and would be replaced with dew and fresh herbs, which was similar to some characteristics of the cult of the Cypriot ʿAštart.

Older coins depicted the goddess of Eryx with a dove, which was an attribute of the Levantine ʿAštart, as well as with the Greek Erōs, the son of Aphrodite, and a dog, which was commonly found within Phoenician religion and thus showed the presence of West Asian influences on her. Later coins represent her wearing a laurel wreath and a diadem.

Another typically Levantine aspect of the cult of the ʿAštart of Eryx was the practise of sacred prostitution, which was carried out by the "servants" of the goddess. Sacred prostitution at the Veneris fānum was well known enough in antiquity that Plautus recorded an old man's advice to a pimp in which he mentioned that courtesans at the shrine would earn large amounts of money.

The worship of this goddess later spread to the Graeco-Roman world, where her worship is attested at Rome, Herculaneum, Dikaiarkhia, Potentia, and Greece. In the Punic world, she was worshipped at Karalis, in Sardinia, at Carthage, where two inscriptions refer to the ʿAštart of Eryx, as well as at Thibilis, Cirta, Madaure, and Sicca Veneria, which was well known in ancient times for its practise of sacred prostitution, which was performed there by the Pūnicae fēminae (lit. 'Carthaginian women').

===== In Carthage =====
In Carthage and in Phoenico-Punic Africa in general, the goddess Tanit appears to have displaced ʿAštart and taken over her roles, due to which she became called "Tanit-Face-of-Baal" (𐤕𐤍𐤕 𐤐𐤍 𐤁𐤏𐤋, Tinnit panē Baʿl), who was often paired with the supreme Carthaginian god Baal Hammon.

Although the goddess ʿAštart held lesser importance in North Africa, she was worshipped at Carthage, where her cult was imported directly from Phoenicia, especially from Tyre and Ṣidōn, as well as from Eryx.

A 7th century BC golden medallion from Carthage mentioned the goddess ʿAštart alongside an individual named Pygmalion to whom the medallion belonged.

During the Punic period, ʿAštart was connected to the worship of Eshmun, as she was in the Sidonian temple at Bustān aš-Šayḫ, and she was herself worshipped under the name of "Mighty ʿAštart" (𐤏𐤔𐤕𐤓𐤕 𐤄𐤀𐤃𐤓𐤕, ʿAštart ha-ʾaddīrōt). ʿAštart, like Tanit, possessed a temple of her own in the city of Carthage, which was located in the city's centre. It was likely the warrior form of the goddess who was worshipped in this temple, since her weapons and chariot were kept there.

The Punic general Hannibal invoked ʿAštart, referring to her in Greek as Hera, as one of the many deities he took as witness in the treaty he concluded with the king Philip V of Macedon.

During the 3rd to 2nd centuries BC, a temple to the Egyptian goddess Isis, identified to ʿAštart, existed at Carthage.

Following the destruction of Carthage and its annexation by the Roman Republic at the end of the Punic Wars, the Romans continued the worship of ʿAštart under the name of the "Celestial Juno" (Iūnō Caelestis), and when they rebuilt Carthage in 123 BC, they initially named it Junonia after Iūnō Caelestis, that is, after ʿAštart. The Romans also rebuilt the temple of ʿAštart and dedicated it to Juno Caelestis, who was thus a Roman continuation of the initial Punic cult of ʿAštart, and a distinct goddess from the native Roman Juno Regina. During the Roman period, ʿAštart was still worshipped under her Phoenician name at Thuburbo Maius, where she was identified with Juno Caelestis.

The identification of ʿAštart with the Egyptian Isis continued in the formerly Punic territories of North Africa after the Roman conquest, and several Isea existed in the region under Roman rule.

Roman writers mentioned that Africans worshipped the "Carthaginian Juno" (Iūnō Poena), who arrived from the East and whose favourite place to stay was Carthage; Tertullian in the 2nd century AD noted the parallels between the African Caelestis and the Levantine ʿAštart; Herodian in the 2nd to 3rd century AD mentioned a goddess Ourania (lit. 'the Celestial One'), who was worshipped by the Carthaginians and the Libyans, and whose name he recorded as "Queen of the Stars" (Ancient Greek: Ἀστροάρχη, romanized: Astroárkhē), which was both a deformation and reinterpretation of the name of ʿAštart; and Augustine of Hippo recorded that Punic people called Juno "Astarte", that is ʿAštart.

The worship of ʿAštart-Caelestis held an exceptional importance at Mididi, where she was called by her Phoenician-Punic name, and was called the "wife of Baal", as recorded in a neo-Punic inscription reading "Sanctuary for ʿAštart consort of Baal: the citizens of Mididi built (it)" (𐤌𐤒𐤃𐤔 𐤁𐤍𐤀 𐤋𐤏𐤔𐤕𐤓𐤕 𐤔𐤕 𐤁𐤏𐤋 𐤁𐤍𐤀 𐤁𐤏𐤋𐤀 𐤄𐤌𐤉𐤃𐤃𐤌, mqdš bnʾ lʿštrt št Bʿl bnʾ bʿlʾ hMyddm). Attesting of her primacy at Mididi was a stela discovered there, with the goddess being depicted on its pediment, while on its lower level was the African Saturn (that is, Baal Hammon), to whose right was the goddess Kubeleya seated on her lion, who was herself identified at Mididi with ʿAštart, and not with Tanit.

The Roman temple of Juno Caelestis, according to the 5th century AD Bishop of Carthage, Quodvultdeus, was of large proportions, and was surrounded by shrines to various deities associated to the goddess, and the 5th century AD Bishop of Byzacena, Victor Vitensis, described it as being located near the Baths of Antoninus; the temple had already been desecrated under the reign of the Roman emperor Theodosius I, and it was finally destroyed in 421 AD following unrest by the pagan population of the city.

===== In Italy =====
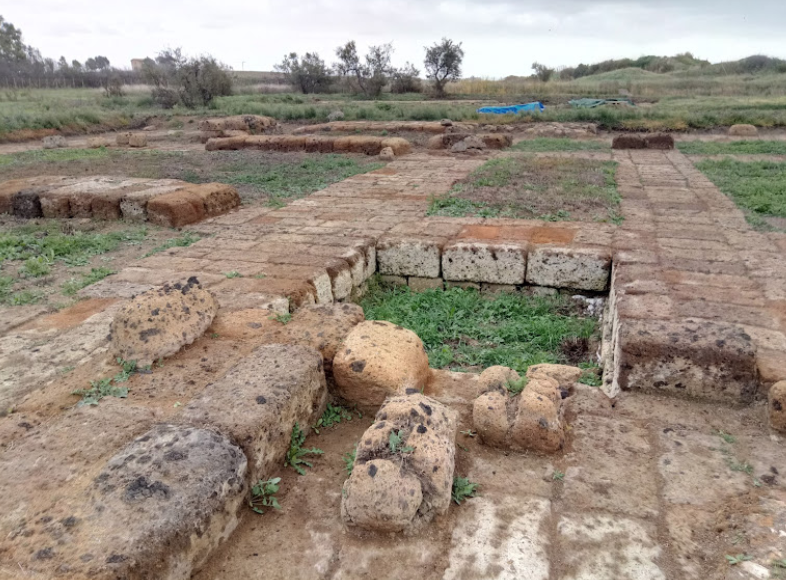
A view in the sanctuary in Pyrgi, which included a temple to Astarte (as mentioned in the Pyrgi Tablets)

The Etruscans identified ʿAštart with their own goddess Uni, as attested by the gold tablets discovered in 1964 at the site of renowned sanctuary built in the 6th century BC to the goddess Uni in the town of Pyrgi, the port of the Etruscan city-state of Cisra. Uni was associated to the god Tinia, who was the Etruscan equivalent of the Greek Zeus and was assimilated to Melqart, with the divine couple of Uni and Tinia being thus assimilated to the Phoenician-Punic divine couple of ʿAštart and Melqart.

The gold tablets from the Pyrgi renowned were engraved with Etruscan and Phoenician-Punic inscriptions recording the dedication of a cult centre to ʿAštart by the king Tiberius Velianas of Cisra, who ruled around c. 500 BC, on "the day of the burial of the god (Melqart)." The practise of this cult to the Phoenician-Punic by an Etruscan king might have been the result of a possible treaty with Carthage, and the rites practised at the shrine of Pyrgi included sacred prostitution, performed by the "scorta Pyrgensia", the prostitutes of Pyrgi.

The shrine of Pyrgi was a wealthy one, as evidenced by the 1500 talents which Dionysius I of Syracuse looted from it in 384 BC.

===== In Hispania =====
As attested by the Seville/El Carambolo Statuette, imported from the Levant to Hispania, the Phoenician activities in the Mediterranean had spread the cult of ʿAštart till Hispania.

The worship of ʿAštart also continued in Hispania after it was conquered by the Romans, with the goddess being there also called Juno, and the existence of a temple and an altar to "Juno," that is to ʿAštart, is mentioned by Artemidorus and Pomponius Mela. One Latin inscription from the Roman imperial period refers to a priest named Herculis whose father was named Junonis, reflecting the Punic association of "Hercules" (Melqart) and "Juno" (ʿAštart).

The "Islands of Hera," or "Islands of Juno," located in the Strait of Gibraltar, as well as the island of Junonia in the Atlantic Ocean and the "Cape of Hera" or "Cape of Juna" (presently Cape Trafalgar), also owed their names to ʿAštart.

===== In Britannia =====
Under the Roman Empire, the cult of ʿAštart had spread till the foot of Hadrian's Wall in Britannia, where she was invoked using her Phoenician name and associated to the "Tyrian Hercules," that is to Melqart, thus being a continuation of the close connection between Melqart and ʿAštart, and attesting of the Phoenician origin of this cult.

==== Rituals ====
A typically Levantine aspect of the cult of ʿAštart was the practise of sacred prostitution, which was performed by specific categories of her temples' clergy who were exercised this function on a permanent basis. The different categories of sacred prostitutes were the:

- "nubile girls" (𐤏𐤋𐤌𐤕, ʿlmt), who were sometimes simply called "servants of ʿAštart" (𐤀𐤌𐤕 𐤔 𐤏𐤔𐤕𐤓𐤕, ʾmt š ʿAštart);
- "dogs" (𐤊𐤋𐤁𐤌, klbm), who were male sacred prostitutes who engaged in homosexual intercourse;
- "young men" or "whelps" (𐤂𐤓𐤌, grm), who were later called "servants of the Temple of ʿAštart" (𐤏𐤁𐤃 𐤁𐤕 𐤏𐤔𐤕𐤓𐤕, ʿbd bt ʿAštart).

The practise of sacred prostitution is attested at the temple of ʿAštart in Byblos, and sacred prostitutes and "whelps" are recorded at the temples of ʿAštart at Afqa and Baalbek until the 4th century AD. The practise is also recorded in Cyprus, especially at Paphos, Amathous, and Kition, and in Sicily, at Eryx, from where two sacred prostitutes of Carthaginian origin are known by name: ʾArišut-Baʿl (𐤀𐤓𐤔𐤕𐤁𐤏𐤋, lit. 'Desired object of Baal') and her daughter ʾAmot-Milqart (𐤀𐤌𐤕𐤌𐤋𐤒𐤓𐤕, lit. 'Servant of Milqart').

Sacred prostitution in the honour of ʿAštart was also practised at Carthage, as well as at Sicca Veneria, which was renowned for its sacred prostitution rituals, and sacred prostitution might have also been performed at some brothels.

The Phoenician imagery of "the woman at the window", as well as the "Peeper" of Cyprus, the Venus prōspiciēns of Salamis, as well as the El Carambolo statuette depicting a naked ʿAštart and some specific feminine images were semantically connected to sacred prostitution performed in the honour of ʿAštart.

===== Legacy =====
Other ancient Mediterranean peoples considered ʿAštart to be the supreme goddess of the Phoenicians, due to which several of them identified her with their own supreme goddess, with the Greeks identifying her with Hera, the Etruscans with Uni, and the Romans with (Juno.

The Graeco-Romans Hellenised the name of ʿAštart as Astartē (Ἀστάρτη), which they in turn Latinized as "Astarte", and identified her with their own goddesses Aphrodite and Venus, due to her erotic aspect.

In the writings of the 1st century AD Roman poet Virgil, the goddess Venus mentioned the Cypriot shrine of ʿAštart at Amathous among her most famous temples.

The name ʿAštart's variant of ʿAštārōniy was Hellenised as Astronoē (Ἀστρονόη) under the influence of the Greek term astron (ἄστρον, lit. 'constellation'.

==== In the Levant ====
The goddess ʿAštart (𐤏𐤔𐤕𐤓𐤕) appears to have disappeared from most of inland Palestine during the Iron Age due to the ruling classes of the states in the region no longer identifying with the practise of hunting, so that her cult became restricted to the coastal areas such as in Philistia, where it enjoyed high prestige until the Graeco-Roman period. An Ascalonian named Philostratos, son of Philostratos, dedicated an altar on the Greek Island of Delos to "Astarte the Palestinian Aphrodite", his city and family.

One ceramic box from the 9th century discovered at the site of Tel Rehov was topped with a leonine figure, suggesting it was the emblematic animal of ʿAṯtart/ʿAštart, with an open mouth and dangling tongue lying in a prone position with its front limbs outstretched and of its paws placed, claws extended, each over a human head. Below the animal is a large opening which either was modelled on the entrance of a shrine or was intended to be a receptacle for a divine image: the leonine animal, who was depicted as imposing its power against the human figures, might have guarded the shrine against human intrusion, and might thus have represented the passage recorded earlier in Ugaritic texts as "May she (ʿAṯtart) shut the jaw of El's attackers" (𐎚𐎕𐎔𐎖𐎟𐎍𐎈𐎚𐎟𐎄𐎟𐎂𐎗𐎟𐎛𐎍, taṣpiq laḥata dā gūri ʾIli).

===== In Israel and Judah =====
Following the trend of the disappearance of the worship of ʿAštart in inland Palestine, the state-level cult of this goddess was absent from Israelite and Judahite records from an early date, and she seems to have become one of many former gods demoted to the status of entities and powers of blessing under the control of the Israelite national god Yahweh. As such the plural form of ʿAštart's name, ʿAštārōṯ (עַשְׁתָּרוֹת), became used as a term for goddesses and for fertility, while her role as a deity of warfare was absorbed by Yahweh.

The worship of ʿAštart might nevertheless have survived as a minor and popular, but not royal, cult among the Israelite population, with the practice of hunting for undomesticated animals (to be sacrificed) being restricted to the family and local shrines; but not at the state level. The influence of the Neo-Assyrian Ishtar later increased the influence of this cult within the Israelite religion, so that the Ishtar-influenced Israelite ʿAštart might have been the same goddess referred to as the Queen of Heaven (מְלֶכֶת הַשָּׁמַיִם, Məleḵeṯ haš-Šāmayīm) by the Judahite prophet Jeremiah.

The Bible claims that the Israelite king Solomon introduced the worship of the Phoenician ʿAštart in his kingdom, although it is uncertain whether this claim rests on any historical basis or whether it was made retroactively as a reaction against Phoenician religious imports. The cult of the Phoenician ʿAštart appears to have nevertheless enjoyed some level of royal support during the later periods of the Israelite kingdom.

===== In Transjordan =====
Although an Ammonite seal dedicated to ʿAštart in Sidon (𐤏𐤔𐤕𐤓𐤕 𐤁𐤑𐤃𐤍, ʿAštart bi-Ṣidōn) was found in Sidon, she appears to have been absent from Ammon itself.

Like in Israel and Ammon, there is no evidence of any cult of ʿAštart in Moab or Edom.

===== In Philistia =====
The Hebrew Bible records that the Philistines displayed the armour of the dead Israelite king Saul in their temple of "Ashteroth", due to her role as a goddess of war and as the consort of Baal.

The inhabitants of the Philistine city-state of Ascalon worshipped ʿAštart and identified her with the Greek goddess Aphrodite Urania.

=== Later interpretations of biblical Astaroth ===
In some kabbalistic texts and in medieval and renaissance occultism (ex. The Book of Abramelin), the name Astaroth was assigned to a male demon bearing little resemblance to the figure known from antiquity. For the use of the Hebrew plural form ʿAštārōṯ in this sense, see Astaroth.

== Myths ==
=== At Ugarit ===
In the Baʿal Epic of Ugarit, ʿAṯtartu is one of the allies of the eponymous hero. With the help of Anat she stops him from attacking the messengers who deliver the demands of Yam and later assists him in the battle against the sea god, possibly "exhorting him to complete the task" during it. It's a matter of academic debate if they were also viewed as consorts. Their close relation is highlighted by the epithet "face of Baal" or "of the name of Baal."

A different narrative, so-called "Myth of Astarte the huntress" casts ʿAṯtartu herself as the protagonist, and seemingly deals both with her role as a goddess of the hunt stalking game in the steppe, and with her possible relationship with Baal.

==== ʿAṯtartu and Anat ====
Fragmentary narratives describe ʿAṯtartu and Anat hunting together. They were frequently treated as a pair in cult. For example, an incantation against snakebite invokes them together in a list of gods who asked for help. Texts from Emar, which are mostly of ritual nature unlike narrative ones known from Ugarit, indicate that ʿAṯtartu was a prominent deity in that city as well, and unlike in Ugarit, she additionally played a much bigger role in cult followings than Anat.

==== Misconceptions in scholarship ====
While the association between ʿAṯtartu and Anat is well attested, primary sources from Ugarit and elsewhere provide no evidence in support of the misconception that Athirat (Asherah) and ʿAṯtartu were ever conflated, let alone that Athirat was ever viewed as Baal's consort like ʿAṯtartu possibly was. Scholar of Ugaritic mythology and the Bible Steve A. Wiggins in his monograph A Reassessment of Asherah: With Further Considerations of the Goddess notes that such arguments rest on scarce biblical evidence (which indicates at best a confusion between obscure terms in the Book of Judges rather than between unrelated deities in Canaanite or Bronze Age Ugaritic religion) sums up the issue with such claims: "(...) Athtart begins with an ayin, and Athirat with an aleph. (...) Athtart appears in parallel with Anat in texts (...), but Athirat and Athtart do not occur in parallel." God lists from Ugarit indicate that ʿAṯtartu was viewed as analogous to Mesopotamian Ishtar and Hurrian Išḫara, but not Athirat.

== Other associations ==
Hittitologist Gary Beckman pointed out the similarity between Astarte's role as a goddess associated with horses and chariots to that played in Hittite religion by another "Ishtar type" goddess, Pinikir, introduced to Anatolia from Elam by Hurrians.

Allat and Astarte may have been conflated in Palmyra. On one of the tesserae used by the Bel Yedi'ebel for a religious banquet at the temple of Bel, the deity Allat was given the name Astarte ('štrt). The assimilation of Allat to Astarte is not surprising in a milieu as much exposed to Aramaean and Phoenician influences as the one in which the Palmyrene theologians lived.

Plutarch, in his On Isis and Osiris, indicates that the King and Queen of Byblos, who, unknowingly, have the body of Osiris in a pillar in their hall, are Melcarthus (i.e. Melqart) and Astarte (though he notes some instead call the Queen Saosis or Nemanūs, which Plutarch interprets as corresponding to the Greek name Athenais).

Lucian of Samosata asserted that, in the territory of Ṣidōn, the temple of Astarte was sacred to Europa. In Greek mythology, Europa was a Phoenician princess whom Zeus, having transformed himself into a white bull, abducted, and carried to Crete.

Byron used the name Astarte in his poem Manfred.

== In popular culture ==
- In Zadig; or, The Book of Fate (French: Zadig ou la Destinée; 1747), a novella and work of philosophical fiction by the Enlightenment writer Voltaire, Astarté is a woman, a queen of Babylon reduced to slavery, who finds her first and only love: Zadig.
- The name Astarte was given to a massive post-starburst galaxy during the cosmic noon (the peak of the star formation rate density).
- German author Jason Dark featured Astarte in his long-running novel series John Sinclair, in which she is said to be identical with Asherah and Anat. She is depicted as a villain and the historical consort of Baal.
- Astarte appears as a playable Avenger-class Servant in Fate/Grand Order (2015), with her name stylized as "Ashtart". However, she first introduces herself as "Space Ishtar", and only reveals her true name after her third Ascension.
- There is an Idol House of Astarte in the Agatha Christie story "The Idol House of Astarte".
- In the Warhammer 40,000 setting, the High Gothic (stand-in used in place of Latin) name of the Imperial Space Marines is the Adeptus Astartes, named for one of their creators, Amar Astarte, an immortal human.
- In Persona 5, Astarte is a Persona used by playable character Haru Okumura.
- In the light novel series That Time I Got Reincarnated as a Slime, Astarte appears as an Ultimate skill wielded by Demon Lord Dino.
- Astarte was an all-female black metal band from Athens, Greece, named after the goddess.
- In the space opera novel and anime series Legend of The Galactic Heroes, a major space battle, and the first of the series (The Battle of Astarte) takes place in the Astarte star system.

== See also ==
- Anat
- Attar (god)
- Esther
- Ishtar
- Išḫara
- Lilith
- Nanaya
- Nana (Kushan goddess)
- Star of Ishtar
- Tanit
- Asherah
- Atargatis
- Venus

== Bibliography ==
- Agostini, Paolo; Zavaroni, Adolfo (2000). "The Bilingual Phoenician-Etruscan Text of the Golden Plates of Pyrgi". Filologica. 34: 3–46. S2CID 51739010.
- Amadasi Guzzo, Maria Giulia (2010). "Astarte a Malta: il santuario di Tas Silġ". In Antonio Caballos Rufino; et al. (eds.). El Carambolo. Serie Historia y geografía (in Spanish). Vol. 165. Coordinators: María Luisa de la Bandera Romero & Eduardo Ferrer Albelda. Sevilla: Universidad de Sevilla. pp. 465–490. ISBN 978-84-472-1218-7.
- Amadasi Guzzo, Maria Giulia; Zamora López, José Ángel (2020-12-01). "Pratiques administratives phéniciennes à Idalion". Cahiers du Centre d'Études Chypriotes (in French) (50): 137–155. doi:10.4000/cchyp.501. hdl:10261/260990. ISSN 0761-8271. S2CID 249114832.
- Beckman, G. (1999). "The Goddess Pirinkir and Her Ritual from Hattusa (CTH 644)". Ktèma: Civilisations de l'Orient, de la Grèce et de Rome antiques. 24 (24): 25–39. doi:10.3406/ktema.1999.2206. hdl:2027.42/77419.
- Belén, María; Martín Ceballos, María Cruz (2002). "Diosas y leones en el período orientalizante de la Península Ibérica" [Goddesses and lions in the orientalizing period of the Iberian Peninsula] (PDF). SPAL: Revista de Prehistoria y Arqueología de la Universidad de Sevilla (in Spanish). 11 (11): 169–195. doi:10.12795/spal.2002.i11.09. S2CID 161195240.
- Bordreuil, Pierre [in French]; Pardee, Dennis (2009). A Manual of Ugaritic. Winona Lake, Indiana: Eisenbrauns. ISBN 978-1-575-06153-5.
- Breasted, James Henry; Allen, Thomas George, eds. (1932). Medinet Habu - Volume II: Plates 55-150: Later Historical Records of Ramses III (PDF). The University of Chicago Oriental Institute Publications. Vol. 9. Chicago: University of Chicago Press.
- Budin, Stephanie L. (2004). "A Reconsideration of the Aphrodite-Ashtart Syncretism". Numen. 51 (2): 95–145. doi:10.1163/156852704323056643.
- Budin, Stephanie L. (2015). "Qedešet: A Syro-Anatolian Goddess in Egypt". Journal of Ancient Egyptian Interconnections. 7 (4). Tucson, Arizona: University of Arizona: 1–20. doi:10.2458/azu_jaei_v07i4_budin.
- Cooper, Alan (1990). "A Note on the Vocalization of עַשְׁתֹּרֶת". Zeitschrift für die Alttestamentliche Wissenschaft [Journal of Old Testament Studies]. 102 (1): 98–100. doi:10.1515/zatw.1990.102.1.94.
- Davies, Norman de Garis (1953). The Temple of Hibis in El Khārgeh oasis: Part III, the decoration. Publications of the Metropolitan Museum of Art Egyptian Expedition. Vol. 17. New York City: Metropolitan Museum of Art.
- Davila, James R.; Zuckerman, Bruce (1993). "The Throne of ʿAshtart Inscription". Bulletin of the American Schools of Oriental Research. 289 (289): 67–80. doi:10.2307/1357365. ISSN 0003-097X. JSTOR 1357365. S2CID 165597675.
- Dawson, W. R.; Peet, T. E. (1933). "The So-Called Poem on the King's Chariot". Journal of Egyptian Archaeology. 19 (3). London, United Kingdom: Egypt Exploration Society: 167–174. doi:10.2307/3854607. JSTOR 3854607.
- del Olme Lete, G. (2013). "KTU 1.107: A miscellany of incantations against snakebite". In Loretz, O.; Ribichini, S.; Watson, W. G. E.; Zamora, J. Á. (eds.). Ritual, Religion and Reason. Studies in the Ancient World in Honour of Paolo Xella.
- Edwards, I. E. S. (1955). "A Relief of Qudshu-Astarte-Anath in the Winchester College Collection". Journal of Near Eastern Studies. 14 (1). Chicago: University of Chicago Press: 49–51. doi:10.1086/371241. JSTOR 542549. S2CID 162237544.
- Fleming, Daniel E. (1992). The Installation of Baal's High Priestess at Emar: A Window on Ancient Syrian Religion. Atlanta: Scholars' Press. ISBN 978-1-555-40726-1.
- Fraser, P. M. (November 1970). "Greek-Phoenician Bilingual Inscriptions from Rhodes". The Annual of the British School at Athens. 65: 31–36. doi:10.1017/S0068245400014672. ISSN 0068-2454. JSTOR 30103207. S2CID 161972095.
- Gardiner, Alan H. (1932). Late-Egyptian stories. Brussels, Belgium: Édition de la Fondation égyptologique Reine Élisabeth.
- Griffiths, J. Gwyn, ed. (1970). Plutarch's De Iside et Osiride. Cardiff: University of Wales Press.
- Hamed, M. (2021). "Multiwavelength dissection of a massive heavily dust-obscured galaxy and its blue companion at z~2". Astronomy & Astrophysics. 646: A127. arXiv:2101.07724. Bibcode:2021A&A...646A.127H. doi:10.1051/0004-6361/202039577. S2CID 231639096.
- Isaac, Benjamin (2017). "Names: Ethnic, Geographic, and Administrative". Empire and Ideology in the Graeco-Roman World: Selected Papers. Cambridge University Press.
- Kerr, Robert M. (2013). "Notre-Dame-de-la-Ḥuronie? A note on 'Štrt ḥr". Die Welt des Orients. 43 (2): 206–212. doi:10.13109/wdor.2013.43.2.206. ISSN 0043-2547. JSTOR 23608855.
- Krahmalkov, Charles R. (2000). Phoenician-Punic Dictionary. Orientalia Lovaniensia Analecta. Vol. 90. Leuven, Netherlands: Peeters Publishers; Department of Eastern Studies of Katholieke Universiteit Leuven. ISBN 978-9-042-90770-6.
- Leclant, Jean (1960). "Astarté a cheval d'après les représentations égyptiennes" [Astarte on horseback in Egyptian representations]. Syria. 37 (1). Paris, France: Institut Français d'Archéologie de Beyrouth: 1–67. doi:10.3406/syria.1960.5450. JSTOR 4197317.
- Lewis, Theodore J. (2011). "ʿAthtartu's Incantations and the Use of Divine Names as Weapons". Journal of Near Eastern Studies. 70 (2). Chicago: University of Chicago Press: 207–227. doi:10.1086/661117. S2CID 164019024.
- Lipiński, Edward (1995). Dieux et déesses de l'univers phénicien et punique [Gods and Goddesses of the Phoenician and Punic Universe]. Orientalia Lovaniensia analecta (in French). Vol. 64. Leuven, Belgium: Leuven University Press. ISBN 978-9-068-31690-2.
- Madsen, Henry (1904). "Zwei Inschriften in Kopenhagen" [Two inscriptions in Copenhagen]. Zeitschrift für Ägyptische Sprache und Altertumskunde [Journal of Egyptian Language and Archaeology] (in German). 41–42. Leipzig, Germany: J. C. Hinrichs'sche Buchhandlung: 114–116. doi:10.1524/zaes.1905.4142.jg.114. S2CID 192985658.
- Milik, J. T.; Cross, Frank Moore (2003). "Inscribed Arrowheads from the Period of the Judges". In Cross, Frank Moore (ed.). Leaves from an Epigrapher's Notebook: Collected Papers in Hebrew and West Semitic Palaeography and Epigraphy. Winona Lake, Indiana: Eisenbrauns. pp. 303–308. ISBN 978-1-575-06911-1.
- Pardee, Dennis (2002). Lewis, Theodore J. (ed.). Ritual and Cult at Ugarit. Writings from the Ancient World. Vol. 10. Atlanta: Society of Biblical Literature. ISBN 978-9-004-12657-2.
- Pardee, Dennis (2012). "Literary Composition in the Hebrew Bible: The View from Ugarit". The Ugaritic Texts and the Origins of West-Semitic Literary Composition. Kettering, United Kingdom: British Academy; Oxford University Press. pp. 78–124. ISBN 978-0-197-26492-8.
- Pardee, Dennis (2014). "RS 18.113A+B, Lettre d'un serviteur du roi d'Ougarit se trouvant à Chypre" [Letter of a servant of the king of Ugarit in Cyprus]. Ras Shamra 18.113A+B, Lettre d'un serviteur du roi d'Ougarit se trouvant à Chypre [Ras Shamra 18.113A+B, Letter of a servant of the king of Ugarit in Cyprus]. Analecta Gorgiana (in French). Vol. 1000. Piscataway, New Jersey: Gorgias Press. pp. 167–206. ISBN 978-1-463-2353-69.
- Parpola, Simo; Watanabe, Kazuko (1988). Neo-Assyrian Treaties and Loyalty Oaths. State Archives of Assyria. Vol. 2. Helsinki, Finland: Helsinki University Press. ISBN 978-1-575-06332-4.
- Salinas de Frías, Manuel (2013). "El Afrodísion Óros de Viriato" (PDF). Palaeohispanica. (Ejemplar dedicado a: Acta Palaeohispanica XI: Actas del XI Coloquio Internacional de Lenguas y Culturas Prerromanas de la Península Ibérica) (in Spanish). 13: 257–271. ISSN 1578-5386.
- Schmitt, Rüdiger (2013). "Astarte, Mistress of Horses, Lady of the Chariot: The Warrior Aspect of Astarte". Die Welt des Orients. 43 (2): 213–225. doi:10.13109/wdor.2013.43.2.213. JSTOR 23608856.
- Slouschz, Nahoum (1942). Thesaurus of Phoenician Inscriptions (in Hebrew). Dvir.
- Steiner, Richard C. (1992). "Northwest Semitic Incantations in an Egyptian Medical Papyrus of the Fourteenth Century B. C. E.". Journal of Near Eastern Studies. 51 (3). Chicago: University of Chicago Press: 191–200. doi:10.1086/373551. JSTOR 545544. PMID 16468200. S2CID 7236600.
- Steiner, Richard C. (2001). "The Scorpion Spell from Wadi Hammamat: Another Aramaic Text in Demotic Script". Journal of Near Eastern Studies. 60 (4). Chicago: University of Chicago Press: 259–268. doi:10.1086/468948. JSTOR 545937. PMID 16468205. S2CID 39409692.
- Sugimoto, David, ed. (2014). Transformation of a Goddess: Ishtar - Astarte - Aphrodite (PDF). Fribourg, Switzerland; Göttingen, Germany: Academic Press Fribourg; Vandenhoeck & Ruprecht. ISBN 978-3-727-81748-9.
  - Smith, Mark S. "‛Athtart in Late Bronze Age Syrian Texts". In Sugimoto (2014), pp. 33–85.
  - Cornelius, I. ""Revisiting" Astarte in the Iconography of the Bronze Age Levant". In Sugimoto (2014), pp. 97–101.
  - Bloch-Smith, E. "Archaeological and Inscriptional Evidence for Phoenician Astarte". In Sugimoto (2014), pp. 167–194.
- Snaith (1954). The Interpreter's Bible. Vol. 3.
- Teixidor, Javier (1979). The Pantheon of Palmyra. Brill Archive. ISBN 978-90-04-05987-0.
- v. Bergmann, E. [in German] (1886). "Inschriftliche Denkmäler der Sammlung Ägyptischer Alterthümer des Österreichischen Kaiserhauses" [Inscribed Monuments from the Collection of Egyptian Antiquities of the Austrian Imperial Family] (PDF). Recueil de travaux relatifs à la philologie et à l'archéologie égyptiennes et assyriennes [Collection of Works Relating to Egyptian and Assyrian Philology and Archaeology]. 7. Paris, France: Vieweg Verlag: 177–196. doi:10.11588/diglit.12254.20.
- van der Toorn, Karel; Becking, Bob; van der Horst, Pieter W. (1999). Dictionary Of Deities And Demons In The Bible (2nd ed.). Brill.
- Varille, Alexandre (1942). "La grande stèle d'Aménophis II à Giza" [The large stela of Amenhotep II at Giza]. Bulletin de l'Institut français d'archéologie orientale [Bulletin of the French Institute of Oriental Archeology]. 41 (1942). Cairo, Egypt: Institut Français d'Archéologie Orientale: 31–38. doi:10.3406/bifao.1942.2018.
- Vázquez Hoys, Ana María (1998). "En manos de Astarté, la Abrasadora" [In the hands of Astarte, the Scorching] (PDF). Aldaba (in Spanish) (30). Universidad Nacional de Educación a Distancia: 89–140. doi:10.5944/aldaba.30.1998.20444 (inactive 11 July 2025). ISSN 0213-7925.
- Vittmann, Günter [in German] (1984). "Ein Zauberspruch gegen Skorpione im Wadi Hammamat" [A Spell against Scorpions in Wadi Hammamat]. In Thissen, Heinz-J. [in German]; Zauzich, Karl-Th. [in German] (eds.). Grammata demotika: Festschrift für Erich Lüddeckens zum 15. Juni 1983 [Grammata demotika: Festschrift for Erich Lüddeckens on June 15, 1983] (in German). Würzburg, Germany: Gisela Zauzich Verlag. p. 245-256. ISBN 978-3-924-15101-0.
- Wiggins, S. A. (2007). A Reassessment of Asherah: With Further Considerations of the Goddess. Piscataway, NJ: Gorgias Press. ISBN 978-1-59333-717-9.
- Wreszinski, Walter (1912). Der Londoner medizinische Papyrus (Brit. Museum nr. 10,059) und der Papyrus Hearst: in Transkription, Übersetzung Kommentar [The London Medical Papyrus (Brit. Museum n. 10,059) and the Hearst Papyrus: in Transcription, Translation Commentary] (in German). Leipzig, Germany: J. C. Hinrichs'sche Buchhandlung.
- Zernecke, Anna Elise (2013). "The Lady of the Titles: The Lady of Byblos and the Search for her "True Name"". Die Welt des Orients. 43 (2): 227. doi:10.13109/wdor.2013.43.2.226. ISSN 0043-2547. JSTOR 23608857.
