= Temple of Isis =

The Temple of Isis, also known as an Iseum (from Latin) or Iseion (from Greek), may refer to:

- The temple of the birth of Isis at Dendera Temple complex in Qena, Egypt
- The temple of Isis at Philae, Egypt
- The temple of Isis at Behbeit el-Hagar, Egypt
- The temple of Isis at Menouthis, Egypt
- The temple of Isis on Antirhodos in Alexandria, Egypt
- The temple of Isis on Delos, Greece
- The temple of Isis in Eretria on Euboea, Greece
- The Temple of Isis and Serapis on the Campus Martius in Rome, Italy
- The Temple of Isis at Pompeii, Italy
- The reconstructed temple of Isis at Szombathely, Hungary

== See also ==
- Isis Temple, a rocky prominence in the Grand Canyon, US
- The Isis-Urania Temple, a temple of the Hermetic Order of the Golden Dawn
