= Ur Box inscription =

7th-century BC Phoenician inscription

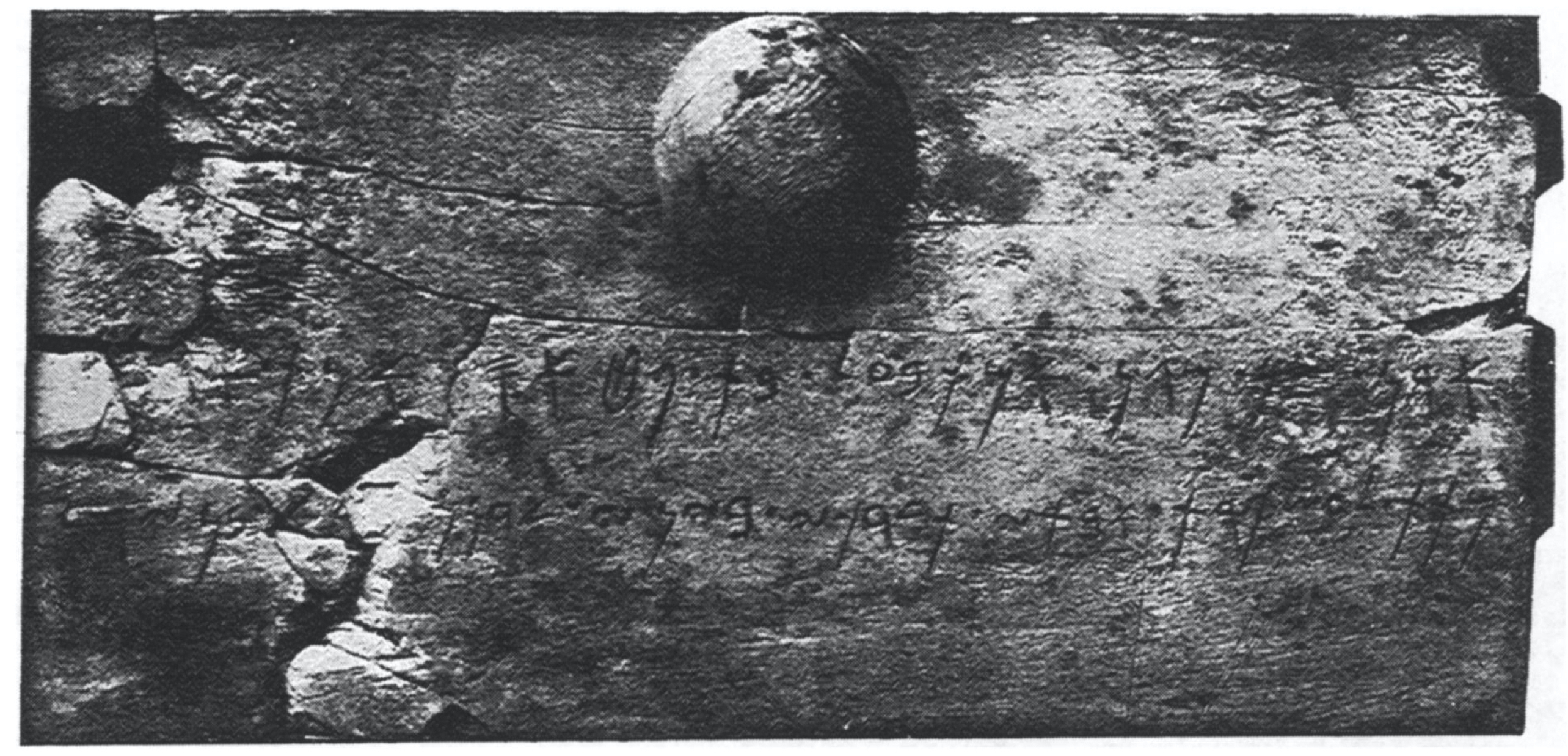
Ur Box inscription (front of box)

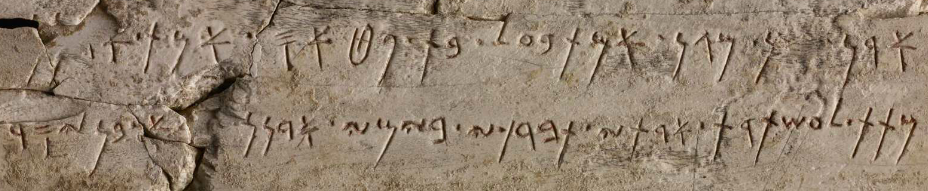
Ur Box inscription (inscription close up)

The Ur Box inscription is a 7th century BCE Phoenician inscription on the lid of an ivory box found in Ur in 1927 during the excavations of Leonard Woolley (a joint excavation by the British Museum and Penn Museum). It was the first Phoenician inscription found in Iraq.

It is currently in the archives of the British Museum, with ID number BM 120528.

== Description ==
The box measures 11 x 5 cm. The script resembles the Neirab steles.

=== Inscription ===
Guzzo proposes a translation of:

This coffer here(?) ’MTB‘L, daughter of PṬ’S, servant of our lord(?), has offered
as a gift(?) to her lady Ashtart; may she bless her. In his days, (the days) of our lord... son of YSD/YSR.

== Discovery ==
It was found beneath "Nebuchadnezzar's pavement of the north-east chamber of the sanctuary E-nun-mah", providing a lower limit for the dating of the box.

== Interpretation ==
Eric Burrows, in his 1927 interpretation of the inscription, stated: "Was the inscription made at Ur or in Phoenicia? Probably in Phoenicia... The box probably reached Mesopotamia in the course of the Syrian wars [i.e. the Neo-Assyrian conquests]".

== Bibliography ==
- Amadasi Guzzo, M. (1990). Two Phoenician Inscriptions Carved in Ivory: Again the Ur Box and the Sarepta Plaque. Orientalia, 59(1), nova series, 58-66
