= Colonia Junonia =

Ancient Roman colony

Colonia Junonia (sometimes Iunonia) refers to an Ancient Roman colony established in 122 BC under the direction of Gaius Gracchus.

== History ==
It is significant as it was the first 'transmarine' Roman colony. The colony was located at the site of the destroyed city of Carthage, a reason for its widespread unpopularity with Romans. Those superstitious about the site spread reports of ill omens, including a claim that wolves had carried off the boundary stakes. The colony would only last 30 years.

Julius Caesar later rebuilt Carthage on the site between 49 and 44 BC, the city became the second largest city in the republic.

== See also ==
- Roman 'Coloniae' in Berber Africa
- Carthage
