= Baalshillem I =

Phoenician king of Sidon (5th century BC)

King of Sidon
- Reign: c. 450 BC – c. 426 BC
- Predecessor: ?
- Successor: Abdamon
- Phoenician language: 𐤁𐤏𐤋𐤔𐤋𐤌
- Dynasty: Baalshillem I dynasty
- Religion: Canaanite polytheism

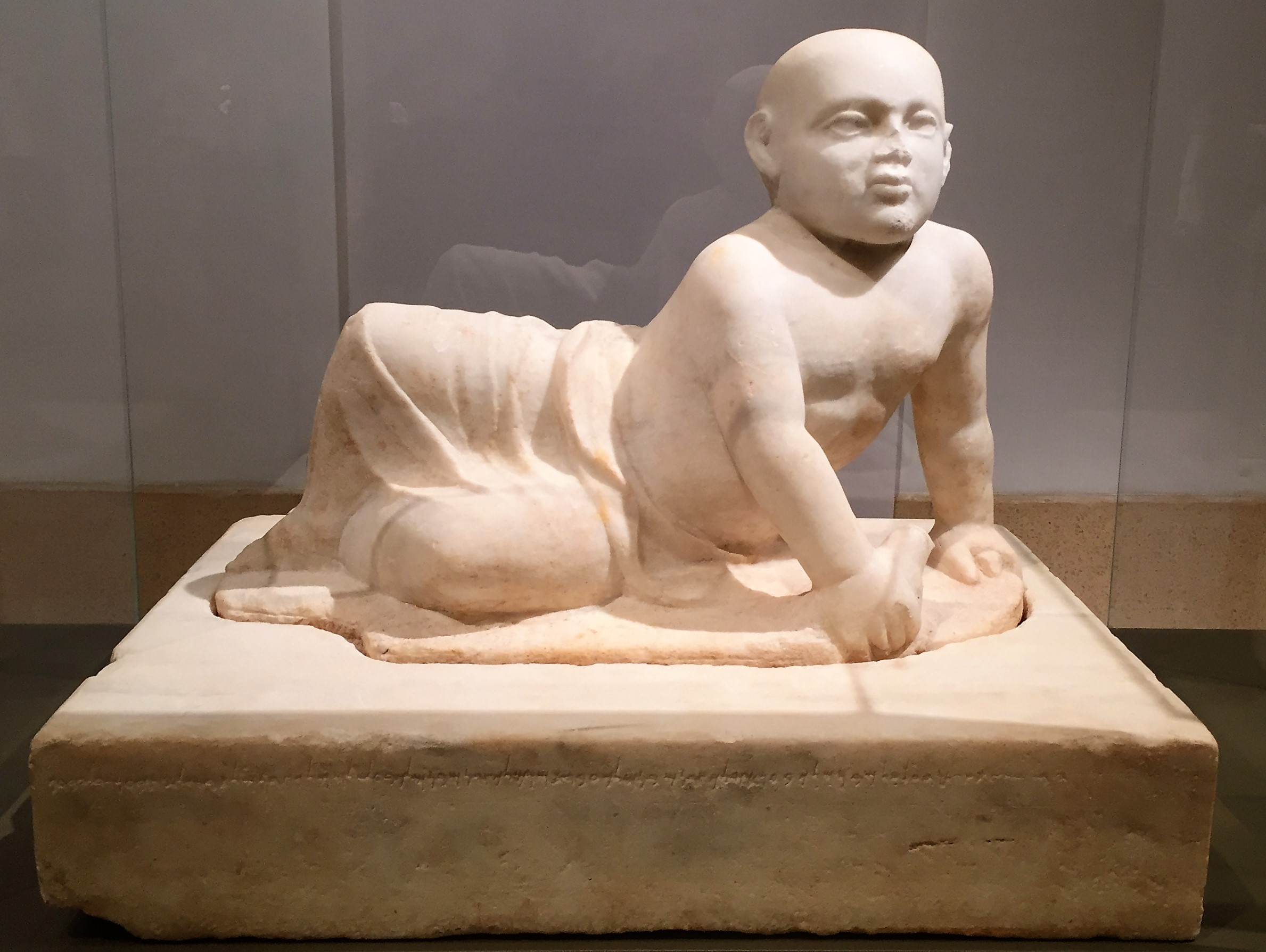
Baalshillem Temple Boy: a votive (to Eshmun) marble statue of a royal child, inscribed in Phoenician, from the Eshmun sanctuary, c. 400s BC

Baalshillem I (also transliterated Baalchillem, meaning "recompense of Baal"; Phoenician: 𐤁𐤏𐤋𐤔𐤋𐤌) was a Phoenician King of Sidon (c. 450 – c. 426 BC), and a vassal of the Achaemenid Empire. He was succeeded by his son Abdamon to the throne of Sidon.

== Etymology ==
The name Baalshillem is the Romanized form of the Phoenician 𐤁𐤏𐤋𐤔𐤋𐤌 (BʿLŠLM), meaning "recompense of Baal". Alternative spellings of the king's name include Baalchillem.

== Chronology ==
The absolute chronology of the kings of Sidon from the dynasty of Eshmunazar I onward has been much discussed in the literature; traditionally placed in the course of the fifth century BC, inscriptions of this dynasty have been dated back to an earlier period on the basis of numismatic, historical and archaeological evidence. The most complete work addressing the dates of the reigns of these Sidonian kings is by the French historian Josette Elayi who shifted away from the use of biblical chronology. Elayi used all the available documentation of the time and included inscribed Tyrian seals and stamps excavated by the Lebanese archaeologist Maurice Chehab in 1972 from Jal el-Bahr, a neighborhood in the north of Tyre, ⁣ Phoenician inscriptions discovered by the French archaeologist Maurice Dunand in Sidon in 1965, and the systematic study of Sidonian coins which were the first coins to bear minting dates in antiquity based on the years of reign of the Sidonian kings.

Baalshillem I was the first among Sidonian monarchs to mark coins with issuing dates corresponding with the years of his reign as of year 30 which corresponds to 372 BC. Elayi established that Baalshillem I's year of accession was 450 BC and that he reigned until 426 BC.

== Historical context ==
In 539 BC, Phoenicia fell under the Achaemenid rule; it was divided into four vassal kingdoms: Sidon, Tyre, Byblos and Arwad. Eshmunazar I, a priest of Astarte and the founder of his namesake dynasty was enthroned King of Sidon around the time of the Achaemenid conquest of the Levant. During the first phase of Achaemenid rule, Sidon flourished and reclaimed its former standing as Phoenicia's chief city. In the mid 5th century BC, Eshmunazar's dynasty was succeeded by that of Baalshillem I; this dynastic turnover coincides with the time by which Sidon began to independently mint its own coinage bearing the images of its reigning kings.

== Epigraphic and numismatic sources ==
The name of Baalshillem I is known from a votive statue of a "temple boy" offered to Eshmun, the Phoenician god of healing, by the great-grandson of King Baalshillem I, his namesake Baalshillem II. The base of the Baalshillem temple boy statue bears a Phoenician inscription known as KAI 281. The inscription reads:

This (is the) statue that Baalshillem, son of King Ba'na, king of the Sidonians, son of King Abdamun, king of the Sidonians, son of King Baalshillem, king of the Sidonians, gave to his lord Eshmun at the "Ydll" Spring. May he bless him.

The statue is of note because its inscription provides the names of four kings of Sidon from the Baalshillem I dynasty. The statue also represents the young future king Abdashtart I, who may have been five or six months of age at the time of the dedication of the statue.

Baalshillem I is also known from the coins he struck under his reign. The coins dating from the reign of the Baalshillem I dynasty show the abbreviated names of the respective kings, a custom of the Sidonian royalty. King Baalshillem I's name is abbreviated as B. The obverse of the coins of Baalshillem I usually showed a galley in front of Sidonian wall fortifications.

== Genealogy ==
Baalshillem I's dynasty succeeded that of Eshmunazar I; his heir was his son Abdamun.

Baalshillem I dynasty

Baalshillem I
Abdamon
Baana
Baalshillem II
Abdashtart I

== See also ==
- King of Sidon — A list of the ancient rulers of the city of Sidon

== Bibliography ==
- Boardman, John; Hammond, Nicholas Geoffrey Lemprière; Lewis, David Malcolm; Ostwald, Martin (2000). The Cambridge Ancient History: Persia, Greece and the Western Mediterranean c.525 to 479 B.C. Vol. 4. Cambridge: Cambridge University Press. ISBN 9780521228046.
- Bonnet, Corinne (2017). "Cartographier les mondes divins à partir des épithètes : prémisses et ambitions d'un projet de recherche européen (ERC Advanced Grant)". Rivista di studi fenici. XLV.
- Chéhab, Maurice (1983). "Découvertes phéniciennes au Liban" [Phoenician discoveries in Lebanon]. Atti del I congresso internazionale di studi Fenici e Punici [Proceedings of the first International Congress of Phoenician and Punic studies] (in French).
- Dunand, Maurice (1965). "Nouvelles inscriptions phéniciennes du temple d'Echmoun, près Sidon" [New Phoenician inscriptions from the temple of Echmoun, near Sidon]. Bulletin du Musée de Beyrouth (in French). 18. Ministère de la Culture – Direction Générale des Antiquités (Liban): 105–109.
- Elayi, Josette; Elayi, A. G. (2004). Le monnayage de la cité phénicienne de Sidon à l'époque perse (Ve-IVe s. av. J.-C.): Texte [The coinage of the Phoenician city of Sidon in the Persian era (V–IV s. av. J.-C.): Text] (in French). Paris: Gabalda. ISBN 9782850211584.
- Elayi, Josette (2006). "An updated chronology of the reigns of Phoenician kings during the Persian period (539–333 BCE)" (PDF). Digitorient. Collège de France – UMR7912. Archived from the original (PDF) on 2020-07-30.
- Elayi, Josette (2007). "Gerashtart, King of the Phoenician City of Arwad in the 4th century BC". The Numismatic Chronicle. 167: 99–104. ISSN 0078-2696. JSTOR 42666933.
- Elayi, Josette (2010). "An Unexpected Archaeological Treasure: The Phoenician Quarters in Beirut City Center". Near Eastern Archaeology. 73 (2–3): 156–168. doi:10.1086/nea25754044. ISSN 1094-2076.
- Elayi, Josette (2018a). The History of Phoenicia. Atlanta, Georgia: Lockwood Press. ISBN 9781937040819.
- Gibson, John Clark Love (1982). Textbook of Syrian Semitic inscriptions. Vol. 3. Oxford: Clarendon Press. ISBN 9780198131991.
- Greenfield, Jonas C. (1985). "A Group of Phoenician City Seals". Israel Exploration Journal. 35 (2/3). Israel Exploration Society: 129–134. ISSN 0021-2059. JSTOR 27925980.
- Ingraham, Holly (1997). People's Names: A Cross-cultural Reference Guide to the Proper Use of Over 40,000 Personal and Familial Names in Over 100 Cultures. McFarland & Company. ISBN 978-0-7864-0187-1.
- Kaoukabani, Ibrahim (2005). "Les estampilles phénicienne de Tyr" [The Phoenician stamps of Tyre] (PDF). Archaeology & History in the Lebanon (in French) (21). AHL: 3–79.
- Markoe, Glenn (2000). Phoenicians. Berkeley: University of California Press. ISBN 9780520226142.
- Pritchard, James B.; Fleming, Daniel E. (2011). The Ancient Near East: An Anthology of Texts and Pictures. Princeton: Princeton University Press. ISBN 9780691147260.
- Vance, Donald R. (1994). "Literary Sources for the History of Palestine and Syria: The Phœnician Inscriptions,". The Biblical Archaeologist. 57 (1): 2–19. doi:10.2307/3210392. ISSN 0006-0895.
- Vanel, Antoine (1967). Bulletin du Musée de Beyrouth (in French). Beirut: Musée National de Beyrouth.
- Xella, Paolo; López, José-Ángel Zamora (2005a). "L'inscription phénicienne de Bodashtart in situ à Bustān eš-Šēḫ (Sidon) et son apport à l'histoire du sanctuaire". Zeitschrift des Deutschen Palästina-Vereins. 121 (2): 119–129. ISSN 0012-1169.
- Xella, Paolo; López, José-Ángel Zamora (2005b). "Nouveaux documents phéniciens du sanctuaire d'Eshmoun à Bustan esh-Sheikh (Sidon)" [New Phoenician documents from the sanctuary of Eshmun in Bustan esh-Sheikh (Sidon)]. In Arruda, A. M. (ed.). Atti del VI congresso internazionale di studi Fenici e Punici [Proceedings of the 6th International Congress of Phoenician and Punic studies] (in French). Lisbon: Gregorian Biblical Press. pp. 100–114.
- Zamora, José-Ángel (2016). "Autres rois, autre temple: la dynastie d'Eshmounazor et le sanctuaire extra-urbain de Eshmoun à Sidon" [Other kings, other temple: the dynasty of Eshmunazor and the extra-urban sanctuary of Eshmun in Sidon]. In Russo Tagliente, Alfonsina; Guarneri, Francesca (eds.). Santuari mediterranei tra Oriente e Occidente : interazioni e contatti culturali : atti del Convegno internazionale, Civitavecchia – Roma 2014 [Mediterranean sanctuaries between East and West: interactions and cultural contacts: Proceedings of the International Conference, Civitavecchia–Rome 2014] (in French). Rome: Scienze e lettere. pp. 253–262. ISBN 9788866870975.

Preceded by ?	King of Sidon c. 450– c. 426BC	Succeeded by Baana
