= Eshmunazar II =

6th-century BC Phoenician king of Sidon

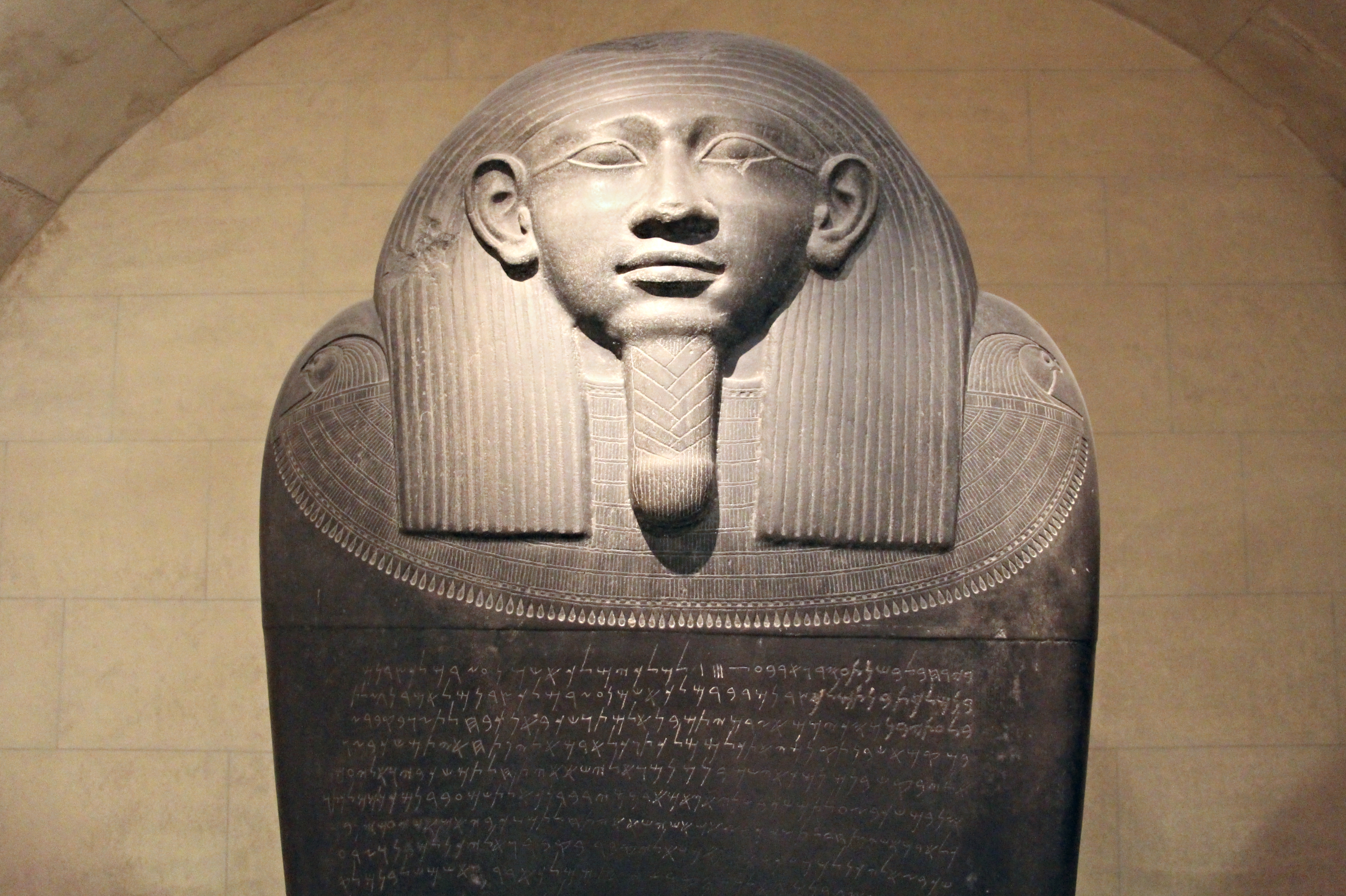
- Phoenician-inscribed sarcophagus of King Eshmunazar II from the Sidon royal necropolis, displayed in the Louvre

King of Sidon
- Reign: c. 539 BC – c. 525 BC
- Predecessor: Tabnit I
- Successor: Bodashtart
- Burial: Sidon royal necropolis
- Phoenician language: 𐤀𐤔𐤌𐤍𐤏𐤆𐤓
- Dynasty: Eshmunazar I dynasty
- Religion: Canaanite polytheism

Eshmunazar II ([æʃmuːn ʔɑːzər]; Phoenician: 𐤀𐤔𐤌𐤍𐤏𐤆𐤓, ʾšmnʿzr, lit. 'Eshmun helps') was the Phoenician king of Sidon (r. c. 539 – c. 525 BC). He was the grandson of Eshmunazar I, and a vassal king of the Persian Achaemenid Empire. Eshmunazar II succeeded his father Tabnit I who ruled for a short time and died before the birth of his son. Tabnit I was succeeded by his sister-wife Amoashtart who ruled alone until Eshmunazar II's birth, and then acted as his regent until the time he would have reached majority. Eshmunazar II died prematurely at the age of 14. He was succeeded by his cousin Bodashtart.

Eshmunazar II came from a lineage of priests of the goddess Astarte, and his rule saw a strong emphasis on religious activities. He and his mother Amoashtart built temples in various parts of Sidon and its neighboring territories. During his reign, King Cambyses II of Persia rewarded Sidon for its military contributions to his campaign against Egypt by granting Sidon additional territory. Eshmunazar II is primarily known for his sarcophagus, which features two Phoenician inscriptions; it is currently housed in the Louvre Museum.

== Etymology ==
Eshmunazar is the Romanized form of the Phoenician theophoric name 𐤀𐤔𐤌𐤍𐤏𐤆𐤓, meaning "Eshmun helps". Eshmun was the Phoenician god of healing and renewal of life; he was one of the most important divinities of the Phoenician pantheon and the main male divinity of the city of Sidon.

The name is also transliterated as: ʾEšmunʿazor, ʾšmnʿzr, Achmounazar, Ashmounazar, Ashmunazar, Ashmunezer, Echmounazar, Echmounazor, Eschmoun-ʿEzer, Eschmunazar, Eshmnʿzr, Eshmunazor, Esmounazar, Esmunasar, Esmunazar, Ešmunʿazor, Ešmunazar, Ešmunazor.

== Historical context ==
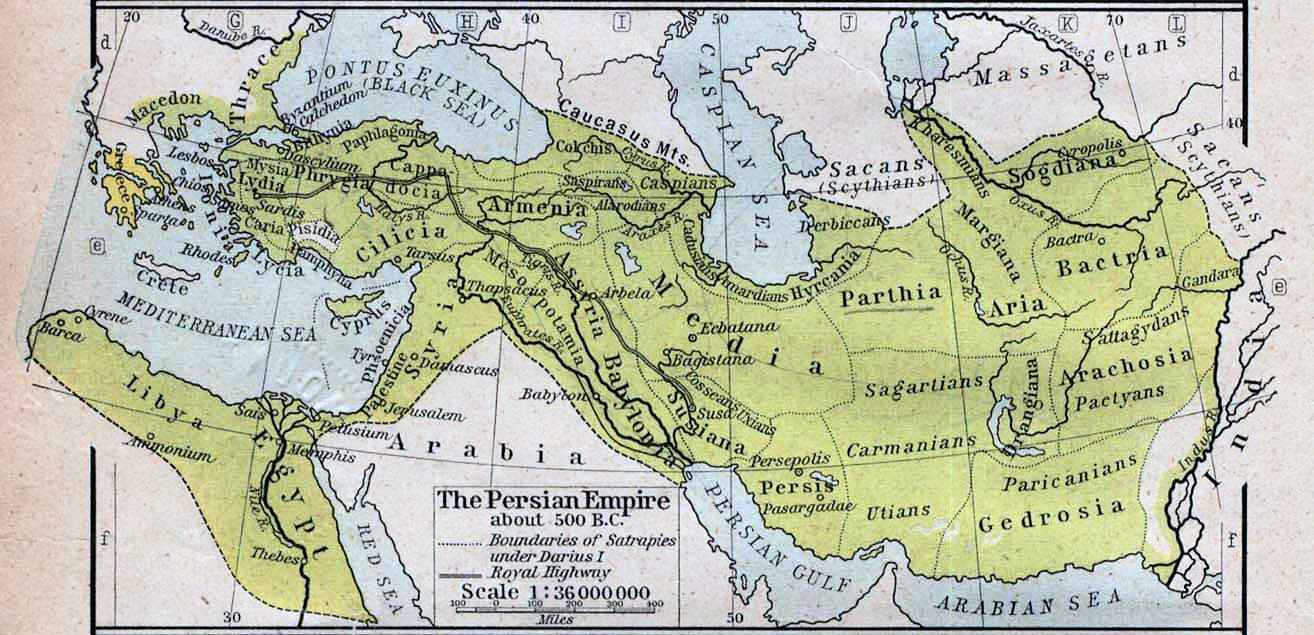
Map showing Phoenicia within the Persian Achaemenid Empire (c. 500 BC)

Sidon, which was a flourishing and independent Phoenician city-state, came under Mesopotamian occupation in the ninth century BC. The Assyrian king Ashurnasirpal II (r. 883 – 859 BC) conquered the Lebanon mountain range and its coastal cities, including Sidon. In 705 BC, King Luli, who reigned over both Tyre and Sidon, joined forces with the Egyptians and Judah in an unsuccessful rebellion against Assyrian rule. He was forced to flee to Kition, on the neighboring island of Cyprus, upon the arrival of the Assyrian army headed by Sennacherib. Sennacherib placed Ittobaal on the throne of Sidon and imposed an annual tribute. (Note: I placed Tu-Baʾlu on his royal throne over them and imposed upon him tribute (and) payment (in recognition) of my overlordship (to be delivered) yearly (and) without interruption.) Josette Elayi believes that Ittobaal was of royal Sidonian lineage, a family line driven out of power by the reigning Tyrian kings. When Abdi-Milkutti ascended to Sidon's throne in 680 BC, he also rebelled against the Assyrians. In response, the Assyrian king Esarhaddon captured and beheaded Abdi-Milkutti in 677 BC after a three-year siege; Sidon was stripped of its territory, which was awarded to Baal I, the king of rival Tyre and a loyal vassal to Esarhaddon.

Sidon returned to its former prosperity while Tyre was besieged for thirteen years (586–573 BC) by the Chaldean king Nebuchadnezzar II. The Babylonian province of Phoenicia and its neighbours passed to Achaemenid rule with the conquest of Babylon by Cyrus the Great in 539/8 BC. Phoenicia was then divided into four vassal kingdoms: Sidon, Tyre, Byblos and Arwad. Eshmunazar II, a priest of the Phoenician goddess Astarte, became king around the same time. During the early Persian period (539–486 BC), Sidon rose to power, becoming Phoenicia's pre-eminent city. Sidonian kings began an extensive program of mass-scale construction projects attested in the funerary inscription on the sarcophagus of Eshmunazar II and the dedicatory Bodashtart inscriptions found on the foundations of the Temple of Eshmun's monumental podium.

== Reign ==
=== Chronology and length of reign ===
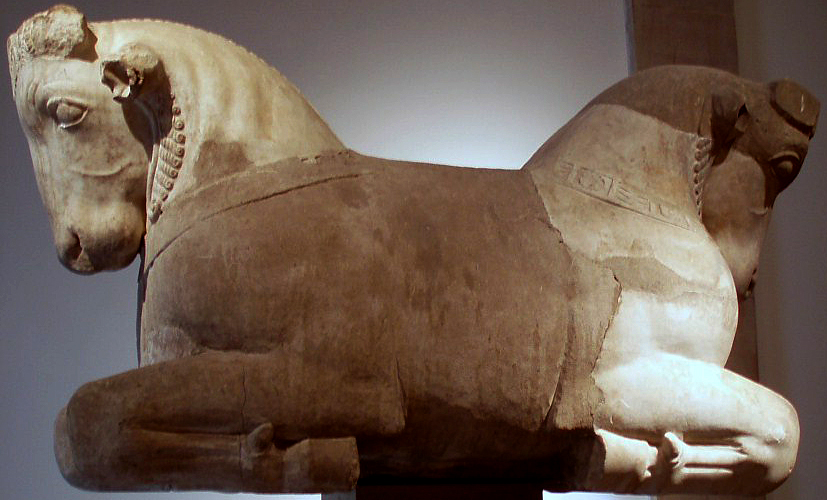
Achaemenid-inspired bull protome column capital from the Temple of Eshmun, Lebanon

Eshmunazar is believed to have reigned in the later half of the sixth century BC, during the Persian Achaemenid Period of Sidon's history, from c. 539 BC until his premature death c. 525 BC. The absolute chronology of the kings of Sidon from the dynasty of Eshmunazar I onward has been much discussed in the literature; traditionally placed in the course of the fifth century BC, inscriptions of this dynasty have been dated back to an earlier period on the basis of numismatic, historical and archaeological evidence. An examination of the dates of the reigns of these Sidonian kings has been presented by the French historian Josette Elayi, who shifted away from the use of biblical chronology. Elayi placed the reigns of the descendants of Eshmunazar I between the middle and the end of the sixth century BC. Elayi used all of the documentation available at the time, including inscribed Tyrian seals, and stamps excavated by the Lebanese archaeologist Maurice Chehab in 1972 from Jal el-Bahr, a neighborhood in the north of Tyre. Elayi also used Phoenician inscriptions discovered by the French archaeologist Maurice Dunand in Sidon in 1965, and conducted a systematic study of Sidonian coins.

=== Temple building and territorial expansion ===
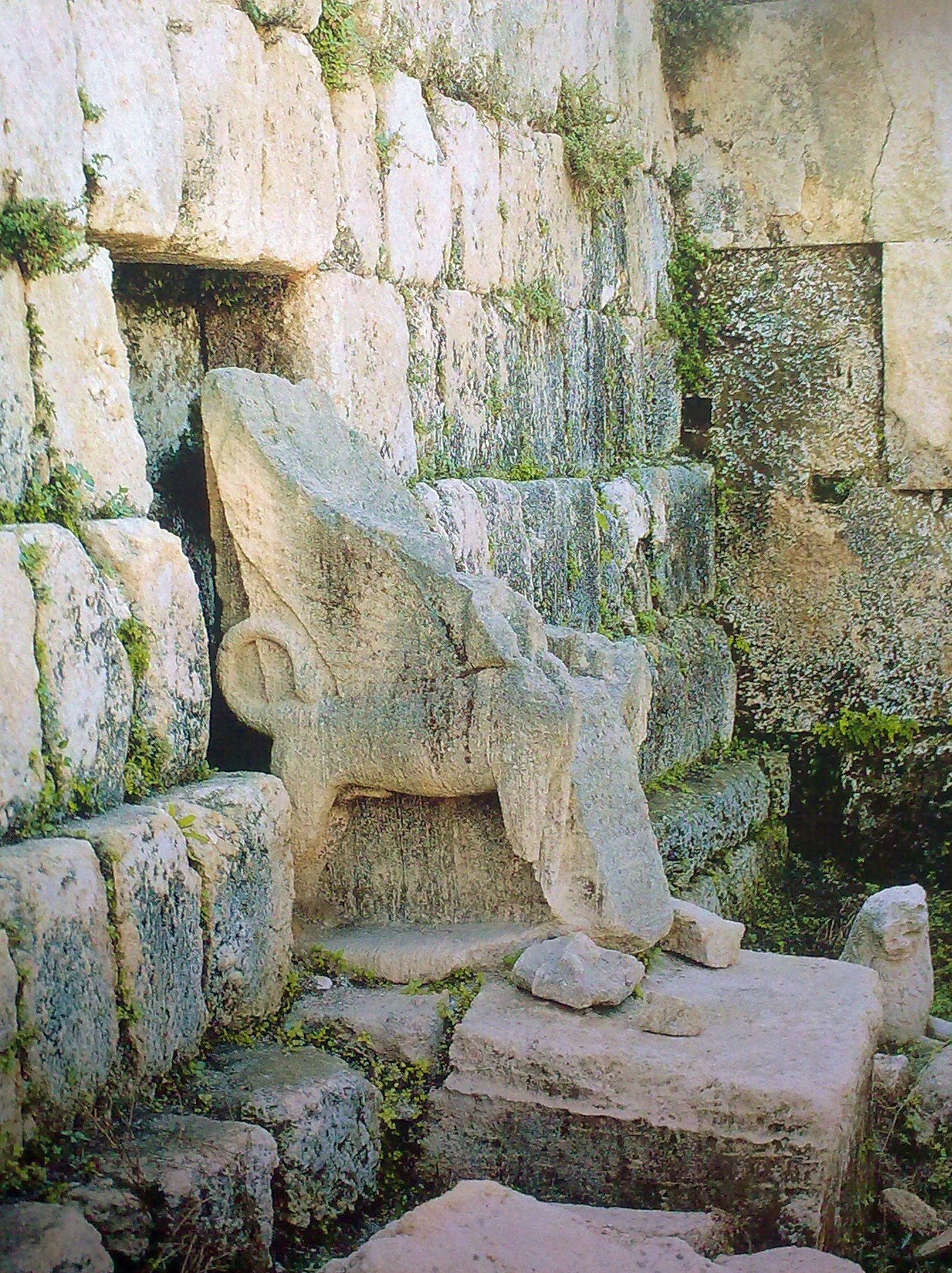
Throne of Astarte at the Temple of Eshmun in Bustan-el-Sheikh in the vicinity of Sidon, Lebanon. The temple by the Ydll source is mentioned in line 17 of the inscription of the sarcophagus of Eshmunazar II.

The kings of Sidon held priestly roles in addition to military, judicial and diplomatic responsibilities. Some locally minted coins display scenes suggesting that the Sidonian kings actively participated in religious ceremonies. Eshmunazar II descended from a line of priests; his father Tabnit and his grandfather Eshmunazar I were priests of Astarte, in addition to being kings of Sidon, as recorded on Tabnit's sarcophagus inscriptions. (Note: I, Tabnit, priest of Astarte, king of Sidon, the son of Eshmunazar, priest of Astarte, king of Sidon, am lying in this sarcophagus. Whoever you are, any man that might find this sarcophagus, do not, do not open it and do not disturb me, for no silver is gathered with me, no gold is gathered with me, nor anything of value whatsoever, only I am lying in this sarcophagus. do not, do not open it and do not disturb me, for this thing is an abomination to Astarte. And if you do indeed open it and do indeed disturb me, may you not have any seed among the living under the sun, nor a resting-place with the Rephaites.) Eshmunazar II's mother was also a priestess of Astarte as illustrated on line 14 of her son's sarcophagus inscriptions. The construction and restoration of temples and the execution of priestly duties served as promotional tools used by Sidonian monarchs to bolster their political power and magnificence, and to depict them as pious recipients of divine favor and protection. This royal function was manifested by Eshmunazar II and his mother Queen Amoashtart through the construction of new temples and religious buildings for the Phoenician gods Baal, Astarte, and Eshmun in a number of Sidon's neighborhoods and its adjoining territory. (Note: See lines 15–18 of the Eshmunazar II sarchophagus inscription.)

In recognition of Sidon's naval warfare contributions, the Achaemenids awarded Eshmunazar II the territories of Dor, Joppa, and the Plain of Sharon. (Note: See lines 18–20 of the Eshmunazar II sarchophagus inscription.) (Note: The territories of the Phoenician cities could be discontiguous: thus, the lands and the cities of Dor and Joppa belonging to the Sidonians were separated from Sidon by the city of Tyre.)

== Succession and death ==
Phoenician kingship was lifelong and hereditary. The responsibilities and power of the position were passed down to the king's child or another member of their family when they died. The royal ancestry and lineage of Sidonian kings were documented up to the second- or third-degree ancestor, as evidenced by lines 13 and 14 of Eshmunazar II's sarcophagus inscription. Queen mothers held political power and exercised in the form of association with political acts and co-regency. Eshmunazar II's father, Tabnit I, ruled for a short time and died before the birth of his son; he was succeeded by his sister-wife Amoashtart, who assumed the role of regent during the interregnum. Eshmunazar II died aged 14 during the reign of his overlord, Cambyses II of Achaemenid Persia. After his death, Eshmunazar II was succeeded by his cousin Bodashtart.

=== Eshmunazar II's sarcophagus ===
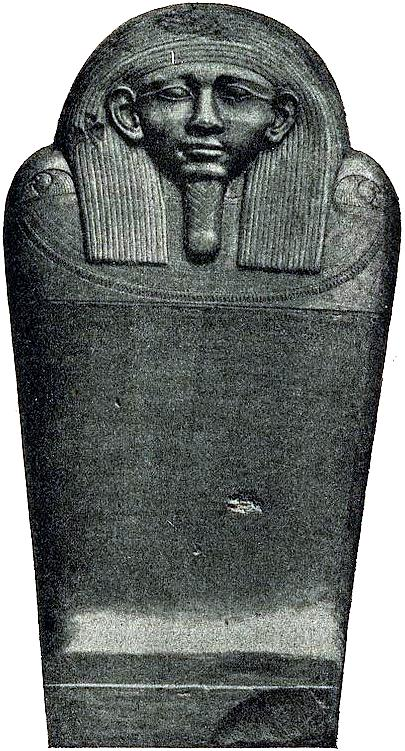
1892 picture of the sarcophagus lid

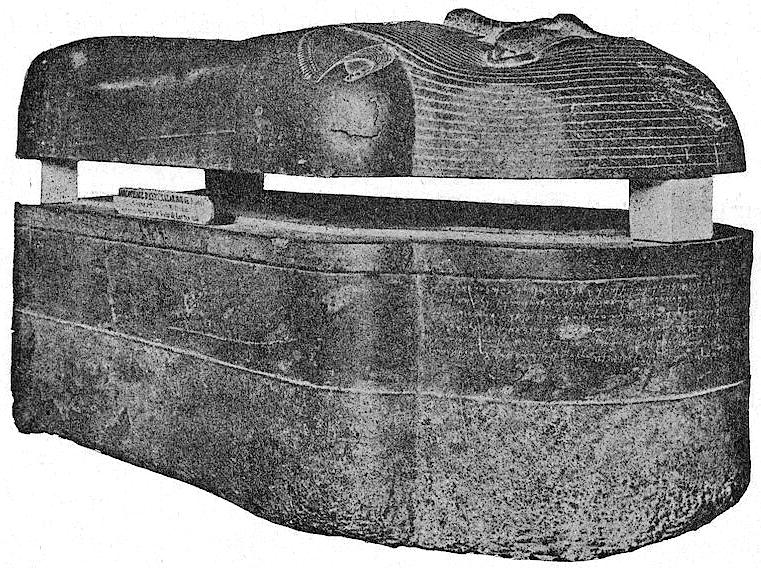
1892 picture of the sarcophagus with the trough inscription visible under the lid

The sarcophagus of Eshmunazar II is one of the only three Ancient Egyptian sarcophagi found outside Egypt; the other two belonged to Eshmunazar's parents, Tabnit and Amoashtart. It was likely carved in Egypt from local amphibolite for a member of the Egyptian elite, and captured as booty by the Sidonians during their participation in Cambyses II's conquest of Egypt in 525 BC. The sarcophagus has two sets of Phoenician inscriptions, one on its lid and a partial copy of it on the sarcophagus trough, around the curvature of the head. The sarcophagus was discovered on 19 January 1855, as treasure-hunters were digging in the grounds of an ancient cemetery in the plains south of the city of Sidon. It was found outside a hollowed-out rocky mound locally known as Magharet Abloun ('The Cavern of Apollo'), a part of a large complex of Achaemenid era necropoli. The discovery is attributed to Alphonse Durighello, an agent of the French consulate in Sidon, who informed and sold the sarcophagus to Aimé Péretié, an amateur archaeologist and the chancellor of the French consulate in Beirut. The sarcophagus was first described, and acquired by Honoré Théodoric d'Albert de Luynes, a French aristocrat who donated it to the French state. The sarcophagus of King Eshmunazar II is housed in the Louvre's Near Eastern antiquities section in room 311 of the Pavillon Sully. It was given the museum identification number AO 4806.

The inscriptions of the sarcophagus of Eshmunazar are written in the Phoenician language, in the Phoenician script. They identify the king buried inside, tell of his lineage and temple construction feats and warn against disturbing him in his repose. The inscriptions also state that the "Lord of Kings" (the Achaemenid King of Kings, probably Cambyses II) granted the Sidonian king "Dor and Joppa, the mighty lands of Dagon, which are in the Plain of Sharon" in recognition of his deeds. The deeds in question probably relate to the contribution of Eshmunazar to the Egyptian campaign of Cambyses II. Copies of the inscriptions were sent to scholars across the world, and well-known scholars of the time, including German orientalists Heinrich Ewald and Emil Rödiger, as well as the French orientalist Salomon Munk, published translations of them.

== Genealogy ==
Eshmunazar II was a descendant of Eshmunazar I's dynasty. Eshmunazar I's son Tabnit succeeded him. Tabnit had a child, Eshmunazar II, with his sister Amoashtart. Tabnit died before the birth of Eshmunazar II, and Amoashtart ruled in the interlude until the birth of her son, then was co-regent until he reached adulthood.

Eshmunazar I dynasty

Eshmunazar I
Tabnit I	Amoashtart	?
Eshmunazar II	Bodashtart
Yatonmilk

== See also ==
- King of Sidon – Ruler of Sidon
- Karatepe bilingual – Bilingual inscription on stone slabs

== Notes ==
Preceded by Tabnit I	King of Sidon c. 539–525 BC	Succeeded by Bodashtart
