= Baalshillem II =

4th-century BC Phoenician king of Sidon

King of Sidon
- Reign: c. 401 BC – c. 366 BC
- Predecessor: Baana
- Successor: Abdashtart I
- Phoenician language: 𐤁𐤏𐤋𐤔𐤋𐤌
- Dynasty: Baalshillem I dynasty
- Religion: Canaanite polytheism

Baalshillem II was a Phoenician King of Sidon (reigned c. 401 – c. 366 BC), and the great-grandson of Baalshillem I who founded the namesake dynasty. He succeeded Baana to the throne of Sidon, and was succeeded by his son Abdashtart I. The name Baalshillem means "recompense of Baal" in Phoenician.

During Baalshillem II's reign, Sidon was a Persian vassal kingdom, part of the Achaemenid Empire's dominion over Phoenicia. Under Achaemenid hegemony, Sidon resurged as a prominent city-state among its neighbors. The transition of the Sidonian monarchy from Eshmunazar I's dynasty to that of Baalshillem I coincided with Sidon independently issuing its coinage, featuring the likenesses of its reigning kings. Notably, Baalshillem II's coins, the first to bear minting dates corresponding to a Sidonian king's regnal year, have been instrumental in reconstructing the chronology of Sidonian kings. Baalshillem II's historical presence is substantiated by inscriptions, including one found on a votive statue depicting his son Abdashtart I.

== Etymology ==
The name Baalshillem (also Baalchillem) is the Romanized form of the Phoenician 𐤁𐤏𐤋𐤔𐤋𐤌 (bʿlšlm), meaning "recompense of Baal".

== Chronology ==
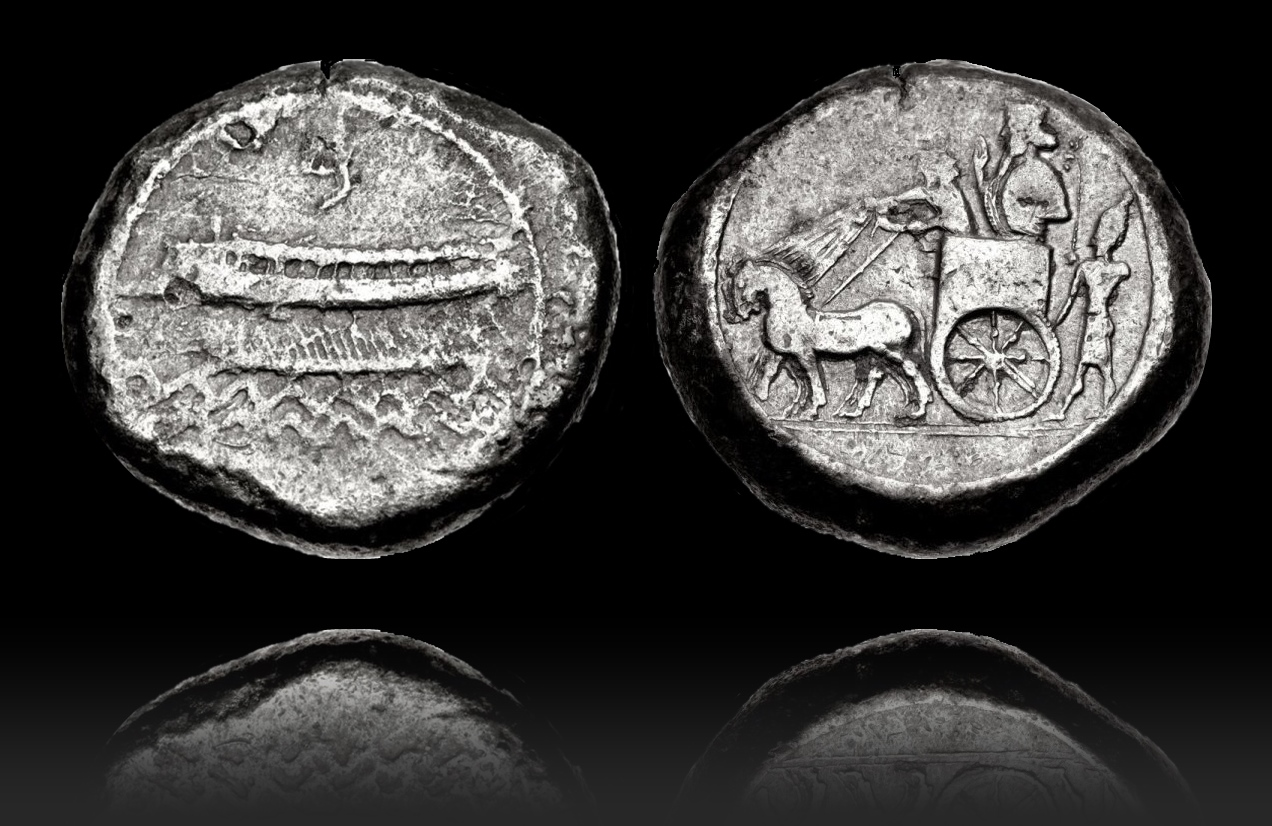
Baalshillem II coin, depicting a Phoenician galley and the letter B on the obverse, and a ritual procession on the reverse

The absolute chronology of the kings of Sidon from the dynasty of Eshmunazar I onward has been much discussed in the literature; traditionally placed in the course of the fifth century BC, inscriptions of this dynasty have been dated back to an earlier period on the basis of numismatic, historical and archaeological evidence. The most complete work addressing the dates of the reigns of these Sidonian kings is by the French historian Josette Elayi, who shifted away from the use of biblical chronology. Elayi used all available documentation of the time, including inscribed Tyrian seals and stamps excavated by the Lebanese archaeologist Maurice Chehab in 1972 from Jal el-Bahr, a neighborhood in the north of Tyre. She also used Phoenician inscriptions discovered by the French archaeologist Maurice Dunand in Sidon in 1965, and conducted a systematic study of Sidonian coins, the first coins to bear minting dates representing the years of Sidonian kings’ reigns.

Baalshillem II was the first among Sidonian monarchs to mint coins bearing issuing dates that correspond with his regnal year. Elayi established that Baalshillem II's year of accession was 401 BC and that he reigned until 366 BC. Baalshillem’s extant coins were issued in the thirtieth year of his reign. The dating of these coins is of considerable importance to scholars, since the subsequent reigns are dated yearly until Alexander's conquest of the Levant in 333 BC; this helped scholars to establish the chronology of Sidonian kings in retrospect.

== Historical context ==
In 539 BC, the Achaemenid Empire conquered Phoenicia, resulting in Sidon, Tyre, Byblos and Arwad becoming Persian vassal kingdoms. Eshmunazar I, a priest of Astarte and the founder of his namesake dynasty was enthroned King of Sidon around the time of the Achaemenid conquest of the Levant. During the first phase of Achaemenid rule, Sidon flourished and reclaimed its former standing as Phoenicia's chief city. In the mid 5th century BC, Eshmunazar's dynasty was succeeded by that of Baalshillem I; this dynastic change coincided with the time by which Sidon began to independently mint its own coinage bearing the images of its reigning kings.

== Epigraphic and numismatic sources ==
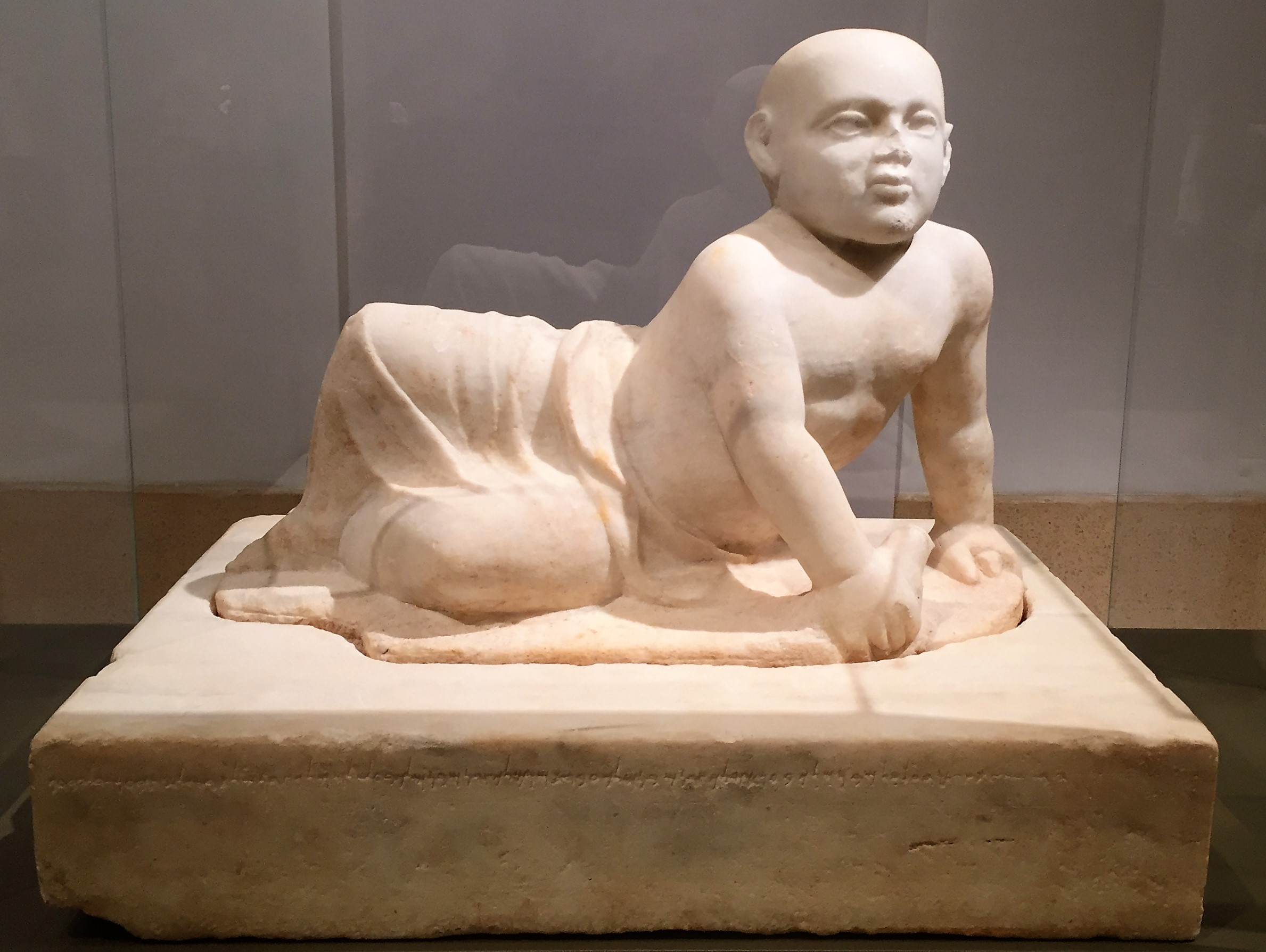
Baalshillem Temple Boy: a votive marble statue of a royal child, inscribed in Phoenician, from the Eshmun sanctuary, c. 400s BC

The name of Baalshillem II is known from a votive statue offered to Eshmun, the Phoenician god of healing, by the king himself. The base of the Baalshillem temple boy statue bears a Phoenician inscription known as KAI 281; it reads:

This (is the) statue that Baalshillem, son of King Ba'na, king of the Sidonians, son of King Abdamun, king of the Sidonians, son of King Baalshillem, king of the Sidonians, gave to his lord Eshmun at the "Ydll" Spring. May he bless him.

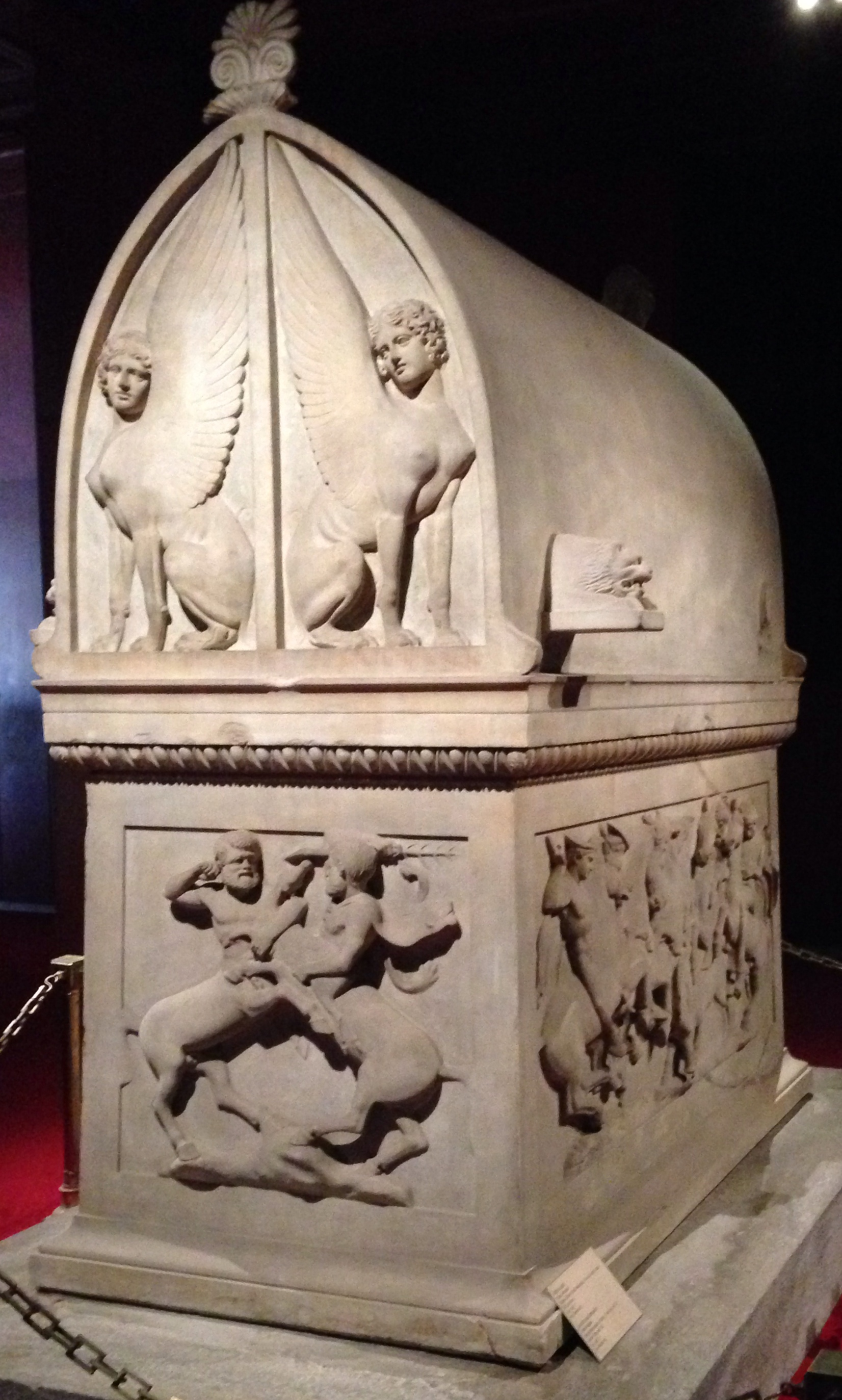
According to Elayi, the Lycian sarcophagus that was unearthed in the royal necropolis of Sidon, may have been made for Baalshillem II.

The statue is of note because its inscription provides the names of four kings of Sidon from the Baalshillem I dynasty. The statue also represents the young future king Abdashtart I, who may have been five or six months of age at the time of the dedication of the statue.

Baalshillem II is also known from the coins he struck under his reign. The coins dating from the reign of the Baalshillem I dynasty show the abbreviated names of the respective kings, a custom of the Sidonian royalty. King Baalshillem I's name is abbreviated as B, Abdamon's name is abbreviated as ʿB, Bʿ stands for Baana. Baalshillem II adopted the same abbreviation as his namesake predecessor, he modified however the iconography of the coins. The obverse of Baalshillem II's coins depicts a Sidonian trireme, while the obverse of the coins of Baalshillem I showed a galley in front of Sidonian wall fortifications. The reverse of Baalshillem II's coins shows a ritual procession. Another differentiating characteristic is the minting dates that Baalshillem II had engraved on his coins, and which correspond to the years of his reign. In a later series of Baalshillem II coins, the king emphasized his son's legitimacy as heir by inscribing the first letter of the latter's name on the reverse ("ʿ" for his son Abdashtart) in addition to the abbreviation of his own name on the obverse.

In a passage of the Oxyrhyncus manuscripts, relating the events of the 398 BC Battle of Cnidus, the leader of the Sidonian fleet is named in the papyrus as Sakton. Sakton was identified with Baalshillem II, who in 398 was in his fourth year of reign. The Greek name Sakton is interpreted as "Shipowner".

== Sarcophagus ==
According to Elayi, the Lycian sarcophagus unearthed in the royal necropolis of Sidon and dated to c. 390–380 BC, may have been made for Baalshillem II.

== Genealogy ==
Baalshillem II was a descendant of Baalshillem I's dynasty; his heir was his son Abdashtart I.

Baalshillem I dynasty

Baalshillem I
Abdamon
Baana
Baalshillem II
Abdashtart I

== See also ==
- King of Sidon – A list of the ancient rulers of the city of Sidon

== Bibliography ==
- Boardman, John; Hammond, Nicholas Geoffrey Lemprière; Lewis, David Malcolm; Ostwald, Martin (1998). The Cambridge Ancient History: Persia, Greece and the Western Mediterranean c.525 to 479 B.C. Vol. 4. Cambridge: Cambridge University Press. ISBN 9780521228046.
- Bonnet, Corinne (2017). "Cartographier les mondes divins à partir des épithètes : prémisses et ambitions d'un projet de recherche européen (ERC Advanced Grant)" [Mapping divine worlds from epithets: premises and ambitions of a European research project (ERC Advanced Grant)]. Rivista di studi fenici (in French). XLV. Archived from the original on 8 September 2023.
- Chéhab, Maurice (1983). "Découvertes phéniciennes au Liban" [Phoenician discoveries in Lebanon]. Atti del I congresso internazionale di studi Fenici e Punici [Proceedings of the first International Congress of Phoenician and Punic studies] (in French).
- Dunand, Maurice (1965). "Nouvelles inscriptions phéniciennes du temple d'Echmoun, près Sidon" [New Phoenician inscriptions from the temple of Echmoun, near Sidon]. Bulletin du Musée de Beyrouth (in French). 18. Ministère de la Culture – Direction Générale des Antiquités (Liban): 105–109.
- Elayi, Josette; Elayi, A. G. (2004). Le monnayage de la cité phénicienne de Sidon à l'époque perse (Ve-IVe s. av. J.-C.): Texte [The coinage of the Phoenician city of Sidon in the Persian era (V–IV s. av. J.-C.): Text] (in French). Paris: Gabalda. ISBN 9782850211584.
- Elayi, Josette (2006). "An updated chronology of the reigns of Phoenician kings during the Persian period (539–333 BCE)" (PDF). Digitorient. Collège de France – UMR7912. Archived from the original (PDF) on 30 July 2020.
- Elayi, Josette (2007). "Gerashtart, King of the Phoenician City of Arwad in the 4th century BC". The Numismatic Chronicle. 167: 99–104. ISSN 0078-2696. JSTOR 42666933.
- Elayi, Josette (2010). "An Unexpected Archaeological Treasure: The Phoenician Quarters in Beirut City Center". Near Eastern Archaeology. 73 (2–3): 156–168. doi:10.1086/nea25754044. ISSN 1094-2076.
- Elayi, Josette (2018a). The History of Phoenicia. Atlanta, Georgia: Lockwood Press. ISBN 9781937040819.
- Gibson, John Clark Love (1982). Textbook of Syrian Semitic inscriptions. Vol. 3. Oxford: Clarendon Press. ISBN 9780198131991.
- Greenfield, Jonas C. (1985). "A Group of Phoenician City Seals". Israel Exploration Journal. 35 (2/3). Israel Exploration Society: 129–134. ISSN 0021-2059. JSTOR 27925980.
- Ingraham, Holly (1997). People's Names: A Cross-cultural Reference Guide to the Proper Use of Over 40,000 Personal and Familial Names in Over 100 Cultures. McFarland & Company. ISBN 978-0-7864-0187-1.
- Kaoukabani, Ibrahim (2005). "Les estampilles phénicienne de Tyr" [The Phoenician stamps of Tyre] (PDF). Archaeology & History in the Lebanon (in French) (21). AHL: 3–79.
- Markoe, Glenn (2000). Phoenicians. Berkeley: University of California Press. ISBN 9780520226142.
- Pritchard, James B.; Fleming, Daniel E. (2011). The Ancient Near East: An Anthology of Texts and Pictures. Princeton: Princeton University Press. ISBN 9780691147260.
- Vance, Donald R. (1994). "Literary Sources for the History of Palestine and Syria: The Phœnician Inscriptions,". The Biblical Archaeologist. 57 (1): 2–19. doi:10.2307/3210392. ISSN 0006-0895.
- Vanel, Antoine (1967). "Six ostraca phéniciens trouvés au temple d'Echmoun, près de Saïda". Bulletin du Musée de Beyrouth (in French) (XX). Beirut: Musée National de Beyrouth: 45–95.
- Xella, Paolo; López, José-Ángel Zamora (2005a). "L'inscription phénicienne de Bodashtart in situ à Bustān eš-Šēḫ (Sidon) et son apport à l'histoire du sanctuaire". Zeitschrift des Deutschen Palästina-Vereins. 121 (2): 119–129. ISSN 0012-1169.
- Xella, Paolo; López, José-Ángel Zamora (2005b). "Nouveaux documents phéniciens du sanctuaire d'Eshmoun à Bustan esh-Sheikh (Sidon)" [New Phoenician documents from the sanctuary of Eshmun in Bustan esh-Sheikh (Sidon)]. In Arruda, A. M. (ed.). Atti del VI congresso internazionale di studi Fenici e Punici [Proceedings of the 6th International Congress of Phoenician and Punic studies] (in French). Lisbon: Gregorian Biblical Press. pp. 100–114.
- Zamora, José-Ángel (2016). "Autres rois, autre temple: la dynastie d'Eshmounazor et le sanctuaire extra-urbain de Eshmoun à Sidon" [Other kings, other temple: the dynasty of Eshmunazor and the extra-urban sanctuary of Eshmun in Sidon]. In Russo Tagliente, Alfonsina; Guarneri, Francesca (eds.). Santuari mediterranei tra Oriente e Occidente : interazioni e contatti culturali : atti del Convegno internazionale, Civitavecchia – Roma 2014 [Mediterranean sanctuaries between East and West: interactions and cultural contacts: Proceedings of the International Conference, Civitavecchia–Rome 2014] (in French). Rome: Scienze e lettere. pp. 253–262. ISBN 9788866870975.

Preceded by Baana	King of Sidon c. 401– c. 366 BC	Succeeded by Abdashtart I
