= Tennes =

4th-century BC Phoenician king of Sidon

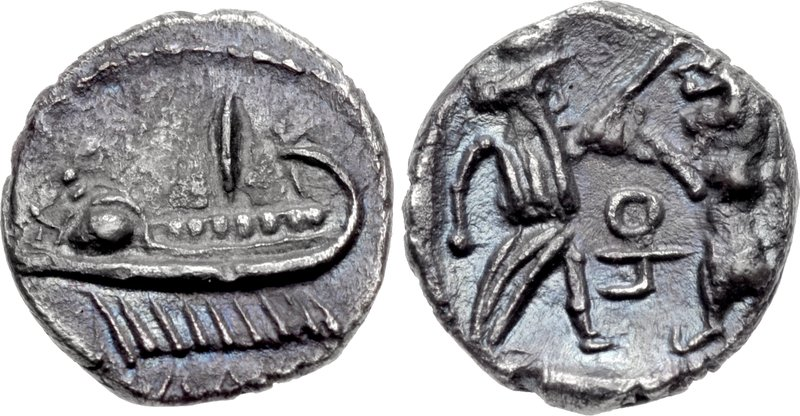
- Coinage of Sidon, dated 351/0 BC. Phoenician pentekonter sailing left. Date above (here faint), waves below. King of Persia standing right, holding up lion by lock of mane; Aramaic letters taw and ayin between.

King of Sidon
- Reign: c. 351 BC – c. 346 BC
- Predecessor: Abdashtart I
- Successor: Evagoras II

The capital of Tennes was Sidon.

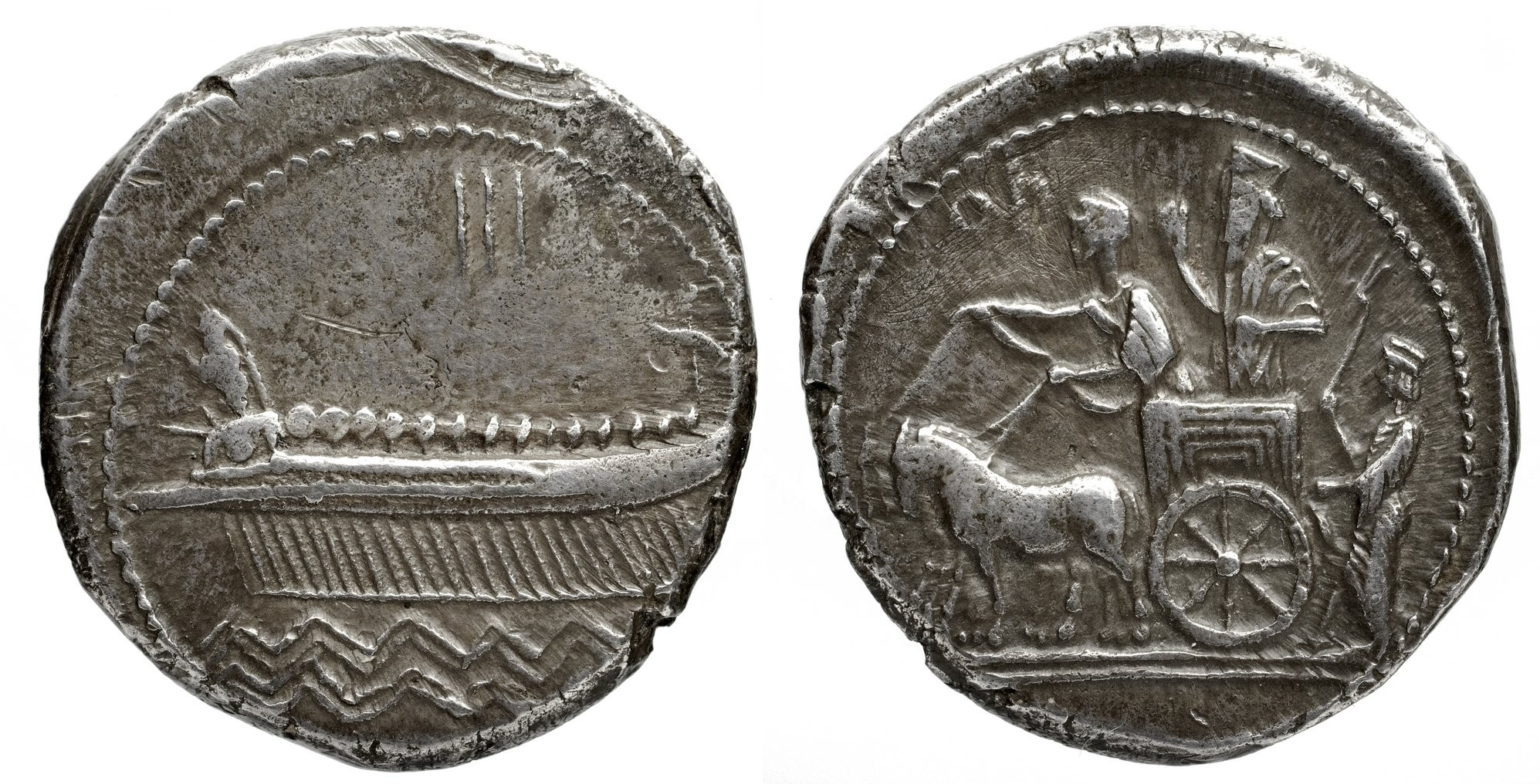
Coin of Tennes. Tennes can be seen walking behind the Achaemenid king on his carriage.

Tennes (Ancient Greek: Τέννης; Tabnit II in the Phoenician language) was a King of Sidon under the Achaemenid Empire, who ruled the Phoenician city-state of Sidon from (r. c. 351 – c. 346 BC), having been associated in power by his father since the 380s. It remains uncertain whether his known heir and successor, Tennes, was his son or some other close relative. His predecessor was Abdashtart I (in Greek, Straton I), the son of Baalshillem II

== Rebellion of Sidon against the Achaemenid Empire ==
Soon after the failure of the Egyptian campaign of the Achaemenid ruler Artaxerxes III, the Phoenicians declared their independence from Persian rule. This was also followed by rulers of Anatolia and Cyprus. Artaxerxes initiated a counter-offensive against Sidon by commanding the satrap of Syria Belesys II and Mazaeus, the satrap of Cilicia, to invade the city and to keep the Phoenicians in check. Both satraps suffered crushing defeats at the hands of Tennes, who was aided by 4,000 Greek mercenaries sent to him by Nectanebo II and commanded by Mentor of Rhodes. As a result, the Persian forces were driven out of Phoenicia.

After this, Artaxerxes personally led an army of 330,000 men against Sidon. Artaxerxes' army comprised 300,000 foot soldiers, 30,000 cavalry, 300 triremes, and 500 transports or provision ships. After gathering this army, he sought assistance from the Greeks. Though refused aid by Athens and Sparta, he succeeded in obtaining a thousand Theban heavily armed hoplites under Lacrates, three thousand Argives under Nicostratus, and six thousand Æolians, Ionians, and Dorians from the Greek cities of Anatolia. This Greek support was numerically small, amounting to no more than 10,000 men, but it formed, together with the Greek mercenaries from Egypt who went over to him afterwards, the force on which he placed his chief reliance, and to which the ultimate success of his expedition was mainly due.

The approach of Artaxerxes sufficiently weakened the resolution of Tennes that he endeavoured to purchase his own pardon by delivering up 100 principal citizens of Sidon into the hands of the Persian king, and then admitting Artaxerxes within the defences of the town. Artaxerxes had the 100 citizens transfixed with javelins, and when 500 more came out as supplicants to seek his mercy, Artaxerxes consigned them to the same fate. Sidon was then burnt to the ground, either by Artaxerxes or by the Sidonian citizens. Forty thousand people died in the conflagration. Artaxerxes sold the ruins at a high price to speculators, who calculated on reimbursing themselves by the treasures which they hoped to dig out from among the ashes.

Tennes was put to death by Artaxerxes III in 346-345 BC. Artaxerxes later sent Jews who supported the revolt to Hyrcania, on the south coast of the Caspian Sea.

== Bibliography ==
- Elayi, Josette (2006). "An updated chronology of the reigns of Phoenician kings during the Persian period (539–333 BCE)" (PDF). Digitorient. Collège de France – UMR7912. Archived from the original (PDF) on 2020-07-30.
