= Victory stele of Esarhaddon =

Assyrian stela

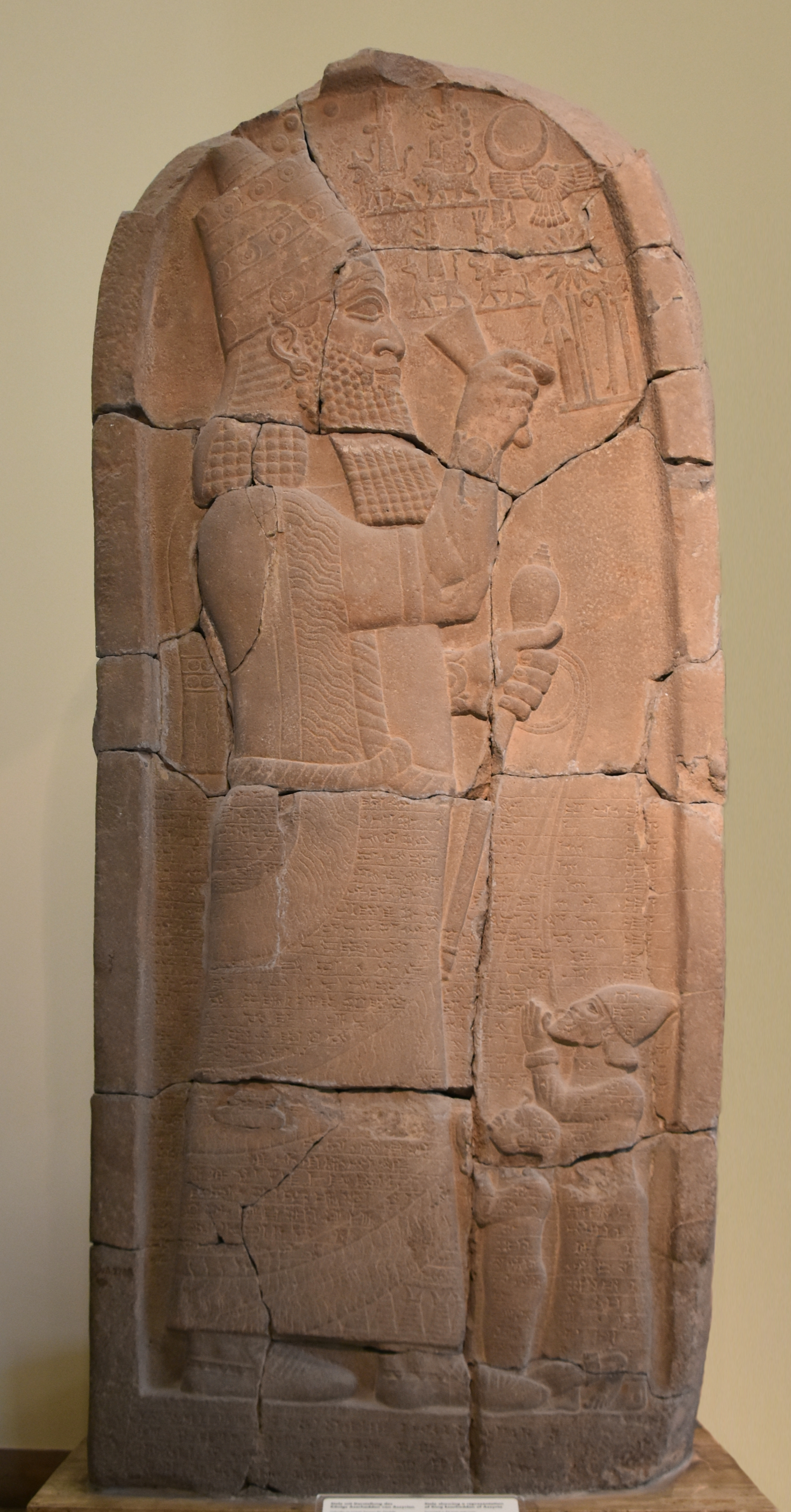
- The Victory Stele in its current location.
- Material: Dolerite
- Size: 3.46m x 1.35m
- Writing: Akkadian Cuneiform
- Created: c. 670 BC
- Discovered: 1888
- Present location: Pergamon Museum
- Identification: VA2708

The Victory stele of Esarhaddon (also Zenjirli or Zincirli stele) is a dolerite stele commemorating the return of Esarhaddon after his army's 2nd battle and victory over Pharaoh Taharqa in northern ancient Egypt in 671 BC. It was discovered in 1888 in Samʾal (or Yadiya) by Felix von Luschan and Robert Koldewey. It is now in the Pergamon Museum in Berlin.

The prior battle of 674 BC was won by Taharqa, who confronted Esarhaddon after his initial foray into the Levant; Esarhaddon then entered northern Egypt but was repulsed by Taharqa's forces.

The second battle of 671 BC saw Taharqa retreat with his army to Memphis; Memphis was taken with Taharqa then fleeing to the Kingdom of Kush. With Esarhaddon's victory he: "slaughtered the villagers and 'erected piles of their heads'", As Esarhaddon wrote later:

Memphis, his royal city, in half a day, with mines, tunnels, assaults, I besieged, I captured, I destroyed, I devastated, I burned with fire. His queen, his harem, [Prince] Ushankhuru his heir, and the rest of his sons and daughters, his property and his goods, his horses, his cattle, his sheep in countless numbers, I carried off to Assyria. The root of Kush I tore up out of Egypt.

== Description ==
The stele shows Esarhaddon standing on the left in an honorific pose. He is holding a mace club in his left hand, together with a rope ending in a ring that passes through the lips of the two conquered kings kneeling before him. His right hand is addressing the gods. Cuneiform script covers the entire medium bas relief scene.

The identity of the unnamed supplicant before him has been matter of debate. He may be the king of Tyre Baal I, mentioned in Esarhaddon's Treaty with Ba'al of Tyre, or the king of Sidon Abdi-Milkutti. The kneeling figure between the two is prince Ushankhuru with a rope tied around his neck; others deem it to be Pharaoh Taharqa himself, as he is wearing the uraeus tiara of Egyptian rule.

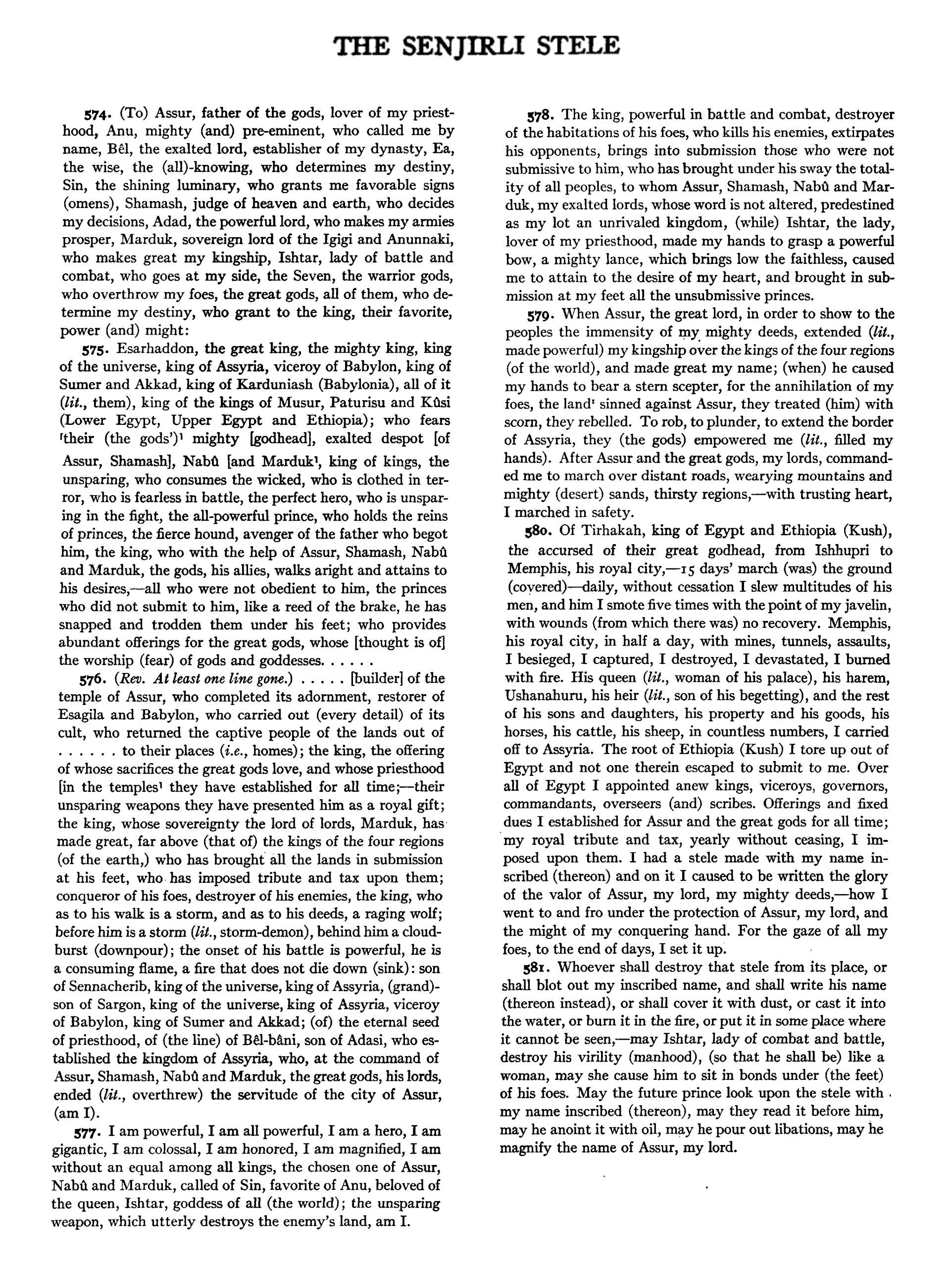
The Senjirli Victory Stele of Esarhaddon (English Translation)

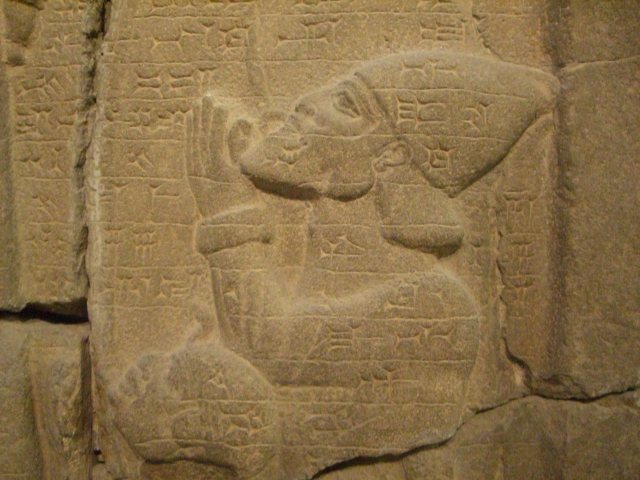
Closeup of the supplicant ruler

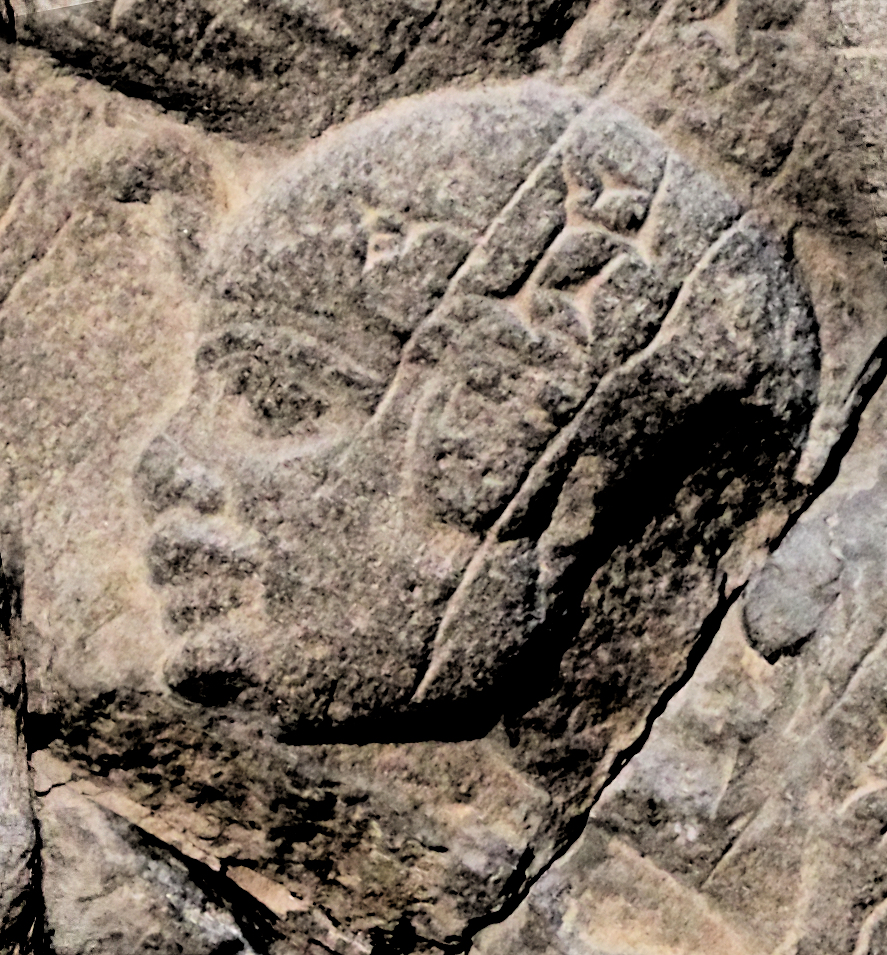
Ushankhuru, the captive son of Taharqa, as depicted by the Assyrians on the Victory stele of Esarhaddon
