= Abdashtart I =

4th-century BC Phoenician king of Sidon

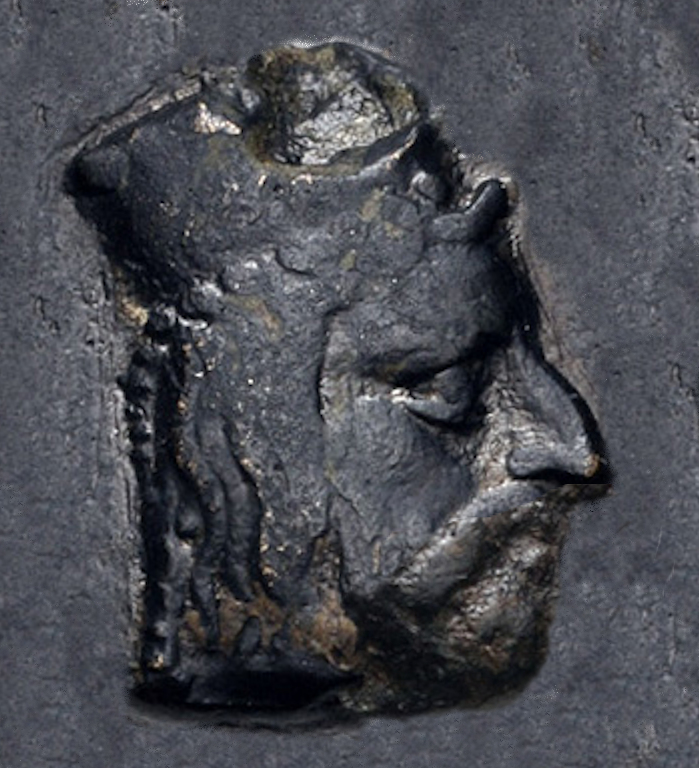
- Portrait of Abdashtart ("Straton") I from his coinage, c. 365–352 BC

King of Sidon
- Reign: c. 365 BC – c. 352 BC
- Predecessor: Baalshillem II
- Successor: Tennes
- Dynasty: Baalshillem I dynasty
- Religion: Canaanite polytheism

The capital of Abdashtart I was in Sidon.

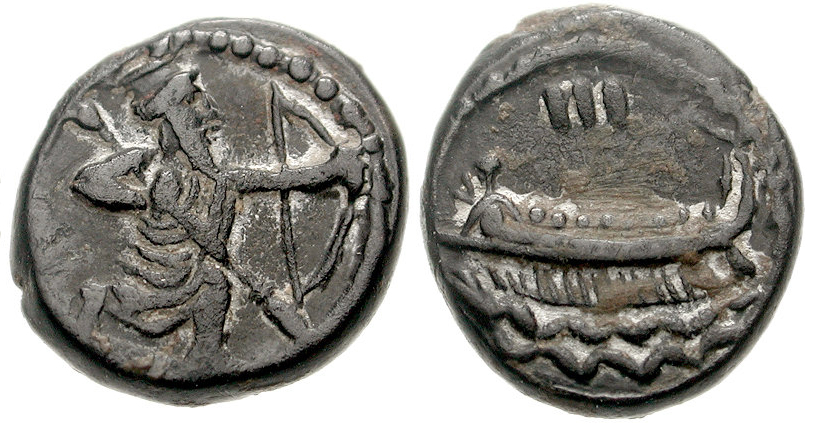
Achaemenid coinage of Abdashtart I, circa 365–352 BC.

Abdashtart I (in Greek: Straton I) was a king of the Phoenician city-state of Sidon who reigned from 365 BC to 352 BC following the death of his father, Baalshillem II.

== Reform ==
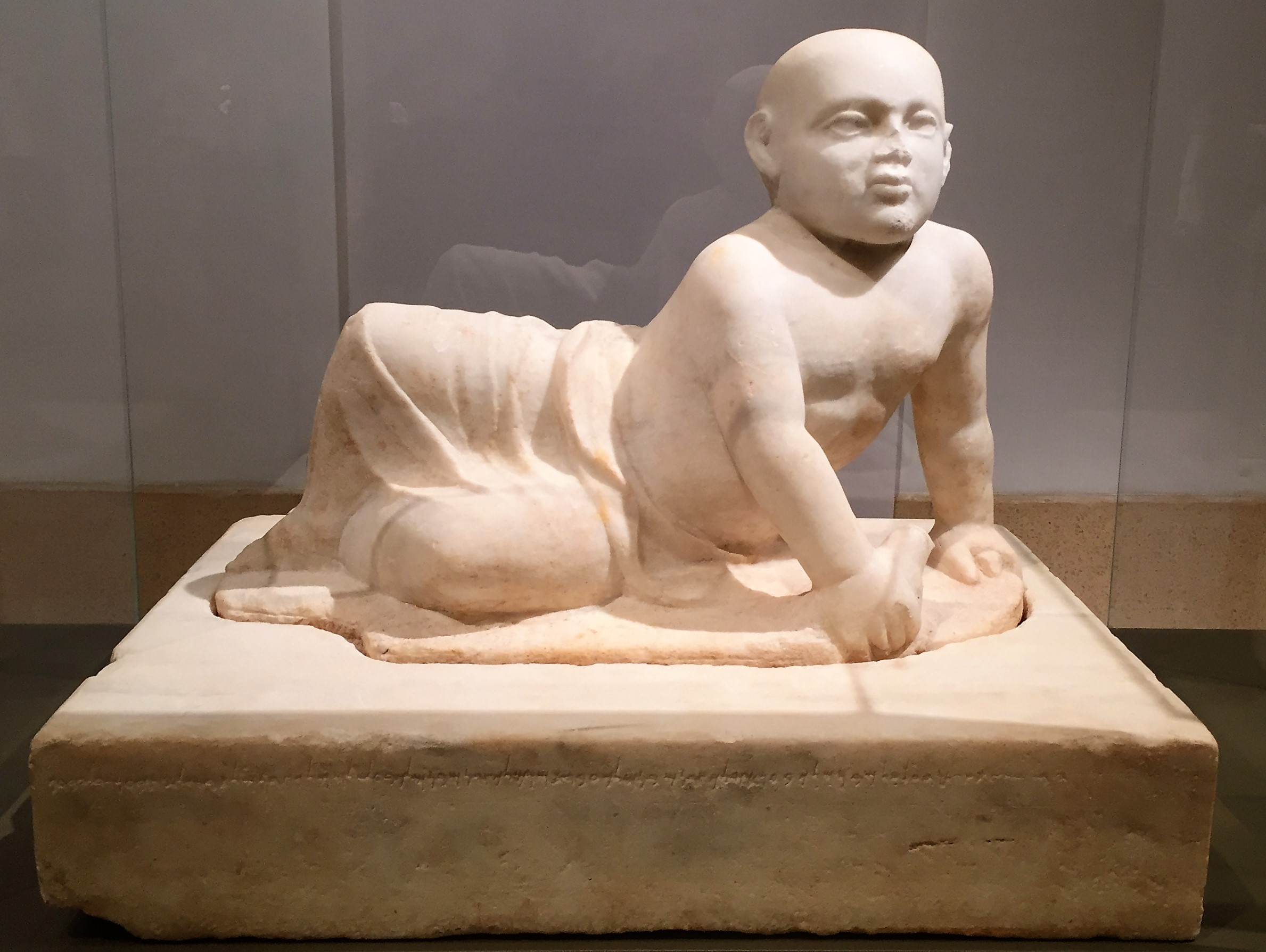
The Baalshillem Temple Boy – a votive statue said to depict Abdashtart I, given by his father Baalshillem II at the Temple of Eshmun.

His accession appears to have taken place in a period of economic and political difficulty, since he immediately took 'emergency measures', reducing the precious metal-content of the Sidonian double shekel by 2 grams (0.071 oz), thereby devaluing the Sidonian currency in his first year. He also expanded the currency, adding bronze coinage as well as silver, which funded the expansion of the Sidonian navy. It is supposed that he gave his name to the city known in the Hellenized world as Straton's Tower, which was later renamed Caesarea by Herod the Great. Joseph Patrich argues, however, that Straton's Tower may have been founded during the Ptolemaic Kingdom instead, in which case the naming may have been for a Ptolemaic general of the third century BC.

== Revolt against the Achaemenid Empire ==
Abdashtart formed diplomatic alliances with Athens and Egypt. Relying on his increased fleet, by 360 BC or 359 BC he felt strong enough to revolt against the Achaemenid Empire. Although the Persians were already fighting the Egyptians (whose Pharaoh Tachos had invaded Phoenicia), and although the rebels won two military victories against the generals of Artaxerxes III in 358 BC and 356 BC, the revolt was suppressed in 355 BC and led to Persian occupation for the next four years, during which time the Sidonian currency was banned, minting privileges were stopped, and the Persian currency was forcibly introduced. The revolt has been described as 'a grave political error' for Abdashtart; not only did the Sidonians experience financial crisis and military repression, but they also lost swathes of territory to their neighbour, Tyre.

== Later life ==
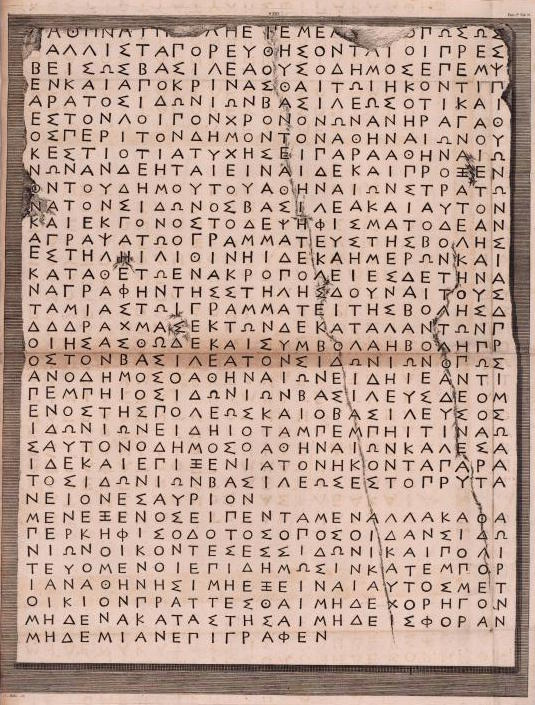
Inscription in honour of Straton, Acropolis of Athens.

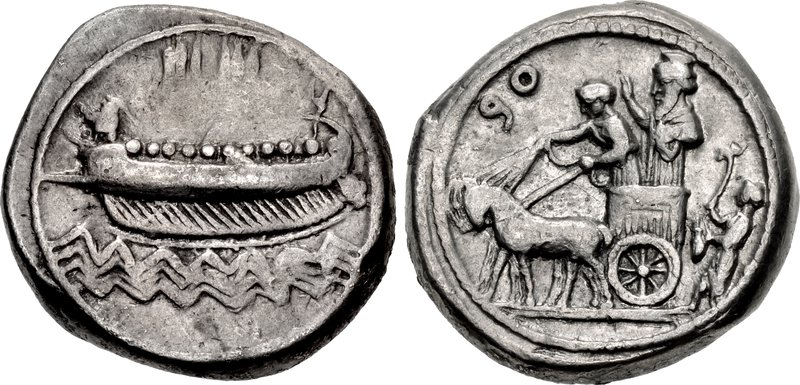
Coin struck in Sidon, Achaemenid Phoenicia, at the time of Abdashtart I. Obv: Phoenician galley and waves. Rev: King of Persia and driver in chariot drawn by two horses. Ruler of Sidon standing behind the chariot, holding sceptre and votive vase. Dated 360/59 BC.

The Persians left Abdashtart on the throne, and he proceeded to further diplomatic ties with Athens and Salamis, Cyprus, which had probably supported his revolt against Artaxerxes. Historians do not know whether he was the last of his dynasty, as it remains uncertain whether his known heir and successor, Tennes, was his son or some other close relative.

Abdashtart was honoured by an inscription in the Acropolis of Athens (IG II^{2} 141):

...and has taken care that the ambassadors whom the People sent to the King should travel as finely as possible, and to reply to the man who has come from the king of Sidon that, if in the future he is a good man to the People of Athens, he will not fail to obtain from the Athenians what he needs. Also Straton the king of Sidon shall be proxenos of the People of Athens, both himself and his descendants...

— Straton King of Sidon inscription, Acropolis of Athens (extract). Translation by Stephen Lambert, P. J. Rhodes.

== Bibliography ==
- Elayi, Josette (2006). "An updated chronology of the reigns of Phoenician kings during the Persian period (539–333 BCE)" (PDF). Digitorient. Collège de France – UMR7912. Archived from the original (PDF) on 2020-07-30.
