= Baalshillem Temple Boy =

5th-century BC Phoenician votive statue

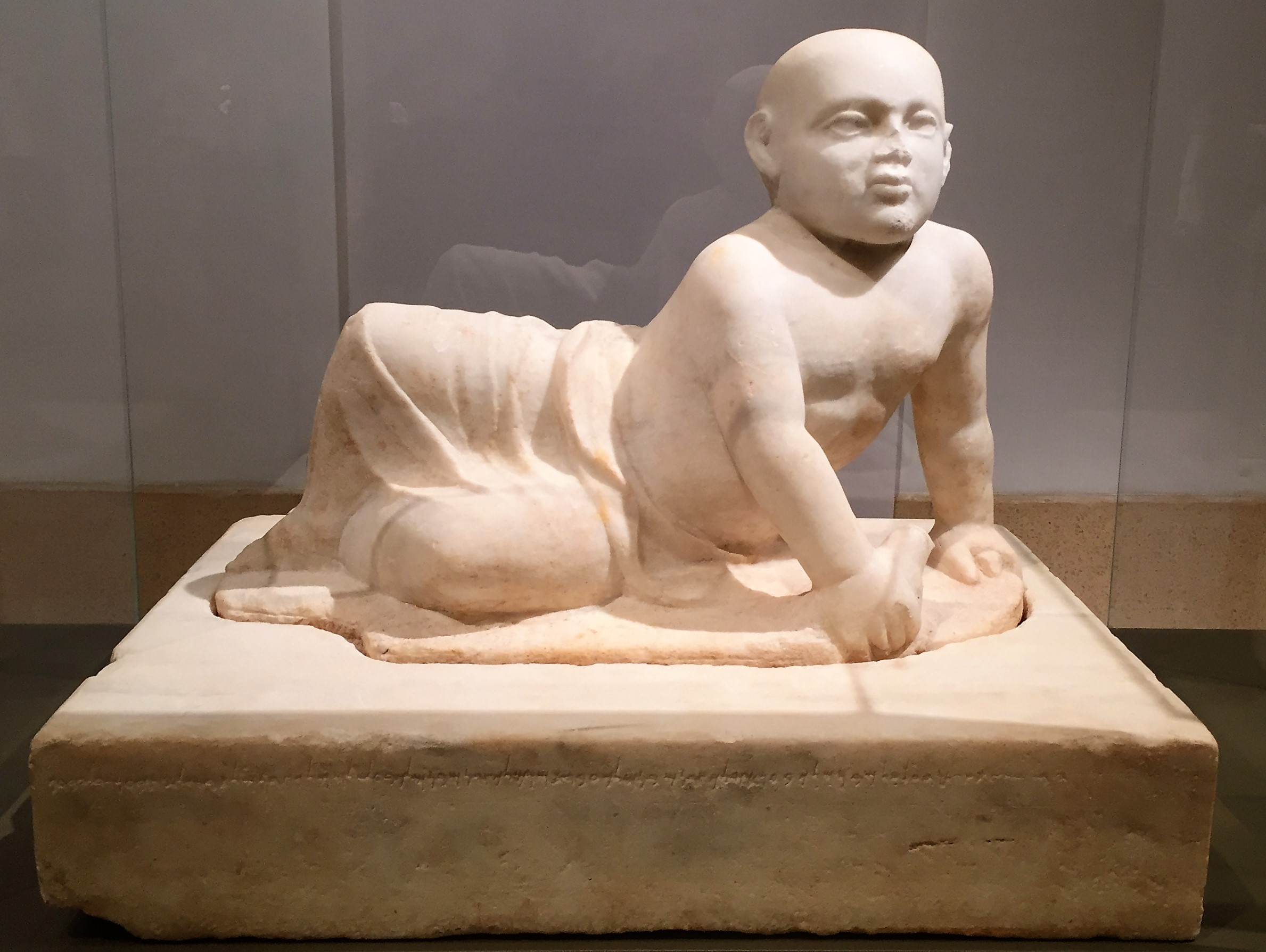
The statue in the Beirut National Museum, with the inscription shown on the plinth

The Baalshillem Temple Boy, or Ba'al Sillem Temple Boy, is a votive statue of a "temple boy" with a Phoenician inscription known as KAI 281. It was found along with a number of other votive statues of children near the canal in the Temple of Eshmun in 1963-64 by Maurice Dunand, and is currently in the National Museum of Beirut.

The base of the statue was found separately; as late as 1974 Everett Mullen wrote that: "Only the base of the inscription was found; it has a large cavity at the top where the image of the squatting child would be expected on analogy with the other images which were found alongside this inscription."

The inscription mentions four previously unknown names of Kings of Sidon, which correspond exactly with those from known Sidonian coins. The inscription has been translated as follows:

This (is the) statue that Baalshillem, son of King Ba'na, king of the Sidonians, son of King Abdamun, king of the Sidonians, son of King Baalshillem, king of the Sidonians, gave to his lord Eshmun at the YDLL spring. May he bless him.

The inscription is dated from the end of the 5th century BCE. Nothing else is known about the kings mentioned in the inscription.

According to Josette Elayi, the statue represents Abdashtart I, who was the son of Baalshillem II. The statue is 35cm high.
