= Tetramnestos =

5th-century BC Phoenician king

Tetramnestos (ruled c. 480 – 479 BCE) was, according to Herodotus, a King of Sidon who assisted the Achaemenid Emperor Xerxes I in the Second Persian invasion of Greece in 480 BCE. Specifically, he is said to have served as the chief advisor of Xerxes in naval matters. In effect, the Sidon fleet held a position of primacy among the naval forces of the Achaemenid Empire at that time, providing the best ships in the fleet, superior even to the fleet of Artemisia of Halicarnassus. The Phoenicians furnished a fleet of 300 ships, "together with the Syrians of Palestine".
