= List of monarchs of Sidon =

Ruler of Sidon

The Monarchs of Sidon were the rulers of Sidon, an ancient Phoenician city in what is now Lebanon.

Scholars have pieced together the fragmented list from various archaeological finds since the 19th century.

== Egyptian period ==
- c.1700s BC Zimrida
- c. 1300s BC Zimredda of Sidon / Zimrida II
- c. 1300s BC Iab-nilud
- 13th century BC Addumu

== Assyrian period ==
- 680–677 BC Abdi-Milkutti

== Persian period ==
=== Eshmunazar Dynasty ===
- c. 575–550 BC Eshmunazar I
- c. 549–539 BC Tabnit I
- c. 539–525 BC Eshmunazar II; Amoashtart (Amastoreth, interregnum until Eshmunazar's majority)
- c. 525–515 BC Bodashtart
- c. 515–486 BC Yatonmilk
- c. 486–480 BC Anysos
- c. 480–479 BC Tetramnestos.

=== Baalshillem Dynasty ===
- c. 450–426 BC Baalshillem I
- c. 425–? BC Abdamon
- c. ?–401 BC Baana
- c. 401–366 BC Baalshillem II (Sakton)
- c. 365–352 BC Abdashtart I
- c. 351–347 BC Tennes (Tabnit II)
- c. 346–343 BC Evagoras II
- c. 342–333 BC Abdashtart II

== Hellenic period ==
- c. 332–312 BC Abdalonymus
- c. 286–279 BC Philocles

== See also ==
- King of Tyre
- King of Byblos
