= Abdi-Milkutti =

Phoenician king of Sidon (7th century BC)

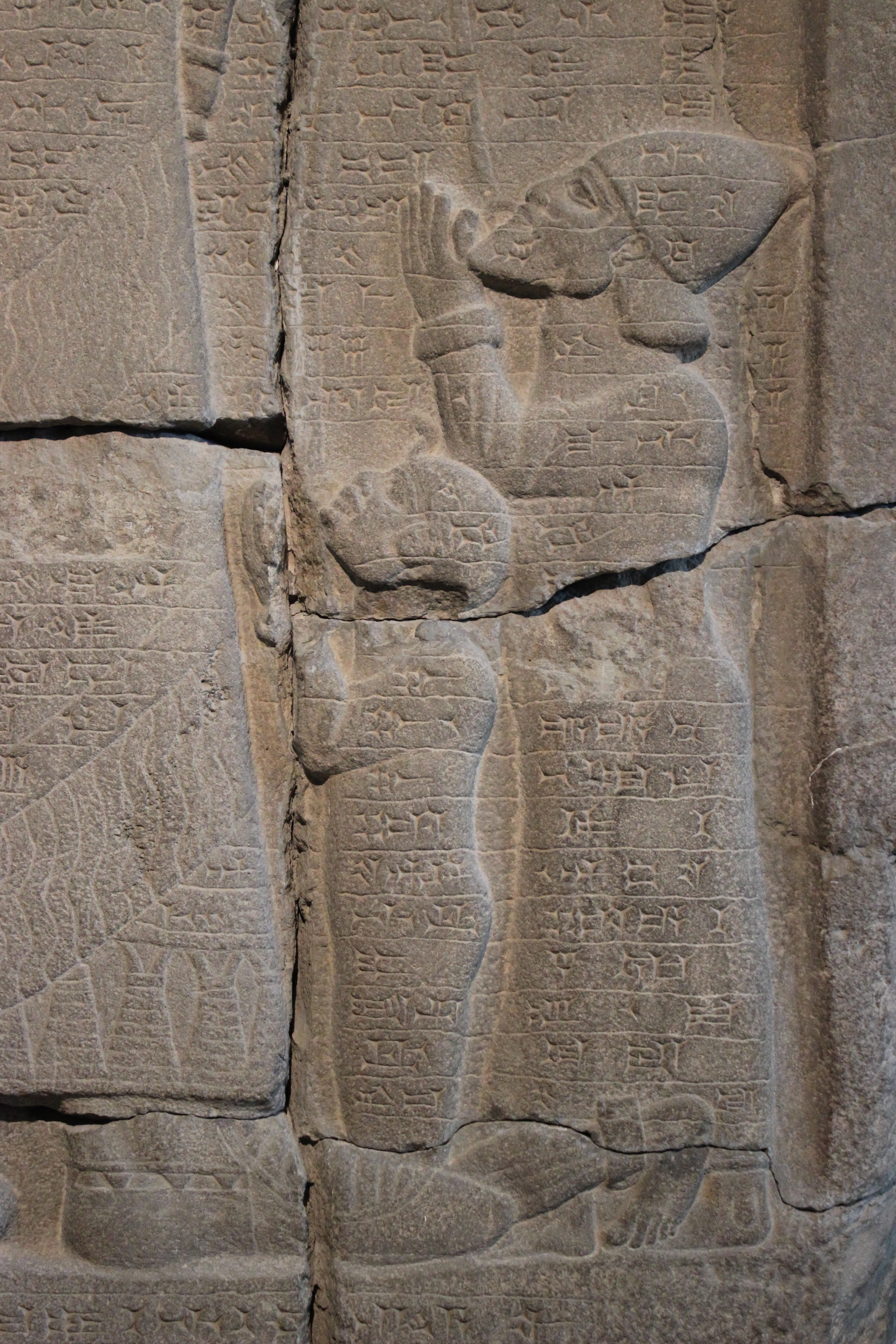
Detail from the Victory stele of Esarhaddon. The standing figure may depict Abdi-Milkutti in bounds, or alternatively the king of Tyre Baal I.

The capital of Tabnit was Sidon.

Abdi-Milkutti (Phoenician: 𐤏𐤁𐤃𐤌𐤋𐤊𐤕, romanized: ʿAbd-milkōt) was a King of Sidon (reigned ca. 680-677 BC) who rose up against Assyrian rule. He had formed an alliance with Sanduarri, king of Kundi and Sizu, a prince of the Lebanon, probably during the time of the civil war waged between Esarhaddon and two of his brothers who disputed his succession after they had murdered his father. The two kings had sworn to each other by the names of the great gods and revolted. As soon as this struggle was over, in response to the rebellion, Esarhaddon laid siege to Sidon, which after three years of siege, in 677 BC, was finally captured, destroyed and rebuilt as Kar-Ashur-aha-iddina, the Harbour of Esarhaddon. The Sidonian king was decapitated. Sanduarri was also captured and decapitated and the heads of the two kings were hung around the necks of their nobles who were paraded through the streets of Nineveh. Part of the treasure taken from Sidon went to the loyal king of the rival city Tyre.

In his annals the Assyrian king states that he conquered Sidon and “tore up and cast into the sea its walls and its foundations.” This city was situated on a promontory jutting into the sea. The Sidonian king Abdi-Milkutti tried to escape by boat, but was “pulled out of the sea like a fish“ by the Assyrian king who cut off his head. Esarhaddon sent off to Assyria a rich treasure, including: “gold, silver, precious stones, elephant hides, ivory, maple and boxwood, garments of brightly colored wool and linen.” He also took away the king’s wife, his children, and his courtiers: “His people from far and near, which were countless.”

On the month of Tašrîtu the head of the king of Sidon was cut off and conveyed to Assyria.

The defeated and executed king of Sidon was depicted on the Sam'al Victory stele of Esarhaddon from Zenjirli. The stele shows Abdi-Milkutti, dressed in his native costume and held with a coiled leash. Although he is shown standing with his hands raised, he reaches only to about Esarhaddon's knee. Next to him is shown a kneeling Egyptian prince. He may be prince Ushankhuru, son of the Egyptian Pharaoh Taharqa with a rope tied around his neck; others deem the kneeling figure to be Pharaoh Taharqa himself, as he is wearing the uraeus tiara of Egyptian rule.

== Sources ==
- Gzella, Holger (2011). "Phoenician". In Gzella, Holger (ed.). Languages from the World of the Bible. Berlin, Germany: Walter de Gruyter. pp. 55–75. doi:10.1515/9781934078631.111. ISBN 978-1-934-07863-1.
