= Esarhaddon's Treaty with Ba'al of Tyre =

7th century BC treaty

Esarhaddon's Treaty with Ba'al
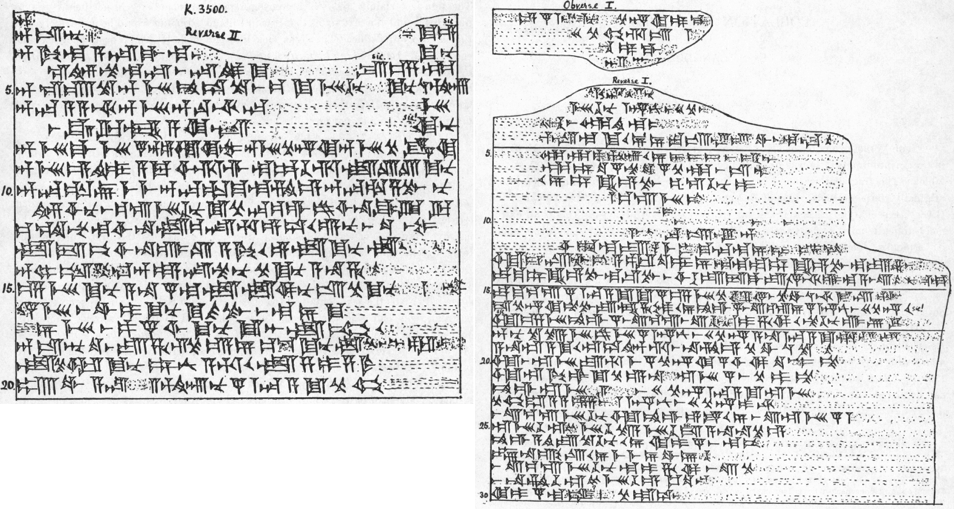
- The transliterated text of K3500
- Material: Clay
- Writing: Akkadian cuneiform
- Created: c. 675 BC
- Discovered: Mid 19th century. Combined identification in 1898
- Present location: British Museum
- Identification: K 3500 + K 4444 + K 10235

Esarhaddon's Treaty with Ba'al is an Assyrian clay tablet inscription describing a treaty between Esarhaddon (reigned 681 to 669 BC) and Ba'al of Tyre. It was found in the Library of Ashurbanipal.

== 19th-century publication ==
The first fragment published, K 3500, was published in the mid-nineteenth century. It was identified as a combined tablet by Hugo Winckler in his Altorientalische Forschungen, II ("Ancient Near Eastern Studies") in 1898.

== Terms ==
The treaty was part of a large two-column tablet containing an account of Esarhaddon's conquest of Eber Nari. Under the terms of the treaty, Esarhaddon entrusted Baal with several settlements, including Akko, Dor, and Byblos.

== Agreement over the fate of shipwrecks ==
The third column has received the most focus from scholars. The text is below:

Esarhaddon, king of Assyria, these cities which... The royal deputy whom I have appointed over you, ... the elders of your country, ... the royal deputy ... with them ... the ships ... do not listen to him, do not ... without the royal deputy; nor must you open a letter which I send you without the presence of the royal deputy. If the royal deputy is absent, wait for him and then open it, do not... If a ship of Ba'al or of the people of Tyre (KUR.ṣur-ri) is shipwrecked off the coast of the land of Pilistu (KUR.pi-lis-ti) or anywhere on the borders of Assyrian territory, everything that is on the ship belongs to Esarhaddon, king of Assyria, but one must not do any harm to any person on board ship, they should list their names and inform the king of Assyria... These are the ports of trade and the trade roads which Esarhaddon, king of Assyria, granted to his servant Ba'al; toward Akko (URU.a-ku-u), Dor (URU.du-uʾ-ri), in the entire district of Pilistu (KUR.pi-lis-te), and in all the cities within Assyrian territory, on the seacoast, and in Byblos (URU.gu-ub-lu), across the Lebanon (KUR.lab-na-[na]), all the cities in the mountains, all the cities of Esarhaddon, king of Assyria, which Esarhaddon, king of Assyria gave to Ba'al ..., to the people of Tyre (KUR.ṣur-ri), in their ships or all those who cross over, in the towns of Ba'al, his towns, his manors, his wharves, which ..., to ..., as many as lie in the outlying regions, as in the past ... they..., nobody should harm their ships. Inland, in his district, in his manors...

== List of curses ==
As with all Assyrian treaties, they end with a list of curses if they are violated, the fourth column:

…

May Gula, the great physician, put illness and weariness in your hearts, an unhealing sore in your body, bathe in your own blood as if in water.

…

May Bethel and Anath-Bethel deliver you to a man-eating lion.

May the great gods of heaven and earth, the gods of Assyria, the gods of Akkad, and the gods of Eber-Nari curse you with an indissoluble curse.

May Ba'al-šamem, Ba'al-Malage and Ba'al-Saphon raise an evil wind against your ships, to undo their moorings, tear out their mooring pole, may a strong wave sink them in the sea, a violent tide … against you.

May Melqart and Eshmun deliver your land to destruction, your people to be deported; from your land

…

May they make food to disappear from your mouth and clothes from your body, oil for your ointment.

May Astarte break your bow in the thick of battle, and have you crouch at the feet of your enemy, may a foreign enemy divide your belongings.

== Deuteronomic Code ==
Scholars have argued that the covenant structure and the curse warnings given in the Book of Deuteronomy, are modelled after Neo-Assyrian "vasal treaties" or "loyalty oaths", but the covenant is instead between the people of Israel and Yahweh, rather than the kings of Judah and Esarhaddon, and with the authors of Deuteronomy 28 adding a list of blessings largely absent in the Assyrian treaties. Esarhaddon demanded of his vassals: "You will love Ashurbanipal, the crown-prince, son of Esarhaddon, king of Assyria, your lord, as you do your own life". Laura Quick has instead suggested the Sefire treaties, Tell Fakariyah inscriptions, and Bukan stele, which are all written in Aramaic, as providing closer parallels, and Deuteronomy uses both Akkadian and local Northwest Semitic "futility curse" traditions.
