= Baal I =

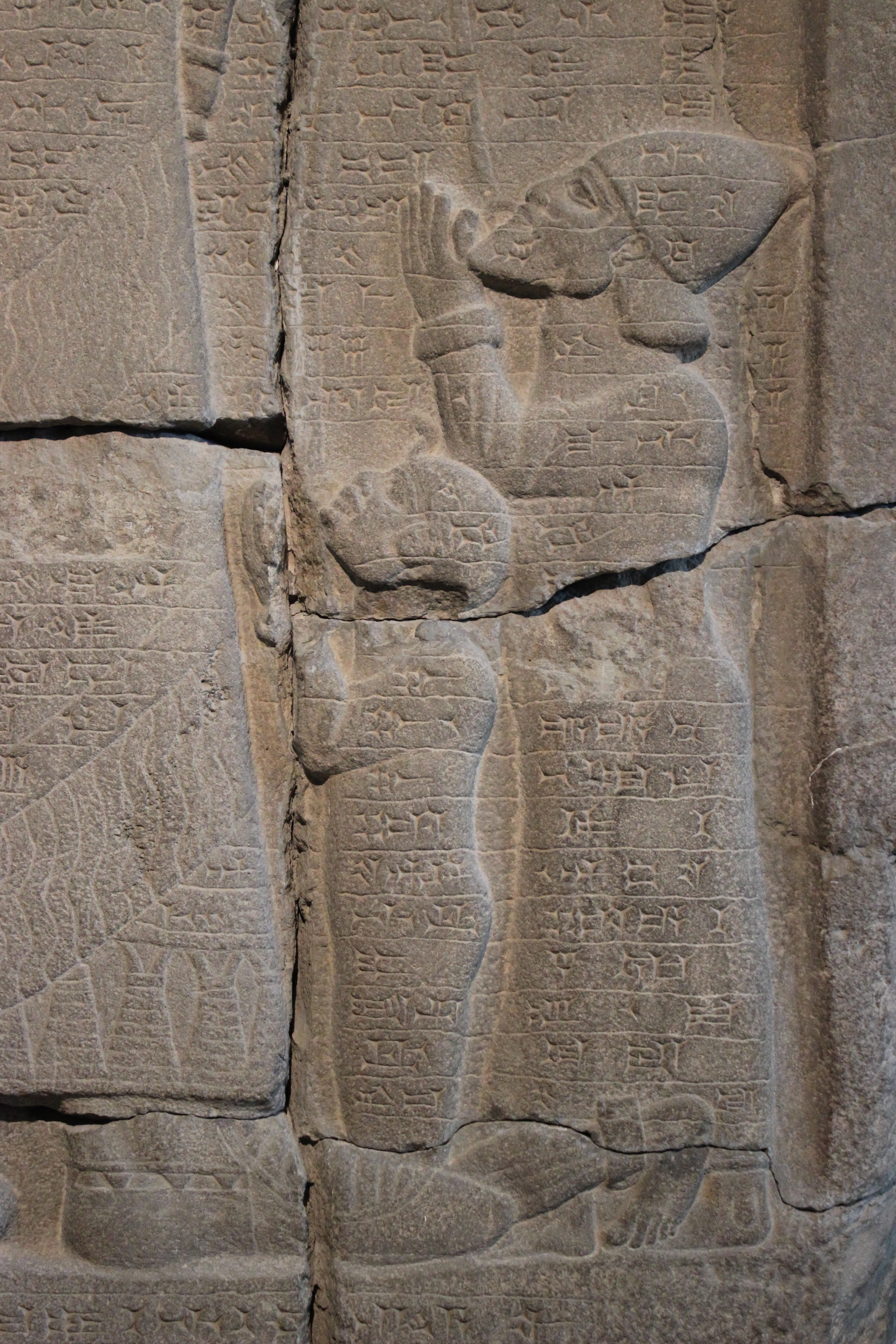
Closeup of the supplicant ruler (right) who may be Baal I, from the Victory stele of Esarhaddon.

Baal I was a king of Tyre (680–660 BC). His name is the same as that of the Phoenician deity, Baal. He was tributary to the Assyrians, who had conquered the rest of Phoenicia.

== Treaty with Esarhaddon ==
In c. 675 BC, Baal I entered into a vassal treaty with Esarhaddon (currently in the British Museum) in exchange for Tyre's trading rights. These two rulers are possibly depicted together on the Victory stele of Esarhaddon, issued in c. 670 BC. In the stele, which was erected to commemorate the defeat of Egypt, the figure that supposedly represents the Phoenician king was shown with pierced lips tied to strings that were coiled around Esarhaddon's left hand.

Sources noted that Baal I was a prominent vassal and may have enjoyed exceptional favor in Assyria due to several factors. His navy helped the Assyrians capture Abdi-Milkuti, the king of Sidon, and cement Assyrian authority in Cyprus. He may also have assisted the Assyrians in their war against Elam. Baal I was also the first ruler in the list of tributaries who provided materials for Esarhaddon's palace at Nineveh.

By 671, BC Baal I defied Assyria after it secured an alliance with Taharqo, king of Cush. Esarhaddon attacked Tyre and Baal I later capitulated, ceding most of his mainland towns. His daughters were sent to the Assyrian king along with substantial dowries. Scholars, however, cited that Esarhaddon failed to conquer Tyre. Baal I was never captured and he kept his throne. While Esarhaddon claimed in the Victory Stele that he conquered the city, he merely managed to blockade the island, cutting it from its supply of water and food.

== Ashurbanipal's reign ==
The king of Tyre was again cited in the inscriptions of Esarhaddon's son Ashurbanipal. He was first mentioned for his participation in the king's second campaign along the Delta and the Nile valley to establish the Assyrian domination in Egypt. The inscriptions recorded a later war with Baal I due to his relations with Egypt. The king may have also refused to pay tribute. In retaliation, Ashurbanipal blockaded the harbor of Tyre until Baal I surrendered. Ashurbanipal's account of the siege stated:

[Because] he did not honor my royal commands and did not obey the pronouncements from my lips, I set up blockades against him. To prevent his people from leaving, I reinforced its garrison. By sea and dry land, I took control of all of his routes and thus cut off all access to him.

Around 668, Baal I was cited paying tribute and sending naval assistance to Ashurbarnipal's campaign against Egypt. He also sent his son Yehawmelek to Ashurbanipal (r. 668–627 BC) with heavy tribute. According to Ashurbanipal's own account, Baal's son was later sent back as an act of mercy. Baal also enjoyed special rights and privileges even on the mainland, which some scholars suggested may have required a new treaty.

== See also ==
- List of Kings of Tyre
