= Maurice Chehab =

Lebanese archaeologist (1904–1994)

Emir Maurice Hafez Chehab (27 December 1904 – 24 December 1994) was a Lebanese archaeologist and museum curator. He was the head of the Antiquities Service in Lebanon and curator of the National Museum of Beirut from 1942 to 1982. He was recognised as the "father of modern Lebanese archaeology"

== Life ==
Chehab was a member of the Maronite branch of the prominent Chehab family, and related to Khaled Chehab (prime minister of Lebanon in 1938 and 1952–53) and Fuad Chehab (president of Lebanon from 1958 to 1964). He was born in Homs in Syria, where his father was a doctor, and French honorary consul. He returned to Beirut with his family in 1920, and was educated at Saint Joseph University in Beirut, studying philosophy and law. He obtained his baccalauréat in 1924, and then studied history in Paris, at the Sorbonne, the École pratique des Hautes Études, the Institut Catholique de Paris and finally as a graduate studied archaeology at the École du Louvre, receiving its diploma in 1928.

He returned to Beirut in 1928 and worked with the Institut Français d'Archéologie Orientale under the French Mandate. He worked at the nascent National Museum of Beirut from 1928 to 1942. He helped to organise the collection based on the personal collection of Raymond Weill. He also helped to ensure that the collection of George Ford, the Director of the American Mission School of Sidon, remained in Lebanon, and that new archaeological discoveries were kept in Lebanon, not exported.

The museum's building was completed by 1937, and opened by the President of the Lebanese Republic Alfred Naqqache on 27 May 1942. Chehab became head of the Antiquities Service in 1942, director in 1944, and then director general; he was also curator of the museum from 1942. He worked to establish the administrative structure of the Antiquities Service, with local inspectors. He remained its director until 1982. He was also a professor of history at the Lebanese University, teaching from 1945 to 1974.

Chehab's work focussed on the history of the Levant, from Ancient Egypt and Phoenicia, through Greek, Persian, Macedonian, Seleucid and Roman influence and occupation, to the Muslims and Crusaders in the Middle Ages, and the Ottoman Empire from the 16th century.

He supervised archaeological digs of ancient Tyre, and digs at Sidon with Maurice Dunand. He was involved with the restoration of the Ottoman Beiteddine Palace.

As the Lebanese Civil War escalated in 1976, Chehab organised the protection of the museum collections. The headquarters of the Directorate-General of Antiquities at the National Museum was situated in the heart of a battle zone, on the Green Line. Chehab ensured that smaller objects were stored safely in the basement, behind steel-reinforced concrete walls. Some objects hidden in the library on the second floor were destroyed in a fire caused by a rocket attack, with many bronzes objects melted and others badly burnt. The catalogues, card indexes, and photographic archives of the museum were destroyed. Other objects were moved to underground storage at Byblos Castle, or the vaults of the Central Bank of Lebanon, or the French Archaeological Institute in Damascus, although some were stolen. Heavier objects were encased in thick double layers of concrete in situ, including the Ahiram sarcophagus with the oldest known inscription in the Phoenician alphabet; mosaic floors were covered with plastic and then covered with concrete. He spread the rumour that the museum's objects had been sent abroad.

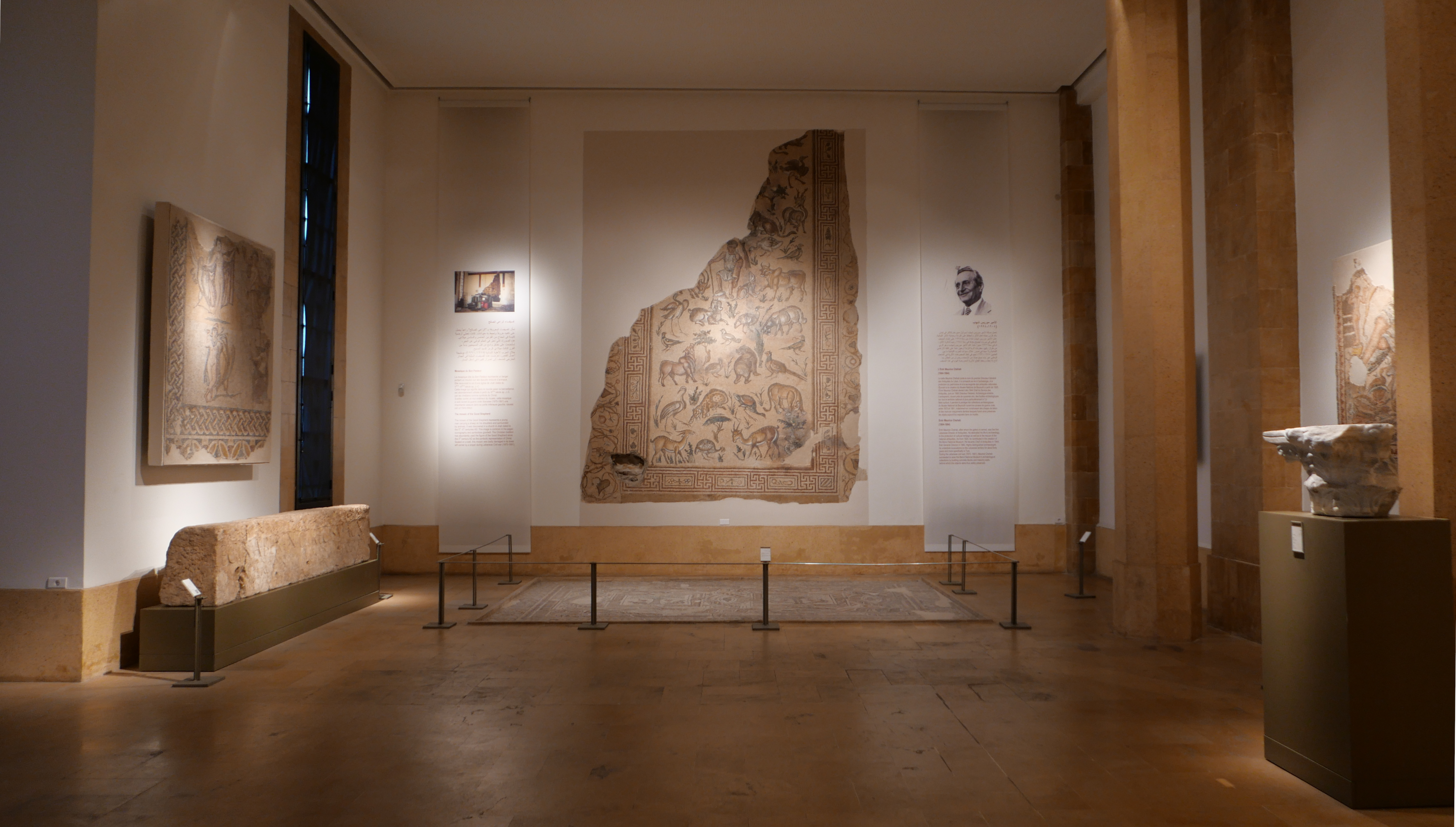
The Maurice Chehab gallery in the National Museum of Beirut

He established an archaeological journal in 1936, the "Bulletin du Musée de Beyrouth" (the "Bulletin of Beirut Museum") which reached 36 volumes before publication was stopped in 1986 by the civil war. He also published many books on the archaeology of Lebanon, on the Phoenicians and particularly on the archaeology of Tyre, and also on mosaics, the Romans and the Crusades.

He married Olga Chaiban in 1945. She was the daughter of the doctor to the Emperor of Ethiopia, Haile Selassie.

Chehab retired 1982. After peace returned to Lebanon in 1991, the museum was opened in 1993 in its damaged state, with bomb and bullet holes in the burnt and graffiti-clad walls. Chehab died in 1994, and did not live to see the museum reopen fully in 1999 after extensive reconstruction and restoration.

He was an officer of the French Légion d'honneur, the Ordre des Palmes Académiques, and the Ordre des Arts et des Lettres
