= Abdamon =

Phoenician king of Sidon (5th century BC)

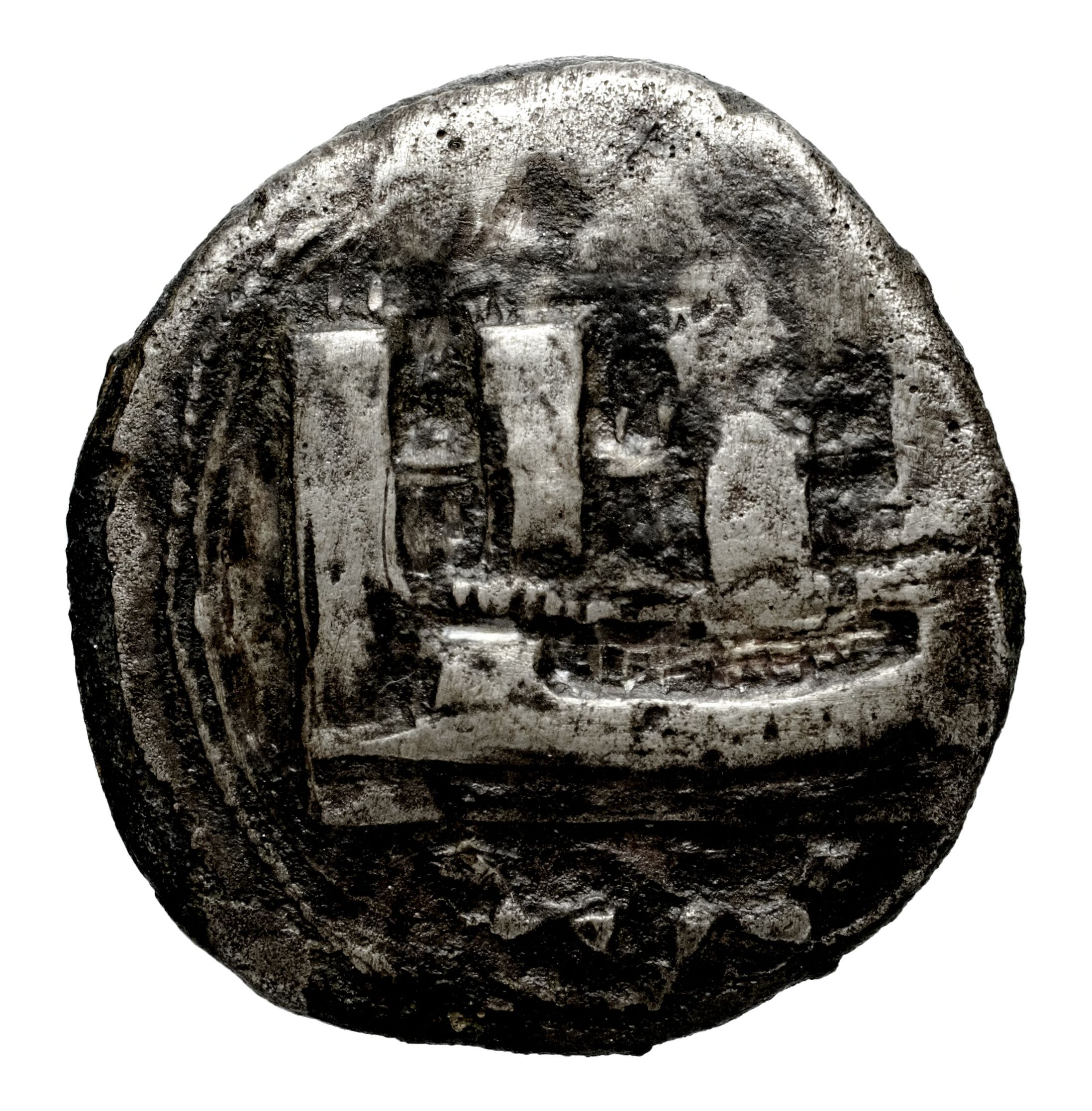
- A half Shekel of Abdamon

King of Sidon
- Reign: c. 425 BC – c. 402 BC
- Predecessor: Baalshillem I
- Successor: Baana
- Phoenician language: 𐤏𐤁𐤃𐤀𐤌𐤍
- Dynasty: Baalshillem I dynasty
- Religion: Canaanite polytheism

Abdamon (also transliterated Abdamun ; Phoenician: 𐤏𐤁𐤃𐤀𐤌𐤍, was a Phoenician King of Sidon (c. 425 – c. 402 BC), and a vassal of the Achaemenid Empire. He was succeeded by his son Baana to the throne of Sidon.

Preceded by ?	King of Sidon c. 450– c. 426BC	Succeeded by Baana
