= Maurice Dunand =

French archaeologist (1898–1987)

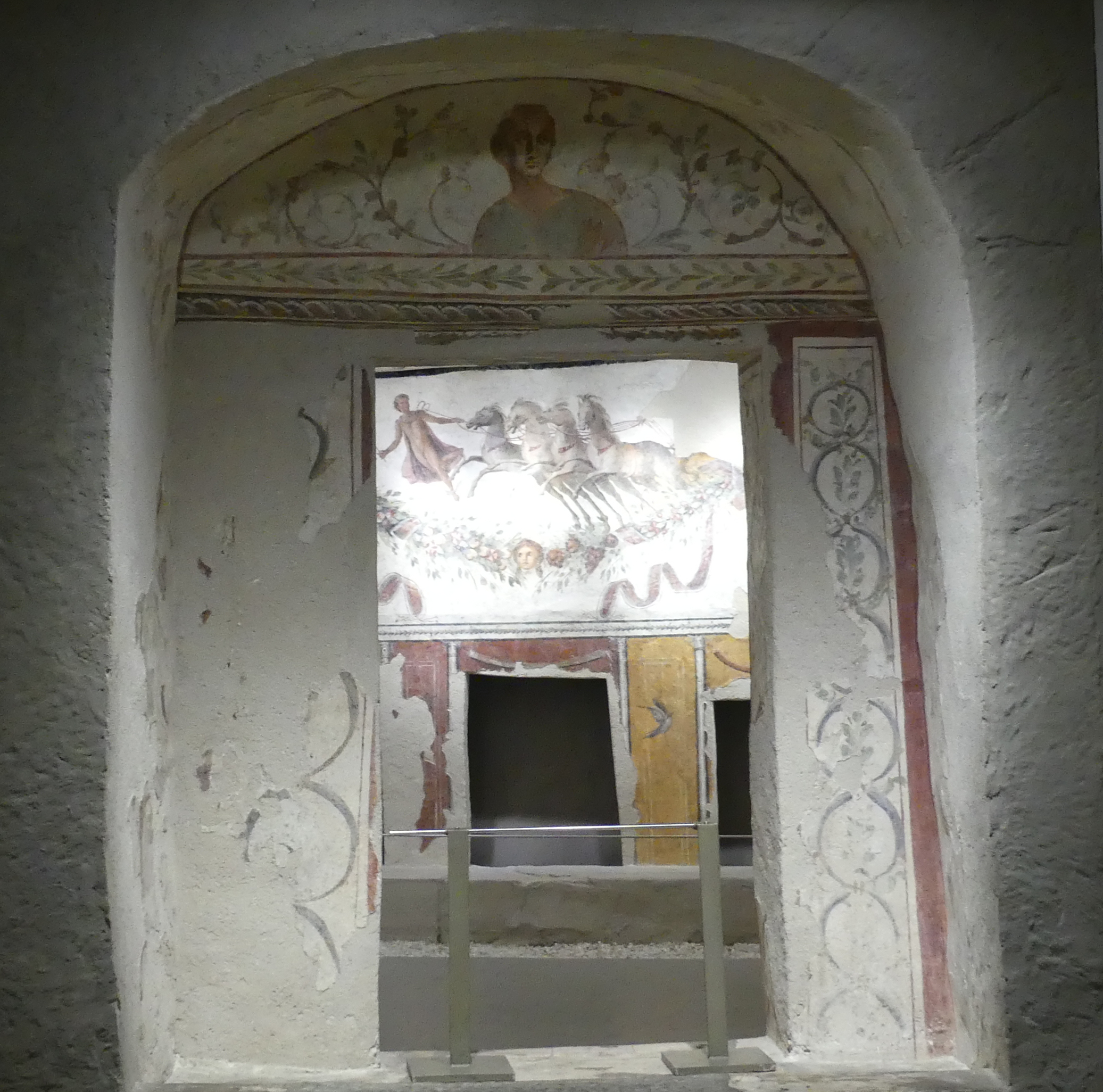
Roman tomb with frescoes, excavated in 1939 by Dunand in Burj el-Shemali and restored at the National Museum Beirut

Maurice Dunand (4 March 1898 – 23 March 1987) was a prominent French archaeologist specializing in the ancient Near East, who served as director of the Mission Archéologique Française in Lebanon. Dunand excavated Byblos from 1924 to 1975, and published a Byblos syllabary in his monograph Byblia Grammata in 1945. The Neolithic of Lebanon was divided by Dunand into three stages based on the stratified levels of Byblos. From 1963 onwards, Dunand also thoroughly excavated the site of the Temple of Eshmun near Sidon.

During the Lebanese Civil War Dunand left Lebanon, taking with him his archives, which he left to the University of Geneva, but which were returned to Lebanon in 2010.

Dunand was a native of Loisin, Haute-Savoie, France. He died there in retirement.

== Works ==
- Dunand, Maurice (1939). Fouilles de Byblos: Tome 1er, 1926-1932 [The Byblos excavations, Tome 1, 1926–1932]. Bibliothèque archéologique et historique (in French). Vol. 24. Paris: Librarie Orientaliste Paul Geuthner.
- Dunand, Maurice (1937). Fouilles de Byblos, Tome 1er, 1926–1932 (Atlas) [The Byblos excavations, Tome 1, 1926–1932 (Atlas)]. Bibliothèque archéologique et historique (in French). Vol. 24. Paris: Librarie Orientaliste Paul Geuthner.
- Dunand, Maurice (1945). Byblia grammata: documents et recherches sur le développement de l'écriture en Phénicie. Ministère de l'éducation, Liban. Êtudes et documents d'archéologie (in French). na.
