= Josette Elayi =

French ancient historian (born 1943)

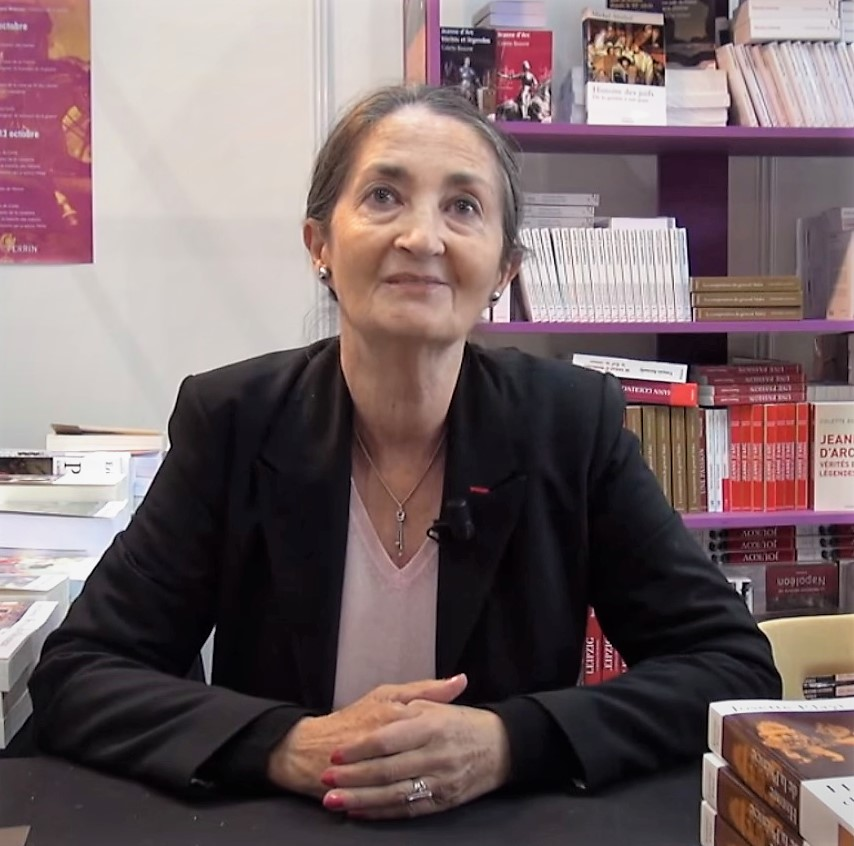
- Elayi in 2014
- Born: Josette Elayi; 29 March 1943 (age 83)
- Other name: Josette Elayi-Escaich
- Spouse: Alain Elayi
- Awards: Knight of the Legion d'honneur

Academic work
- Discipline: Ancient history
- Sub-discipline: Phoenician studies

Josette Elayi-Escaich (French pronunciation: [ʒozɛt əleji ɛskɛʃ]; born 29 March 1943) is a French ancient historian, specialising in Phoenician and Near-Eastern history. She is an honorary scholar at the French National Center for Scientific Research (CNRS). Elayi has authored numerous archaeology and history works, and literary novels. She is also a novelist and has campaigned for reform and activism against bias in CNRS research policy. In 2007 Elayi was made a Knight of the Legion of Honour by the French state.

== Early life and education ==
Josette Elayi (née Escaich) was born on 29 March 1943 in Les Bordes-sur-Lez, a small former commune now merged into Bordes-Uchentein in the Couserans (part of the Ariège department) in France's Pyrenees mountains. She studied in the nearby town of Saint-Girons. At the Saint-Girons high school, Elayi had an affinity for science and literature, but a skiing accident caused her to fall behind in science. Elayi recounts that "the literary course was much more rewarding than the sciences at the time". Elayi's parents wanted her to become a teacher, but after her baccalaureate, she went to Toulouse to study classical literature. Elayi is a holder of a Doctorat ès Lettres, the highest doctoral degree in France, and multiple other degrees in oriental languages from Lyon, Paris and Nancy universities.

== Work, research and academia ==
Elayi taught literature in Émilie de Rodat school in Toulouse between 1966 and 1968 before moving on to Notre-Dame school in Lyon where she taught for the next four years. In 1973, Elayi obtained a teaching position in the Lebanese University's faculty of letters in Beirut. Elayi's interest in the history of the Phoenicians was stirred during her short stay in Beirut. When the Lebanese civil war broke out in 1975, she moved to Baghdad where she taught French literature at Al-Mustansiriya University until 1978. She settled in Paris in 1980, where she taught at the Lycée Charlemagne before joining the CNRS as a researcher in ancient history in 1982.

Elayi is versed in fifteen modern and extinct languages. She has developed a multidisciplinary historiography method that combines epigraphy, numismatics, archaeology, economics and sociology; she applied this methodology in her works on the history of the Phoenicians. She writes regularly in journals and has received two prizes from the Académie des Inscriptions et Belles-Lettres, and a prize from the French Numismatic Society (Société française de numismatique).

=== Phoenician and Near-Eastern history studies ===
In 1982, when she was recruited by the CNRS as a senior researcher, Elayi found that her field of research, the history of ancient Phoenicia, was not included in university curricula; it was confined to the Oriental studies department which existed until 1991. Phoenician studies were then consigned to the department of Antiquity studies. The CNRS allowed Elayi full-time research and freedom to choose her subjects without teaching-hours constraints. In 1988 her relationship with the CNRS took a negative turn; faced with the lack of support of the committee, Elayi started her own research group, the Association for the research on Syria-Palestine in the Persian Period (ASPEP). ASPEP was embraced and supported by an international network of researchers and obtained public and private funding. Elayi also launched and directs a specialized international journal the Transeuphratène, and wrote a number of historical monographs about Phoenicia and the Ancient Near East. Elayi's work focuses on advancing research in the field of Phoenician history.

Her celebrated Trésors de monnaies phéniciennes et circulation monétaire (Ve-IVe siècles avant J.-C.) [Treasures of Phoenician coins and monetary circulation (5th-4th centuries B.C.)] showcases 75 Phoenician coin treasure troves, of which 20 were previously unpublished. The work highlights aspects of the economic and political history of Phoenician and ancient Near-Eastern cities in the 4th and 5th centuries BC; it delves into and adds new chronological data to the political and economic context of the first bronze coins production, circulation, control and production workshops. This research was followed up by her 2016 Phoenician Coinages, a body of knowledge completely dedicated to mainland Phoenicia numismatics under the Persian hegemony. (Note: Mainland Phoenicia is the area located around coastal modern Lebanon and parts of the Syrian littoral. Mainland cities included Sidon, Tyre, Byblos, and Arwad among others. Maeir, Philip (2 January 2016). "Phoenicia: Episodes and Anecdotes from the Ancient Mediterranean". Palestine Exploration Quarterly. 148 (1): 72–74. doi:10.1080/00310328.2016.1159418. ISSN 0031-0328. S2CID 163724122.) The book summarizes 59 monographs and journal articles written following over 30 years of research by Elayi, her spouse Alain-Gérard, and other contributing scholars; noting that Elayi and her spouse developed an original method for the metrological study of coins including distinguishing monetary standards or legal weight, from a manufactured standard.

== Literary work ==
Elayi has written a number of novels that draw inspiration from her real life experiences and contemporary issues. In 2009, she published her first novel Le survivant [The survivor] based on her experience of the civil war in Beirut. Two years later, Elayi wrote her second novel, Secrets de granite [Secrets of granite]; the book is inspired by her native Ariège region. L'ombre de Saddam [The shadow of Saddam] came out in 2015; the geopolitical thriller portrays Saddam Hussein before his seizure of power. Her 2017 Pourquoi je suis devenu un terroriste [Why I became a terrorist] came two years after the Paris terrorist attacks, it follows a Spanish student's descent into extremism. Elayi's 2018 novel Arwad, une île syrienne à la dérive [Arwad, a drifting Syrian island] draws parallels between the fall of the insular Phoenician city of Arwad and war-time Syria. In 2019 Elayi published Ange Garelli where the Corsican protagonist is haunted by the discovery of a secret linking him to Napoleon Bonaparte. In 2023 Josette Elayi published Le roi qui noya Babylone and Le voyage d'Archimède au 21e siècle with her husband, Alain-Gérard.

== Personal life ==
Elayi is married to Alain-Gérard Elayi, a Lebanese nuclear scientist; they have two children together.

== Personal views and activism ==
Elayi had a contentious relationship with the CNRS, criticizing what she perceived as corporatism, ambiguity, and bias in its evaluation processes for French research. She raised concerns about errors in the recruitment and promotion of researchers and teams, which she argued negatively affected the quality of French research, particularly during the 2002 and 2003 budget cuts that led to reduced funding and worsening working conditions for researchers. She advocated for reforms, addressing these issues in media outlets and through two books where she proposed a more equitable distribution of resources based on evaluations of researchers' competencies. Elayi was consulted by successive research ministers in an effort to create the Agency for the Evaluation of Research and Higher education which saw the light in 2007. Elayi is a vocal defender of the teaching of classical languages, which was threatened by curriculum reforms spearheaded by then-Minister of National education and research Najat Vallaud-Belkacem. The reforms proposed to replace Latin and Greek classes by an "initiation to ancient languages" course within the French courses, and to integrate the teaching of these two languages within the French literature courses. Elayi criticized the lack of a timetable, a program, funding or continuity and expressed indignation that teaching of classical languages would be left to non-specialized teachers and to the discretion of headmasters. Despite nation-wide polemic the bill was passed in August 2016.

== Awards and distinctions ==
In 1995 the Académie des Inscriptions et Belles Lettres awarded Elayi with the Gregor Mendel prize for her work on coin economy and circulation in Phoenicia and the Ancient Near-East in the 5th and 4th centuries BC. (Note: Elayi, Josette (1943- ) Auteur du texte; Elayi, Alain G. Auteur du texte (1993). Trésors de monnaies phéniciennes et circulation monétaire : Ve-IVe siècles avant J.-C. / J. Elayi et A. G. Elayi.) Six years later, the academy awarded Elayi and Hussein Sayegh with the Adolphe Noël des Vergers prize for their research on the Phoenician port quarter of Beirut. In 2001, she received the Babut Prize from the French Numismatic Society for her research on ancient coins. In 2007 Elayi was decorated Knight of the Legion of Honor by then Minister of superior education François Goulard for her work on Phoenician history.

== Works ==
The WorldCat database lists more than 200 publications by Josette Elayi in her various fields of expertise; she has authored more than 44 books and is the editor of seventy one books.

This following is a list of her most widely held publications:

- Elayi, Josette (2024). L'Empire babylonien, entre haine et fascination (in French). Perrin. ISBN 978-2-262-09951-0. OCLC 1043306368.
- Elayi, Josette (2023). Esarhaddon, King of Assyria. Lockwood Press. ISBN 978-1-957 454-97-9. OCLC 1043306367.
- Elayi, Josette (2021). L'Empire assyrien. Histoire d'une grande civilisation de l'Antiquité (in French). Perrin. ISBN 978-2-262-07667-2. OCLC 1043306368.
- Elayi, Josette (2018). Sennacherib, King of Assyria. SBL Press. ISBN 978-0-88414-318-5. OCLC 1043306367.
- Elayi, Josette (2018). The history of Phoenicia. Lockwood Press. ISBN 978-1-937040-82-6. OCLC 1037944871.
- Elayi, Josette (2017). Sargon II, King of Assyria. SBL Press. ISBN 978-0-88414-223-2. OCLC 975999230.
- Elayi, Josette; Elayi, A. G (2014). A monetary and political history of the Phoenician city of Byblos in the fifth and fourth centuries B.C.E. Pennsylvania State University Press. ISBN 978-1-57506-304-1. OCLC 879033985.
- Elayi, Josette; Elayi, A. G (2015). Arwad, cité phénicienne du nord (in French). Peeters Publishers & Booksellers. ISBN 978-2-85021-240-6. OCLC 910179498.
- Elayi, Josette; Elayi, A. G (2009). The coinage of the Phoenician city of Tyre in the Persian period (5th-4th cent. BCE). Leuven; Walpole, MA: Peeters. ISBN 978-90-429-2202-0. OCLC 476143018.
- Elayi, Josette (2005). ʻAbdʻaštart Ier, Straton de Sidon: un roi phénicien entre Orient et Occident (in French). Paris: Gabalda. OCLC 61189974.
- Elayi, Josette; Elayi, A. G (1997). Recherches sur les poids phéniciens (in French). Paris: Gabalda. ISBN 978-2-85021-102-7. OCLC 38333231.
