= Temple of Eshmun =

Ancient temple to the Phoenician god of healing in Lebanon

- 𐤁𐤕 𐤀𐤔𐤌𐤍 (Phoenician)
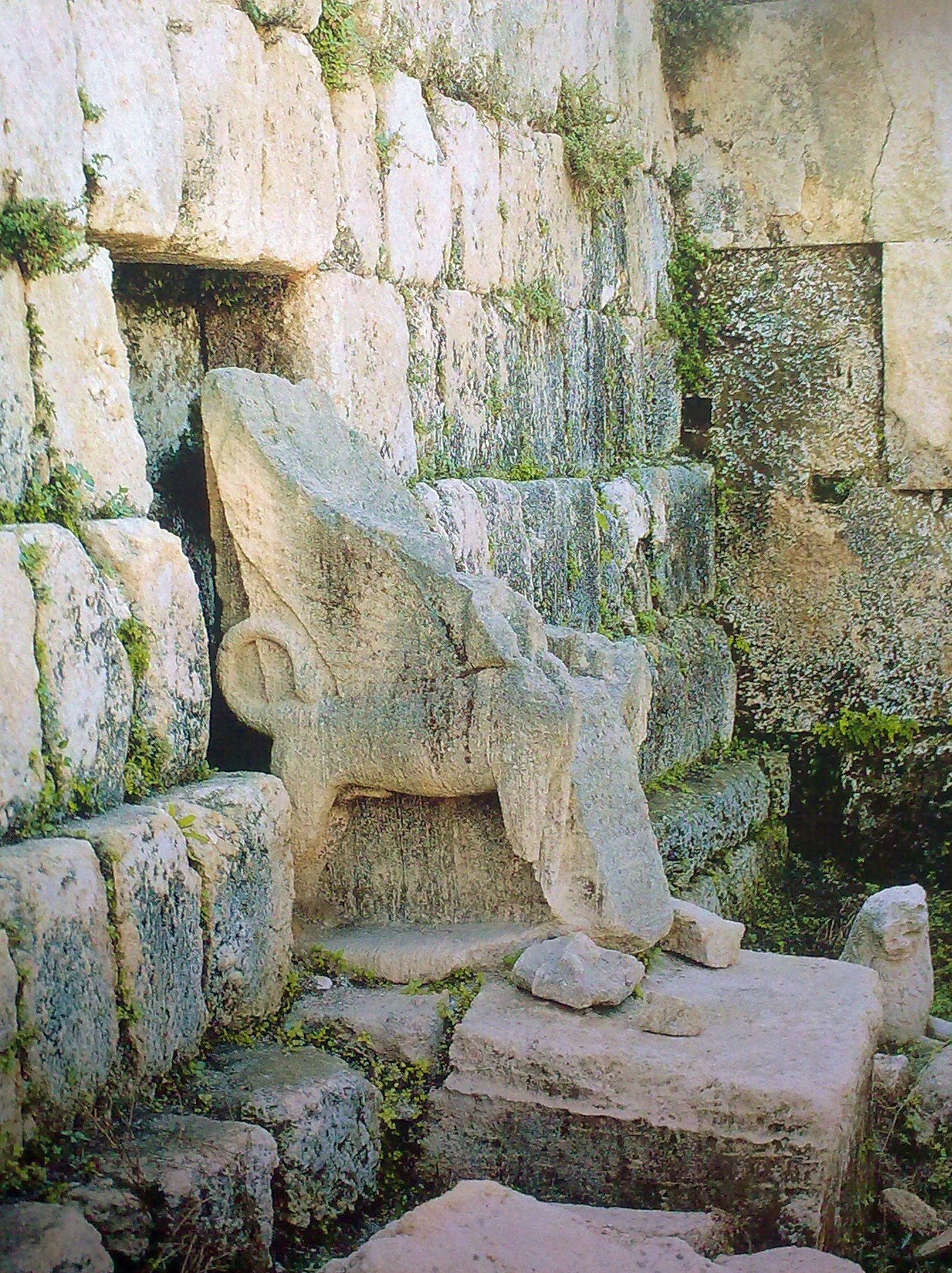
- Throne of Astarte at the Eshmun Temple

- Location within Lebanon Location within Near East
- 33°35′08″N 35°23′53″E
- Cultures: Phoenician, Achaemenid, Hellenistic and Roman
- Location: Bustan el-Sheikh, near Sidon, Lebanon

History
- Built: 7th century BC
- Built by: Eshmunazar II, Bodashtart
- Abandoned: 4th century AD

Site notes
- Architectural styles: Phoenician, Achaemenid, Hellenistic and Roman
- Excavation dates: 1901–1903; 1903–1904; 1920; 1963–1975
- Archaeologists: Theodore Makridi; Wilhelm Von Landau; Gaston Contenau; Maurice Dunand
- Discovered: 1900
- Condition: Ruined
- Owner: Government of Lebanon
- Management: Directorate General of Antiquities
- Public access: Yes (for a fee)

The Temple of Eshmun (Arabic: معبد أشمون) is an ancient place of worship dedicated to Eshmun, the Phoenician god of healing. It is located near the Awali river, 2 kilometres (1.2 mi) northeast of Sidon in southwestern Lebanon. The site was occupied from the 7th century BC to the 8th century AD, suggesting an integrated relationship with the nearby city of Sidon. Although originally constructed by Sidonian king Eshmunazar II in the Achaemenid era (c. 529–333 BC) to celebrate the city's recovered wealth and stature, the temple complex was greatly expanded by Bodashtart, Yatonmilk and later monarchs. Because the continued expansion spanned many centuries of alternating independence and foreign hegemony, the sanctuary features a wealth of different architectural and decorative styles and influences.

The sanctuary consists of an esplanade and a grand court limited by a huge limestone terrace wall that supports a monumental podium which was once topped by Eshmun's Greco-Persian style marble temple. The sanctuary features a series of ritual ablution basins fed by canals channeling water from the Asclepius river (modern Awali) and from the sacred "YDLL" spring; (Note: The Phoenicians did not mark vowels at all until the Punics fitfully added a system of matres lectionis (vowel letters); for this reason the Phoenician inscription "YDLL" may be transcribed with a number of variant spellings (Yidlal, Yadlol etc.) Franz L. Benz (1982). Personal Names in the Phoenician and Punic Inscriptions. Pontificio Istituto Biblico. p. 199, ISBN 9788876534270.) these installations were used for therapeutic and purificatory purposes that characterize the cult of Eshmun. The sanctuary site has yielded many artifacts of value, especially those inscribed with Phoenician texts, such as the Bodashtart inscriptions and the Eshmun inscription, providing valuable insight into the site's history and that of ancient Sidon.

The Eshmun Temple was improved during the early Roman Empire with a colonnade street, but declined after earthquakes and fell into oblivion as Christianity replaced polytheism and its large limestone blocks were used to build later structures. The temple site was rediscovered in 1900 by local treasure hunters who stirred the curiosity of international scholars. Maurice Dunand, a French archaeologist, thoroughly excavated the site from 1963 until the beginning of the Lebanese Civil War in 1975. After the end of the hostilities and the withdrawal by Israel from Southern Lebanon, the site was rehabilitated and inscribed to the World Heritage Site tentative list.

== Eshmun ==
Eshmun (Latinized form of the Phoenician 𐤀𐤔𐤌𐤍) was the Phoenician god of healing and renewal of life; he was one of the most important divinities of the Phoenician pantheon and the main male divinity of Sidon. Originally a nature divinity, and a god of spring vegetation, Eshmun was equated to Babylonian deity Tammuz. His role later expanded within the Phoenician pantheon, and he gained celestial and cosmic attributes. The myth of Eshmun was related by the sixth century Syrian Neoplatonist philosopher Damascius and ninth century Patriarch of Constantinople, Photius. They recount that Eshmun, a young man from Beirut, was hunting in the woods when Astarte saw him and was stricken by his beauty. She harassed him with her amorous pursuit until he emasculated himself with an axe and died. The grieving goddess revived Eshmun and transported him to the heavens where she made him into a god of heaven. (Note: in Damascius's Life of Isidore and Photius's Bibliotheca Codex 242)

From a historical perspective, the first written mention of Eshmun goes back to 754 BC, the date of the signing of the treaty between Assyrian king Ashur-nirari V and Mati'el, king of Arpad; Eshmun figures in the text as a patron of the treaty. Eshmun was identified with Asclepius as a result of the Hellenic influence over Phoenicia; the earliest evidence of this equation is given by coins from Amrit and Acre from the third century BC. This fact is exemplified by the Hellenized names of the Awali river which was dubbed Asclepius fluvius, and the Eshmun Temple's surrounding groves, known as the groves of Asclepius.

== History ==
=== Historical background ===
In the 9th century BC, the Assyrian king Ashurnasirpal II conquered the Lebanon mountain range and its coastal cities. The new sovereigns exacted tribute from Sidon, along with every other Phoenician city. These payments stimulated Sidon's search for new means of provisioning and furthered Phoenician emigration and expansion, which peaked in the 8th century BC. When Assyrian king Sargon II died in 705 BC, King Luli joined with the Egyptians and Judah in an unsuccessful rebellion against Assyrian rule, but was forced to flee to Kition (modern Larnaca in Cyprus) with the arrival of the Assyrian army headed by Sennacherib, Sargon II's son and successor. Sennacherib instated Ittobaal on the throne of Sidon and reimposed the annual tribute. When Abdi-Milkutti ascended to Sidon's throne in 680 BC, he also rebelled against the Assyrians. In response, the Assyrian king Esarhaddon laid siege to the city. Abdi-Milkutti was captured and beheaded in 677 BC after a three-year siege, while his city was destroyed and renamed Kar-Ashur-aha-iddina (the harbor of Esarhaddon). Sidon was stripped of its territory, which was awarded to Baal I, the king of rival Tyre, and loyal vassal to Esarhaddon. Baal I and Esarhaddon signed a treaty in 675 in which Eshmun's name features as one of the deities invoked as guarantors of the covenant. (Note: Eshmun's name is transcribed in Akkadian as "Ia-su-mu-nu" in the Esarhaddon treaty)

=== Construction ===
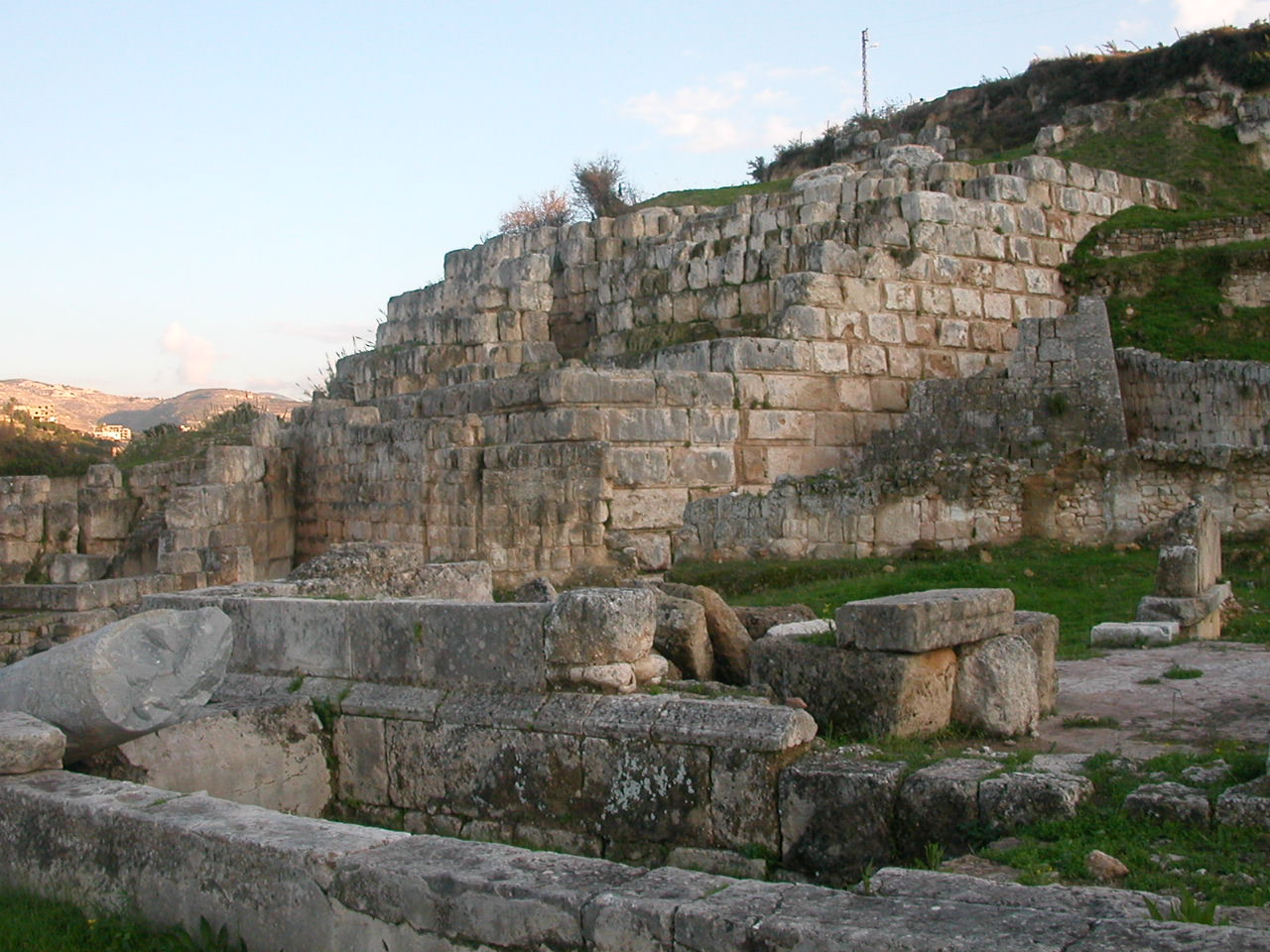
The ashlar podium at the Eshmun temple, Bustan esh-Sheikh (near Sidon)

Sidon returned to its former level of prosperity while Tyre was besieged for 13 years (586–573 BC) by Nebuchadnezzar II. Nevertheless, the Sidonian king was still held in exile at the court of Babylon. Sidon reclaimed its former standing as Phoenicia's chief city in the Achaemenid Empire (c.529–333 BC). Eshmunazar I, a priest of Astarte, and the founder of his namesake dynasty, became king around the time of the Achaemenid conquest of the Levant. Archaeological evidence suggest that, at the time of the advent of the Eshmunazar dynasty, there already was a cultic space on the site of the temple, but there were no monumental constructions yet. Originally, the center of worship may have been a cave or a spring. In the following years, Xerxes I awarded king Eshmunazar II with the Sharon plain (Note: Territory south of Sidon from Mount Carmel to Jaffa) for employing Sidon's fleet in his service during the Greco-Persian Wars. Eshmunazar II displayed his new-found wealth by constructing numerous temples to Sidonian divinities. Inscriptions found on the king's sarcophagus reveal that he and his mother, Amoashtart, built temples to the gods of Sidon, including the Temple of Eshmun by the "Ydll source near the cistern".

Plan of the temple of Eshmun

As the Bodashtart inscriptions on the foundations of the monumental podium attest, construction of the sanctuary's podium did not begin until the reign of King Bodashtart. The first set of inscriptions bears the name of Bodashtart alone, while the second contains his name and that of the crown prince Yatonmilk. Thirty foundation inscriptions are known to date; they were found concealed in the interior of the podium. The practice of intentional inscription concealment can be traced back to Mesopotamian roots, and it has parallels in the royal buildings of the Achaemenids in Persia and Elam. A Phoenician inscription, located 3 kilometres (1.9 mi) upstream from the temple, that dates to the 7th year of Bodashtart's reign, alludes to water adduction works from the Awali river to the "Ydll" source that was used for ritual purification at the temple.

=== Roman era and decline ===
The Eshmun sanctuary was damaged by an earthquake in the fourth century BC, which demolished the marble temple atop the podium; this structure was not rebuilt but many chapels and temples were later annexed at the base of the podium. The temple site remained a place of pilgrimage in the classical antiquity during the early Roman Empire and until the advent of Christianity, when the cult of Eshmun was banned during the Persecution of pagans in the late Roman Empire and a Christian church was built at the temple site across the Roman street from the podium. A Roman colonnade was built in the third century, probably by emperor Septimius Severus, and a Roman Villa showed a period of renewed relative importance for the city during the late period of Phoenicia under Roman rule. Furthermore, within the original Phoenician temple site the Romans added the processional stairway, the basins for ablutions and a nymphaeum with pictorial mosaics, that are still largely intact. Worn statuettes of three nymphs stand in the niches of a Roman fountain. Another earthquake hit Sidon around 570 AD; Antoninus of Piacenza, an Italian Christian pilgrim, described the city as partly in ruins. For many years after the disappearance of the cult of Eshmun, the sanctuary site was used as a quarry: Emir Fakhr-al-Din II used its massive blocks to build a bridge over the Awali river in the 17th century. The site later fell into oblivion until the 19th century

=== Modern discovery ===
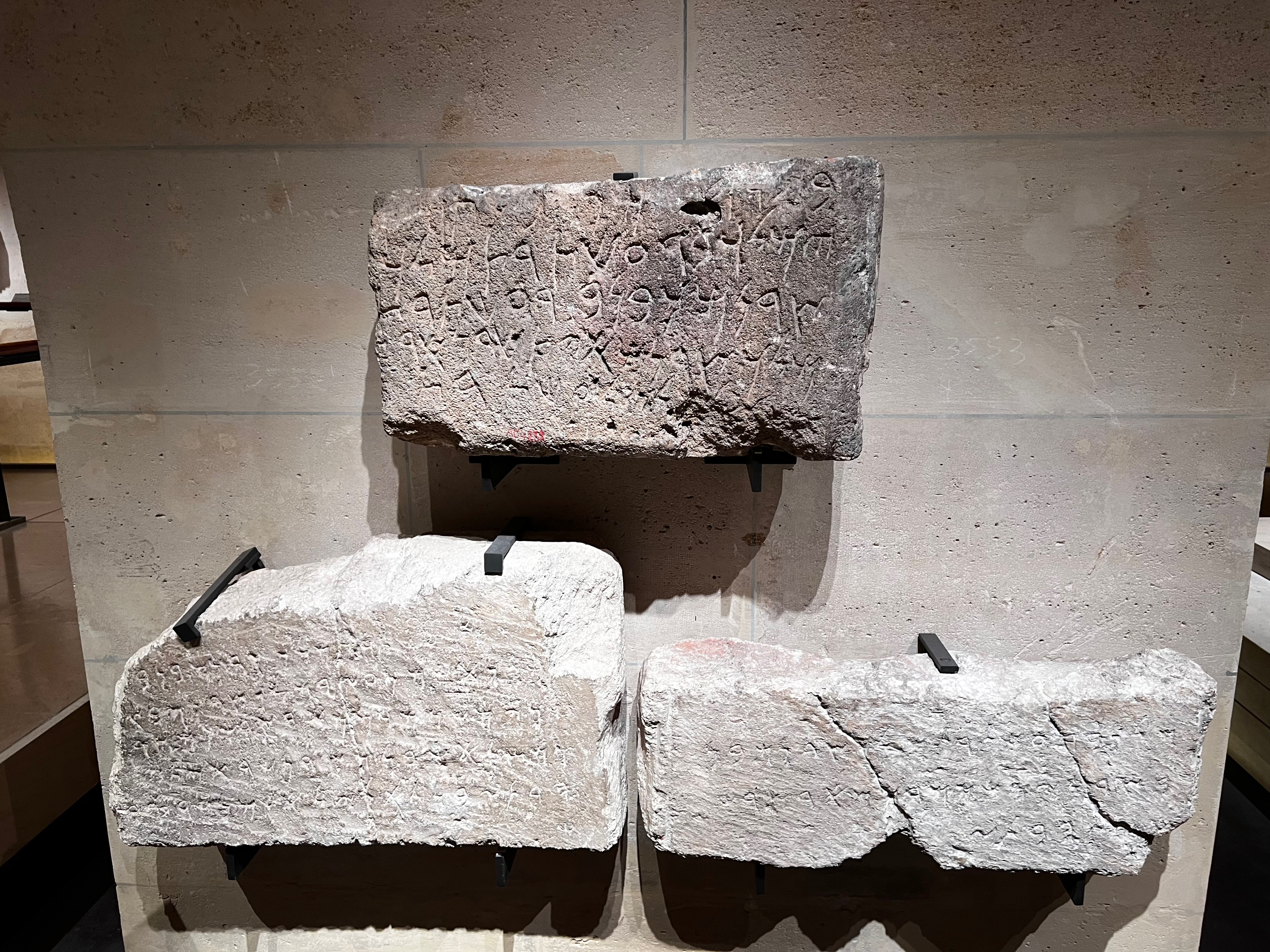
Three of the Bodashtart inscriptions from the temple's podium, now on display in the Louvre

Between 1737 and 1742, Richard Pococke, an English anthropologist, toured the Middle East and wrote of what he thought were ruins of defensive walls built with 3.7-metre (12 ft) stone blocks near the Awali river. When the French orientalist Ernest Renan visited the area in 1860, he noticed that the Awali bridge abutments were built of finely rusticated blocks that originated from an earlier structure. He also noted in his report, Mission de Phénicie, that a local treasure hunter told him of a large edifice near the Awali bridge. The discovery was made in 1900 by four workers who were extracting blocks from the temple on behalf of Druze notable Nassib Jumblatt. They noticed that certain blocks had inscriptions with the engravings painted in red. A local antiques dealer bought three of the stones, all with the same inscription. Due to the enormous size of the blocks, they were cut down to just 15 or 20 cm in thickness, and some stones were also cut into two or three pieces. The Ottoman authorities dispatched Theodore Makridi, curator of the Museum of Constantinople, who cleared the temple remains between 1901 and 1903. Wilhelm Von Landau also excavated the site between 1903 and 1904. In 1920, Gaston Contenau headed a team of archaeologists who again surveyed the temple complex. The first extensive archaeological excavation revealing the Eshmun Temple remains was undertaken by Maurice Dunand between 1963 and 1975. Archaeological evidence shows that the site was occupied from the seventh century BC to the eighth century AD.

=== After 1975 ===
During the Lebanese Civil War and the Israeli occupation of South Lebanon (1985–2000), the temple site was neglected and was invaded by vegetation overgrowth; it was cleared and recovered its former condition after the Israeli withdrawal. Today the Eshmun sanctuary can be visited all year round and free of charge, it is accessible from an exit ramp off the main Southern Lebanon highway near Sidon's northern entrance. The site holds a particular archaeological importance since it is the best preserved Phoenician site in Lebanon; it was added to the UNESCO World Heritage Tentative List's Cultural category on July 1, 1996. In literature, the temple of Eshmun figures in Nabil Saleh's 2009 novel, The Curse of Ezekiel as the setting where Bomilcar falls in love and rescues princess Chiboulet from the evil design of one of the temple's priests. The site was added to the UNESCO World Heritage Tentative List on July 11, 2019, in the Cultural category. During the 2024 Israeli invasion of Lebanon, UNESCO gave enhanced protection to 34 cultural sites in Lebanon including the sanctuary of Eshmun to safeguard it from damage.

== Location ==
A number of ancient texts mention the Eshmun Temple and its location. The Phoenician inscriptions on the sarcophagus of Eshmunazar II, a Sidonian king, (Note: Discovered by the general consulate of France in Beirut Aimé Pérétié in 1855 in the Magharet Adloun necropolis, now on display in the Louvre) commemorate the construction of a "house" for the "holy prince" Eshmun by the king and his mother, queen Amashtart, at the "Ydll source by the cistern". Dionysius Periegetes, an ancient Greek travel writer, identified the Eshmun temple by the Bostrenos River, and Antonin de Plaisance, a 6th-century AD Italian pilgrim recorded the shrine as near the river Asclepius fluvius. Strabo (Note: In Strabo's "Geographica") and other Sidonian sources describe the sanctuary and its surrounding "sacred forests" of Asclepius, the Hellenized name of Eshmun, in written texts. Located about 40 kilometres (25 mi) south of Beirut and 2 kilometres (1.2 mi) northeast of Sidon, the Eshmun Temple sits on the southern bank of the modern Awali river, previously referred to as Bostrenos or Asclepius fluvius in ancient texts. Citrus groves, known as Bustan el-Sheikh (Arabic: بستان الشيخ, the grove of the Sheikh), occupy the ancient "sacred forests" of Asclepius and are a favorite summer picnic location for locals.

== Architecture and description ==
Remains from the early, oriental style temple

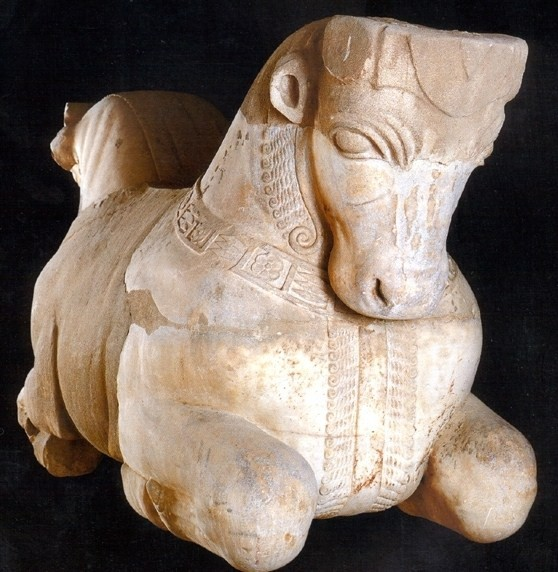
Bull head protome in the National Museum of Beirut

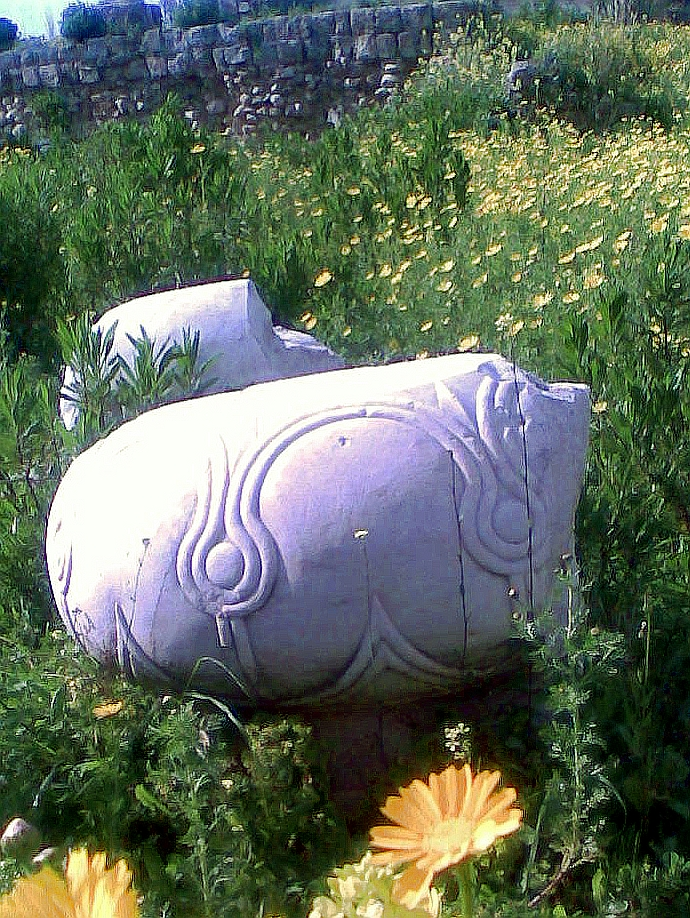
Base of a Babylonian-style column in Bustan el-Sheikh

Built under Babylonian rule (605–539 BC), the oldest monument at the site was a pyramidal building resembling a ziggurat that included an access ramp to a water cistern. Fragments of an early, Babylonian-style temple survived into modern time; these include marble torus-shaped column bases with moldings, facetted columns, and bull protome capitals. The Babylonian-style temple was dismantled around the middle of the 4th century BC. The remains of the demolished temple were cast in a favissa that only contained material dating from the 5th and first half of the 4th century BC.

The pyramidal structure was superimposed during the Persian period by a massive ashlar podium constructed from heavily bossed limestone blocks that measured more than 3 metres (9.8 ft) across by 1 metre (3.3 ft) thick, which were laid down in courses 1-metre (3.3 ft) high. The podium stands 22 metres (72 ft) high, runs 50 metres (160 ft) into the hillside, and boasts a 70-metre (230 ft) wide façade. The terrace atop of the podium was once covered by a Greco-Persian style marble temple built in the Ionic order around 500 BC. The marble temple has been reduced to a few remaining stone fragments due to theft. During the Hellenistic period, the sanctuary was extended from the base of the podium across the valley. To the east base of the podium stands a large chapel, 10.5 by 11.5 metres (34 ft × 38 ft), dating to the 4th century BC. The chapel was adorned with a paved pool and a large stone "Throne of Astarte" carved of a single block of granite in the Egyptian style; it is flanked by two sphinx figures and surrounded by two lion sculptures. The throne, attributed to the Sidonian goddess Astarte, rests against the chapel wall, which is embellished by relief sculptures of hunting scenes. The once important Astarte basin lost its function during the 2nd century AD and was filled with earth and statue fragments. The west base contains another 4th-century BC chapel – centered on a bull protome topped capital – that remains preserved at the National Museum of Beirut.

Widely known as the "Tribune of Eshmun" because of its shape, the altar of Eshmun is a white marble structure dating to the 4th century BC. It is 2.15 metres (7.1 ft) long by 2.26 metres (7.4 ft) wide and 2.17 metres (7.1 ft) tall. Unearthed in 1963 by Maurice Dunand, it stands on a limestone socleplated with marble blocks that rest against a retaining wall. The altar is adorned with Hellenistic style relief sculptures and is framed by decorative moldings, one of which divides the altar into two distinct registers of symmetrical composition. The upper register portrays 18 Greek deities, (Note: The front register depicts from left to right: Eros, an unidentified matronly goddess who stands behind Artemis who is crowning an enthroned Leto. Apollo stands, playing a cithara next to Athena. Zeus appears next, enthroned with Hera standing by his side followed by standing figures of Amphitrite and Poseidon who stands at the right corner, his foot resting on a rock. On the right short side, turning the corner from Eros, the standing figures and the charioteer are identified as Demeter, Persephone and Helios. On the opposite short side, the three personages are assumed to be Dione, Aphrodite and Selene driving a quadriga. (from Brunilde Sismondo Ridgway's Fourth-century styles in Greek sculpture)) including two charioteers surrounding the Greek god Apollo, who is depicted playing a cithara (a type of lyre). The lower register honors Dionysus, who leads his thiasos (his ecstatic retinue) in a dance to the music of pipe and cithara players. The Tribune is displayed at the National Museum of Beirut.

The second, classical temple of Eshmun

Ionian capital reconstruction from the classical temple of Eshmun

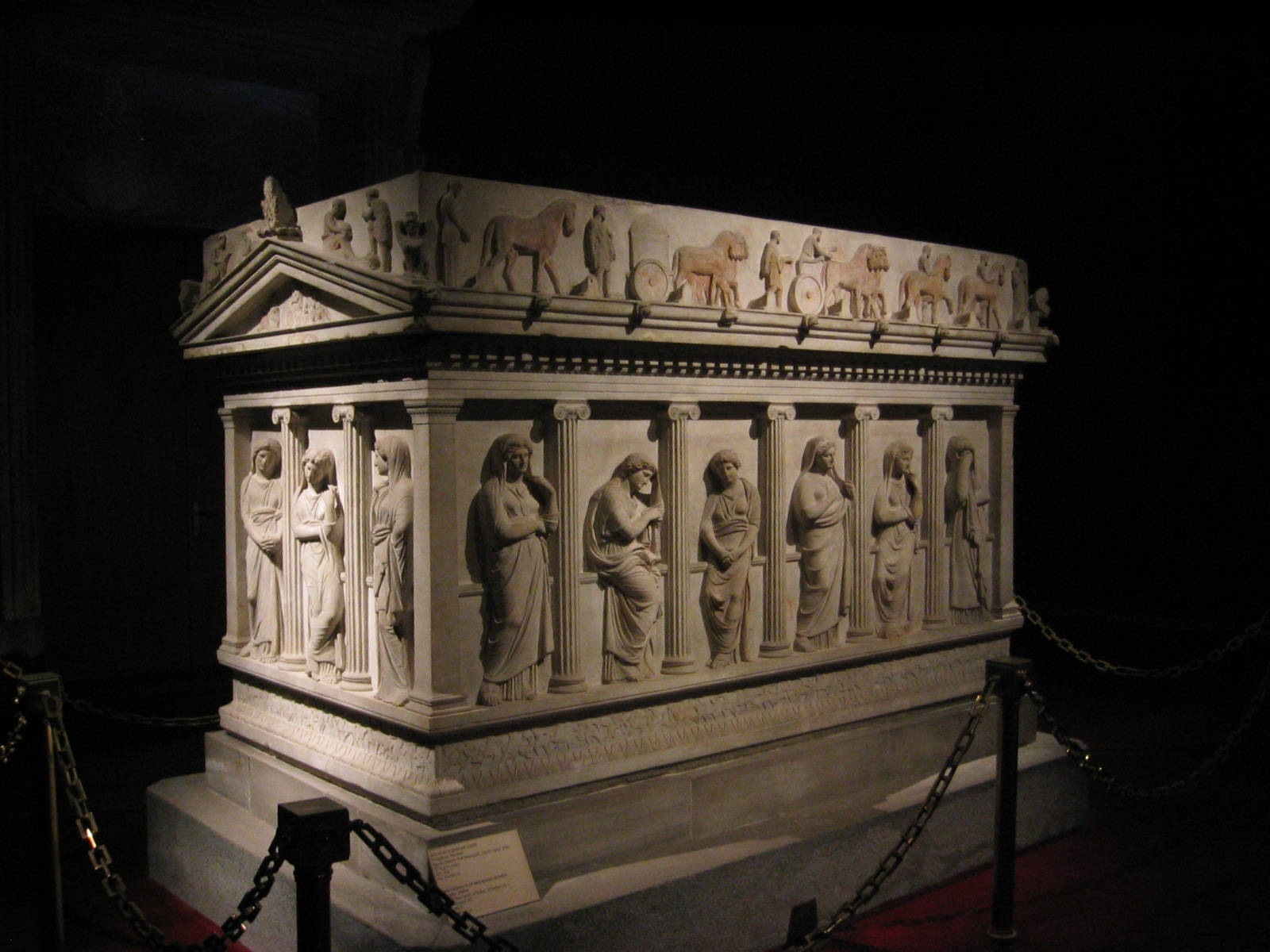
Based on retrieved marble fragments, Swiss classical archaeologist Rolf Stucky proposed that the second temple must have closely resembled the one depicted on the Weeping Women sarcophagus, which was unearthed in the royal necropolis of Aaya in Sidon.

Northeast of the site, another 3rd century BC temple stands adjacent to the Astarte chapel. Its 22-metre (72 ft) façade is built with large limestone blocks and displays a two-register relief decoration illustrating a drunken revelry in honor of Dionysus, the Greek god of wine. Among the temple reliefs, one shows a man attempting to seize a large rooster which was the common sacrificial animal for Eshmun-Asclepius. The Eshmun Temple complex comprises an elaborate hydraulic installation channeling water from "Ydll" spring that is made up of an intricate system of water canals, a series of retaining basins, sacred ablution basins and paved pools. This system demonstrates the importance of ritual ablutions in Phoenician therapeutic cults. Later vestiges date from the Roman epoch and include a colonnaded road lined with shops. Of the large marble columns bordering the Roman street only fragments and bases remain. The Romans also built a monumental staircase adorned with mosaic patterns that leads to the top of the podium. To the right of the Roman road, near the entrance of the site stands a nymphaeum with niches where statues of the nymphs once stood. The floor of the nymphaeum is covered by a mosaic depicting the Maenads. Across the colonnaded road, facing the nymphaeum, are the ruins of a Roman villa; only the villa's courtyard has survived along with the remains of a mosaic depicting the four seasons. To the right of the processional Roman staircase stands a cubic altar, also of Roman construction. Other Roman period structures include two columns of a great portico leading to pools and other cultic installations.

== Function ==
Eshmun's cult enjoyed a particular importance at Sidon as he was the chief deity after 500 BC. Aside from the extramural sanctuary at Bustan el-Sheikh, Eshmun also had a temple within the city. The extramural Eshmun Temple was associated with purification and healing; ritual lustral ablutions were performed in the sanctuary's sacred basins supplemented by running water from the Asclepius River and the "Ydll" spring water which was considered to have a sacred character and therapeutic quality. The healing attributions of Eshmun were combined with his divine consort Astarte's fertilizing powers; the latter had an annex chapel with a sacred paved pool within the Eshmun sanctuary. Pilgrims from all over the ancient world flocked to the Eshmun Temple leaving votive traces of their devotion and proof of their cure. There is evidence that from the 3rd century BC onwards there have been attempts to Hellenize the cult of Eshmun and to associate him with his Greek counterpart Asclepius, but the sanctuary retained its curative function.

== Artifacts and finds ==
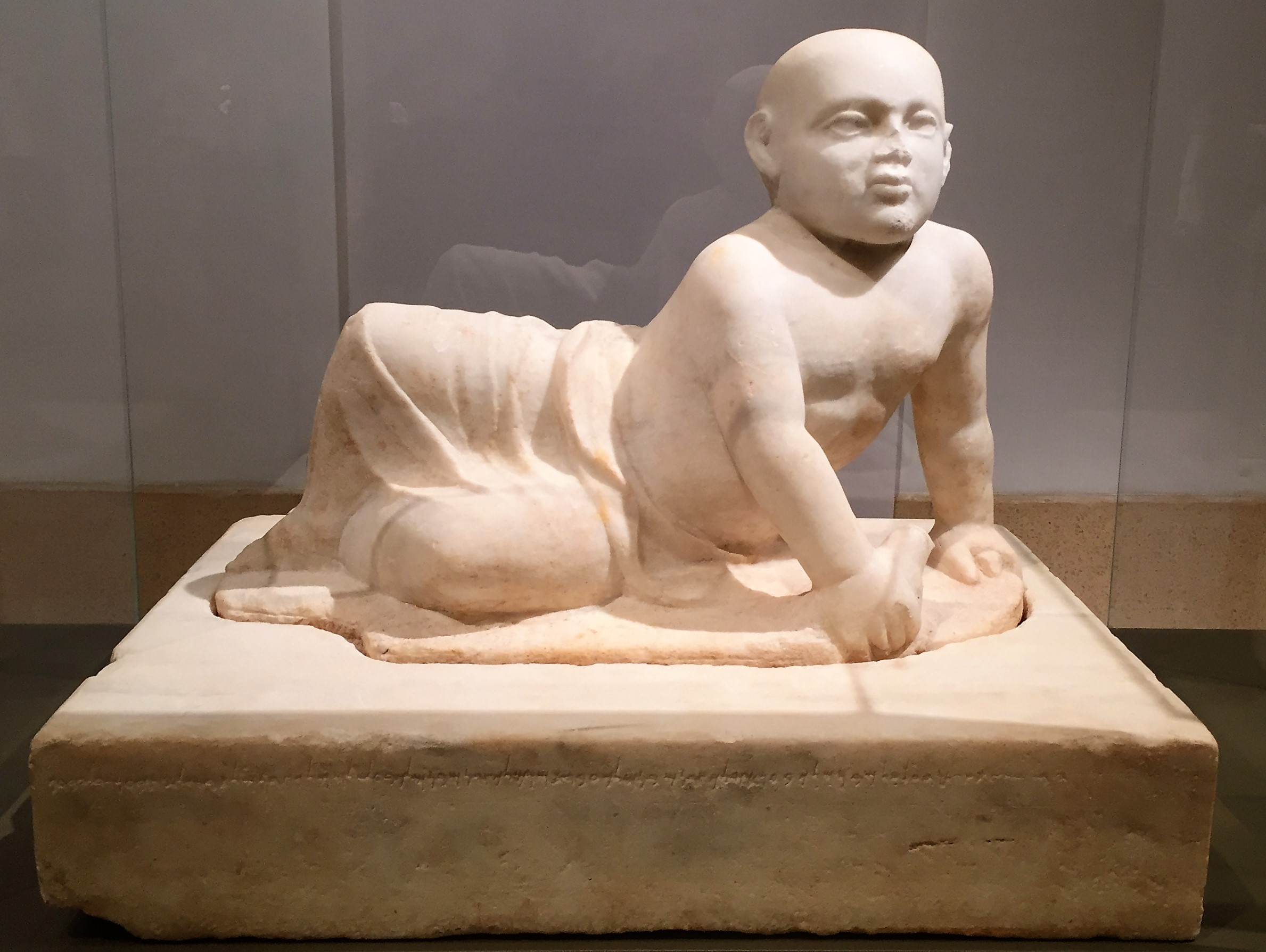
Baalshillem Temple Boy: a votive marble statue of a royal child, inscribed in Phoenician, from the temple of Eshmun c. 400 BC

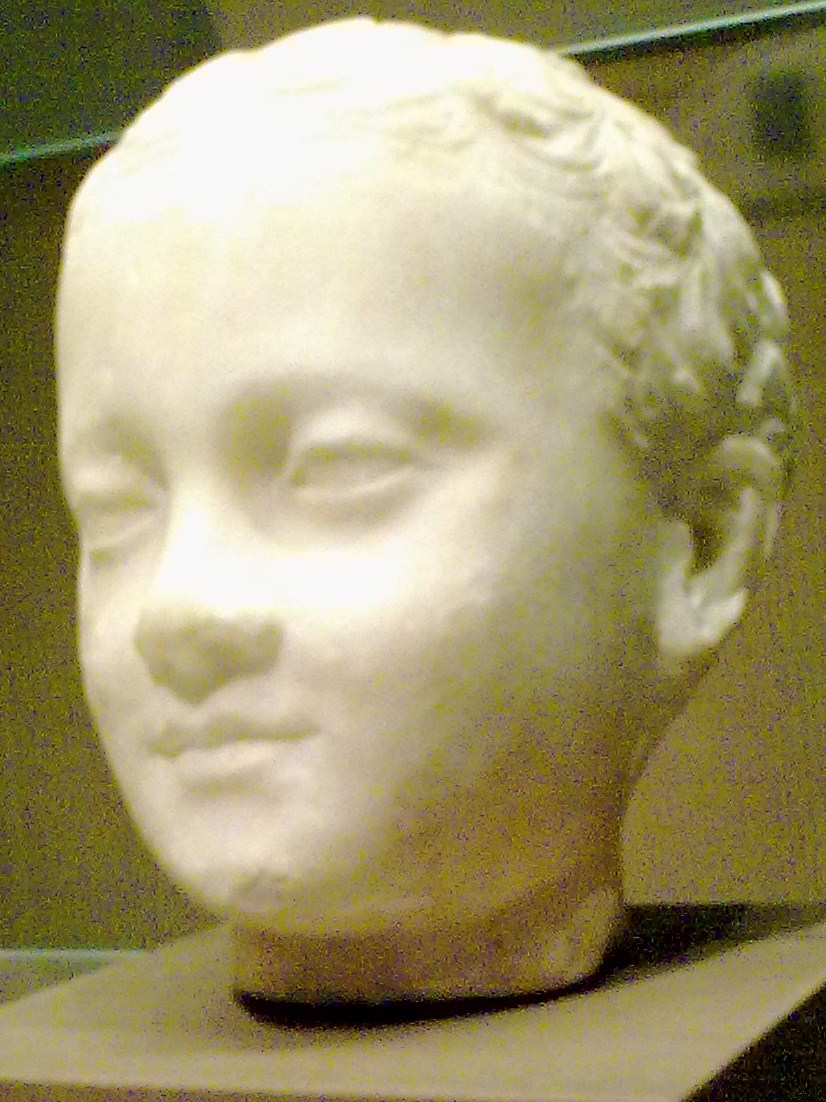
Votive marble head of a child, beginning of the 4th century BC, at the National Museum of Beirut

Apart from the large decorative elements, carved friezes and mosaics which were left in situ, many artifacts were recovered and moved from the Eshmun Temple to the National Museum of Beirut, the Louvre or are in possession of the Lebanese directorate general of antiquities. Some of these smaller finds include a collection of inscribed ostraca unearthed by Dunand providing rare examples of cursive Phoenician writing in the Phoenician mainland. One of the recovered ostracon bears the theophoric Phoenician name "grtnt" which suggests that veneration of the lunar-goddess Tanit occurred in Sidon. (Note: Antoine Vanel, Six "ostraca" phéniciens trouvés dans le temple d'Echmoun, près de Saida, in Bulletin du Musée de Beyrouth, 20, (1967), p. 53) A number of fragmented votive life-size sculptures of little children lying on their side and holding a pet animal or a small object were also recovered at the temple site; among the best known of these is the Baalshillem Temple Boy, a sculpture of a royal child holding a dove with his right hand. The boy's head is shaved, his torso is bare and his lower body is wrapped in a large cloth. The socle of this sculpture is inscribed with a dedication from Baalshillem II, (Note: The dedication reads: "This (is the) statue which Baalshillem son of King Ba'na, king of the Sidonians, son of King Abdamun, king of the Sidonians, son of King Baalshillem, king of the Sidonians, gave to his lord Eshmun at the "Ydll"-Spring. May he bless him" (taken from JCL Gibson's Textbook of Syrian Semitic inscriptions)) a Sidonian king to Eshmun, which illustrates the importance of the site to the Sidonian monarchy. These votive sculptures appear to have been purposely broken after dedication to Eshmun and then ceremoniously cast into the sacred canal, probably simulating the sacrifice of the sick child. All of these sculptures represent boys. A31.5 cm × 27 cm (12.4 in × 10.6 in) limestone bust of a Kouros dating from the 6th century BC was found at the site, but unlike the archaic Greek kouroi this figure is not bare. Among the notable finds is a golden plaque showing a snake curling on a staff, a Hellenic symbol of Eshmun. and a granite altar bearing the name of Egyptian Pharaoh Achoris uncovered in the Eshmun sanctuary. This gift attests to the good relations between the Pharaoh and the kings of Sidon. The repute of the sanctuary was far reaching. Cypriot pilgrims from Paphos left marks of their devotion for Astarte on a marble stele inscribed both in Greek and Cypriot syllabary at Astarte's shrine; this stele is now in the custody of the Lebanese directorate general of antiquities.

== Pillaging ==
Treasure hunters have sought out the Eshmun Temple since antiquity; around 1900 artifacts bearing Phoenician inscriptions from the temple site found their way to Beirut's antiquities markets where they stirred the interest of the Ottoman authorities and prompted a series of archeological digs. During the civil war, upon a request from then Lebanese director general of antiquities Maurice Chehab, Maurice Dunand moved more than 2000 artifacts from Sidon to a subterranean chamber at the Byblos crusader castle, 30 kilometres (19 mi) north of Beirut. In 1981, the depot was looted and around 600 sculptures and architectural elements were stolen and smuggled out of Lebanon. Rolf Stucky, ex-director of the Institute of Classical Archaeology of Basel affirmed during a conference in Beirut in December 2009 the successful identification and return of eight sculptures to the Lebanese national museum.

== See also ==
- Phoenician sanctuary of Kharayeb – Historic temple remains in Lebanon
- Roman temple of Bziza – Cultural heritage building in Bziza, Lebanon
- Sanctuary of Yanouh – Ancient sanctuary in Lebanon
