= Eshmun inscription =

Phoenician inscription

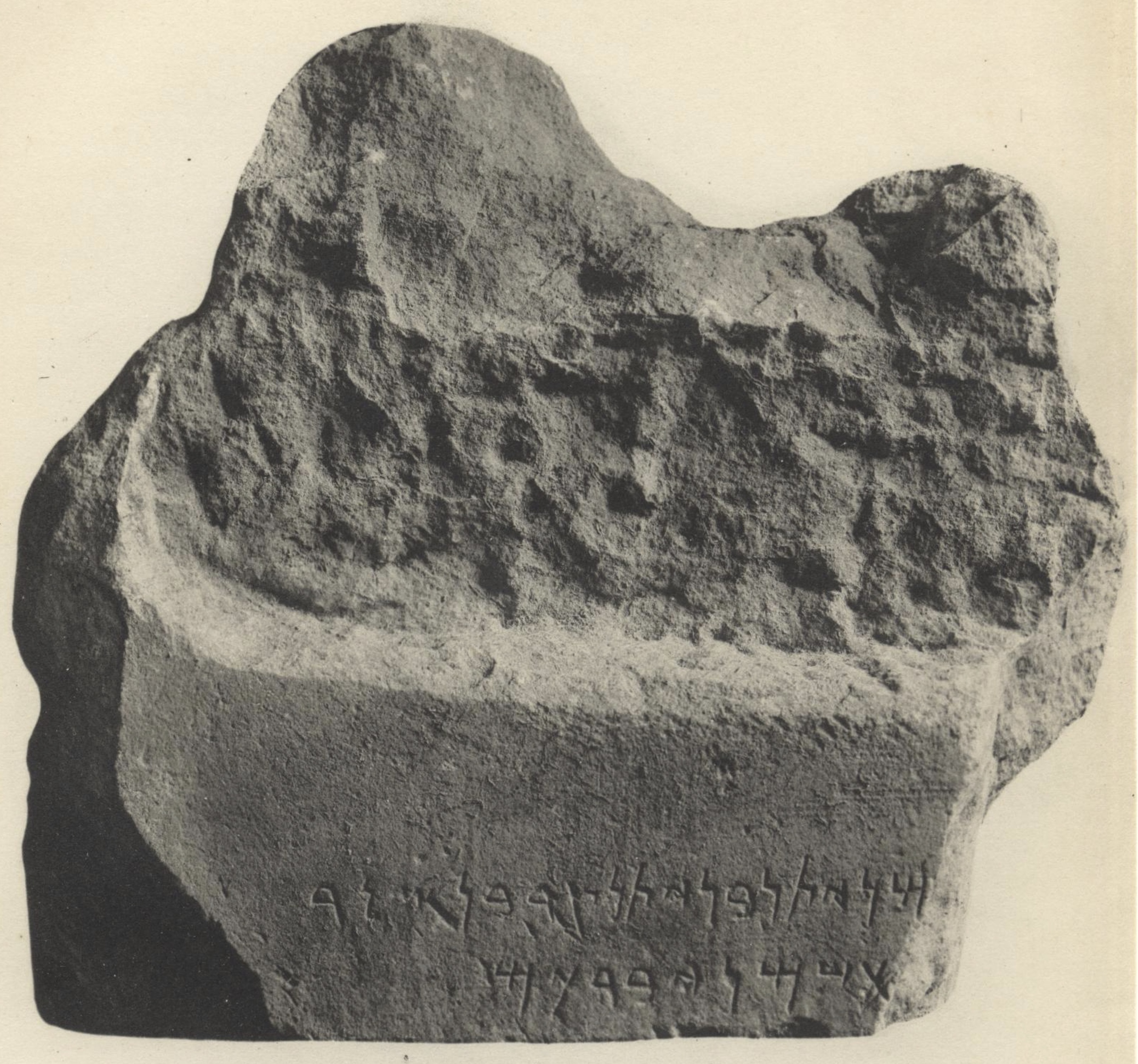
Photo of the inscription, 1901

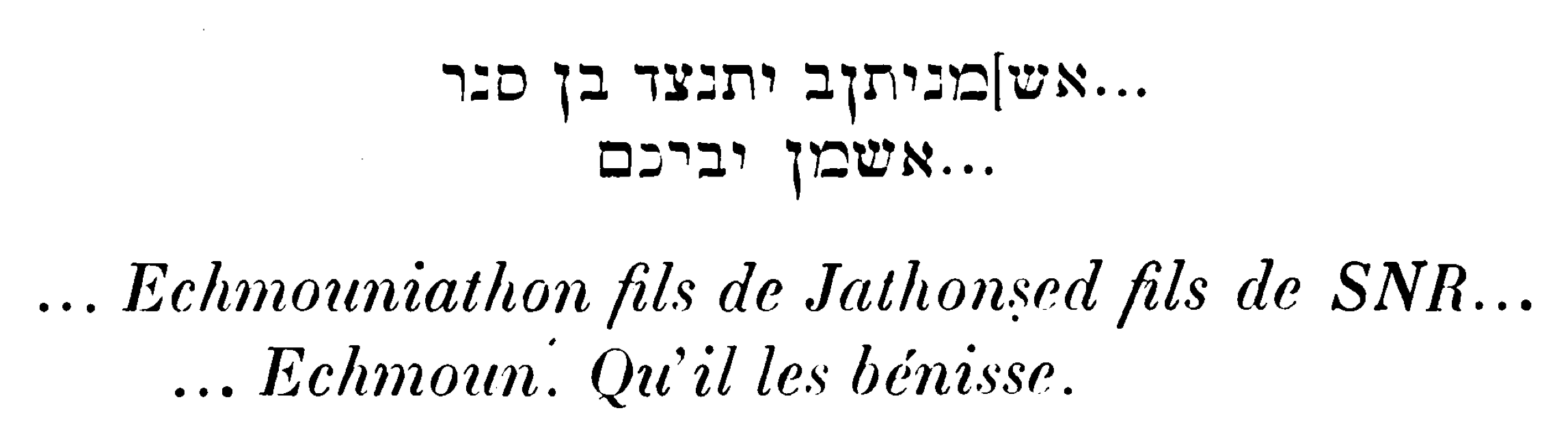
Modern Hebrew transcription and French translation of the inscription

The Eshmun inscription is a Phoenician inscription on a fragment of grey-blue limestone found at the Temple of Eshmun in 1901. It is also known as RES 297. Some elements of the writing have been said to be similar to the Athenian Greek-Phoenician inscriptions. Today, it is held in the Museum of the Ancient Orient in Istanbul.

The inscription reads:

(line 1)	... W’Š]MNYTN BN YTNṢD BN SNR	[... and Esh]munyaton, the son of Yatontsid, (grand)son of SNR,
(2)	... (L’LNM) L]’ŠMN YBRKM	[and ... (more names) dedicated this object to (the god), to] Eshmun. May he bless them!

== Bibliography ==
- Lidzbarski, Mark, Ephemeris für semitische Epigraphik, volume II, 54-55
- Lagrange, M. J. “NOTES D’ÉPIGRAPHIE SÉMITIQUE.” Revue Biblique (1892–1940), vol. 11, no. 1, Peeters Publishers, 1902, pp. 94–99, https://www.jstor.org/stable/44100617.
- Clermont-Ganneau, Dédicace phénicienne à Echmoun provenant de Sidon, Receuil d’Archéologie Orientale 5, 1903, 34-35
- Lagrange, M. J. “NOTE SUR LES INSCRIPTIONS TROUVÉES PAR MACRIDY-BEY A BOSTAN-ECH-CHEIKH.” Revue Biblique (1892–1940), vol. 11, no. 4, Peeters Publishers, 1902, pp. 515–26, http://www.jstor.org/stable/44100674.
