= Frederick Haberman =

Frederick Haberman (born Friedrich Habermann 18 July 1881 in Sagan, Germany – October 3, 1944) was a German-Canadian-American historian, theologian, lecturer and publisher. He was an early proponent of Christian Identity and published one of the first books on the subject entitled Tracing Our Ancestors (1934, Kingdom Press, St. Petersburg, Florida). He emigrated from Germany to Saint John, New Brunswick, Canada, in 1902 and settled in Newcastle, New Brunswick (now Miramichi), and emigrated from Canada to the United States in 1918, eventually becoming a naturalized citizen of the United States.

== Works ==
The message of the Great Pyramid to the Anglo-Saxons,: Isaac's sons (1928)
The great pyramid's message to America (1932)
The Seven Times of Prophecy and the Seventy Weeks of Daniel including the Numbers and Cycles of Chronology and Scripture (1933)
Tracing Our Ancestors: Were They Descendants of Apes or of Adam (1934)
Armageddon has come: The climax of the ages is near (1941)
America's appointed destiny: As outlined by the Scriptures and the great seal of our nation (1942)
Tracing our white ancestors (1962, 1979 reprint of "Tracing Our Ancestors")
