= Phoenicia under Babylonian rule =

The land of Phoenicia (roughly corresponding to modern Lebanon) was ruled by the Neo-Babylonian Empire from around 605 BC to 538 BC.

== Babylonian conquest ==
Prior to the rise of the Babylonian Empire in the late 7th century BC, Phoenicia had been a well-sought after land in the eastern Mediterranean with Hittites and then Assyrians occupying the country in the 13th - 12th centuries and 10th - 7th centuries respectively. Following the collapse of the Assyrian Empire in Mesopotamia in 609 BC, Assyrian forces continued to resist their Babylonian conquerors in Upper Mesopotamia until 605 BC, when Babylon finally defeated the Assyrians at Carchemish, ending the last vestige of the Assyrian Empire. The conquest of Assyria by Nebuchadnezzar II, king of Babylon, put him at odds with the Egyptian Pharaoh, whose interests lay in keeping a friendly Assyrian state in control of parts of the Levant. Consequently, the Babylonians had to fight the Egyptians in order to take control of Phoenicia and the rest of the eastern Mediterranean coast. However, the Egyptians were unable to contain the Babylonian might, and the Egyptians soon withdrew back to their homeland. The Babylonians moved into the former Assyrian provinces on the eastern Mediterranean coast, and Phoenicia became part of the new Babylonian Empire.

== The reign of Nebuchadnezzar (605 - 562 BC) ==
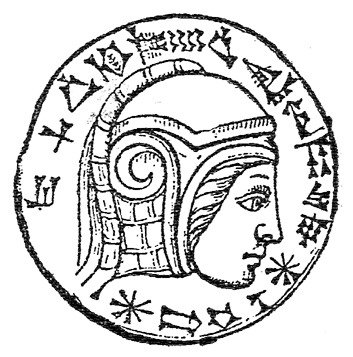
An engraving of Nebuchadnezzar

Nebuchadnezzar II, king of Babylon, ruled for around 43 years, from 605 BC to 562 BC. Nebuchadnezzar, like many other foreign rulers of Phoenicia before him, exploited Phoenicia's resources to enrich his empire. The economic benefits he gained included harvesting timber, which greatly financed his construction projects throughout Mesopotamia.

The Phoenician city-states frequently rebelled against their Babylonian overlords, which resulted in almost yearly campaigns to repress the revolts. In 586 BC, fresh from the destruction of Jerusalem, Nebuchadnezzar and his army laid siege to Tyre, which had revolted. After an incredible 13 years of siege, the city finally capitulated.

== Collapse of Babylon ==
Nebuchadnezzar's successors did him no credit and much of his gains were lost within a few decades. The rise of the Persians to the east was ignored by Babylon's incompetent rulers. Even before Babylon fell, Persia conquered Syria and seized Phoenicia from Babylonian rule. In the battle of Sardis, a smaller Persian army succeeded (with the aid of camels and spearmen) in defeating an alliance of Lydian princes and Asian Greeks. Since Nabonidus (King of Babylon from 556 BC) had sent troops to aid the Lydians and Greeks, the Persians then marched against Babylon and took the city in 539 BC, and the lands of the Babylonian Empire, including Phoenicia, passed into Persian hands.

== See also ==
- Phoenicia under Assyrian rule
- The Greatness That Was Babylon

== Sources ==
Georges Roux, Ancient Iraq
