= Phoenicia under Assyrian rule =

During the Middle Assyrian Empire (1392–1056 BC) and the Neo-Assyrian Empire (911–605 BC), Phoenicia, what is today known as Lebanon and coastal Syria, came under Assyrian rule on several occasions.

Southern Canaan (in modern terms Israel, the Palestinian Territories and Jordan) was inhabited by a number of Semitic states speaking Canaanite languages, these being Israel, Judah, Ammon, Edom, Moab, the Suteans and Amalekites. In addition, the Philistines migrated into this region from the Aegean, a non-Semitic Indo-European speaking people. Northern Canaan (in modern terms Lebanon, the Mediterranean coast of Syria and the Hatay Province of Turkey) was also inhabited by Canaanite speaking peoples, who coalesced into city-states such as Tyre, Sidon, Berytus, Arvad, Simyra, Onoba and Tarshish. The term Phoenicia was applied to this region, but it is a later Greek application which was not used during the Assyrian period.

To the east, in modern terms the interior of modern Syria (the Assyrian north east excluded), the region had since the 24th century BC been inhabited by the Canaanite speaking Amorites and for a time the East Semitic speaking Eblaites also, thus much of this region had been known as the Land of the Amurru. However, from the 12th century BC a new Semitic group appeared, in the form of the Arameans, and by the late 11th century BC this region was known as Aramea/Aram and Eber Nari and remained named as such during the latter part of the Middle Assyrian Empire, Neo Assyrian Empire, Neo-Babylonian Empire and Achaemenid Empire. The term Syria is in actuality originally a 10th-century BC Indo-Anatolian name for Assyria, centuries later applied by the Greeks during the Seleucid Empire (311–150 BC) not only to Assyria itself but much of the Levant (see Etymology of Syria).

The approach of the devastating Assyrian armies would more often than not result in the vassalage of these states. Similarly, any long absence would result in rebellion, often sponsored by another of Assyria's numerous opponents. The result is that numerous Kings of Assyria launched campaigns to bring these economically important regions under Assyrian rule. The rebellion after one King's offensive would result in his successor's next vengeful assault. When Tyre ceased to pay tribute to the Assyrian kings, rebellion broke out.

== Background ==
Prior to the rise of the Neo-Assyrian Empire in the late 10th century BC, much of the land known today as Syria and Lebanon was ruled by various independent Canaanite speaking city states. Trade established between these cities and those of the Mediterranean gave some of these cities great wealth.

During the Middle Assyrian Empire, after gaining ascendancy over much of the ancient Near East and Asia Minor at the expense of the Hittite Empire, Hurri-Mitanni, Egyptian Empire, Babylonia and Phrygia, the Assyrians turned their attention to the East Mediterranean coast. Tiglath-Pileser I (1115–1077 BC) invaded the region and conquered the Canaanite-Phoenician states of Byblos, Tyre, Sidon, Simyra, Berytus (Beirut), and finally Arwad. However, Assyria went into a period of comparative decline from 1055 BC onwards, its territories shrinking dramatically, and although one Assyrian king is recorded as having campaigned in the region in the late 10th century BC, Phoenicia was essentially lost to Assyria.

King Adad-nirari II (911–891 BC) ascended to the throne and immediately began consolidating the domains of Assyria and punishing rebellious vassals, giving rise to the Neo-Assyrian Empire. After the death of Adad-nirari II, Tukulti-Ninurta II (890–884 BC) began expanding against Assyria's enemies to the north and east in Asia Minor and Ancient Iran. The expansion into the north meant that the next Assyrian King, Ashurnasirpal II (883–859 BC) was in a position to greatly expand Assyria's political and military influence out of Mesopotamia. After crushing the revolt of the city of Suru, invading the Levant and defeating the Aramaean King of Bit Adini and mercilessly mutilating other rebels along the Upper Tigris river, Ashurnasirpal II turned his attention to the West, to the land of the Phoenicians.

== Campaigns of Shalmaneser III, 858–824 BC ==
Shalmaneser was the son of Ashurnasirpal II and like his father, expended much of his energies into fighting and expanding in the name of Ashur. However, while he did campaign for 31 years of his 35 years on the throne, his death was met with unrealized dreams and ultimately civil conflict and another short period of instability within the empire. The cities of Aramea and Canaan once more began to rebel and in 853 BC. Shalmaneser III led an army to cross the Euphrates and into northern Aram. After taking Aleppo, he encountered on the plains of central Syria a coalition of Aramean and Canaanite states, including forces sent by King Ahab of Israel. The outcome of the battle was most likely a stalemate for Shalmaneser III – although some vassal states were brought back into line, and later he campaigned on three more occasions against his opponents in 849, 845 and 838 BC, conquering much of the Levant. He failed to take Damascus but devastated much of its territory however many of the Phoenician cities received a respite from Assyrian attacks during the reign of Shamshi-Adad V and the regent queen Semiramis.

Adad-nirari III proved a vigorous king. Among his actions was a siege of Damascus in the time of Ben-Hadad III in 796 BC, which led to the eclipse of the Aramaean Kingdom of Damascus and allowed the recovery of Israel under Jehoash (who paid the Assyrian king tribute at this time) and Jeroboam II.

== Campaigns of Tiglath Pileser III, 745–727 BC ==
Tiglath Pileser III brought the Assyrian empire out of the period of instability it had entered after the death of Adad-nirari III in 783 BC, much to the fear of Assyria's enemies. His reforms in administration and in the military included the introduction of a standing army (allowing for extensive campaigning and siege warfare), greater lines of communication and supply of horses, metal, arrows and other necessities of war. Upon conquering a new territory, an Assyrian official would be put in charge to supervise and ensure Assyrian interests and tribute were maintained.

With these and with his energetic campaigning, the Levant and many of the Phoenician cities were doomed to lose their independence once again to the brutal yet effective Assyrian armies.

After taking care of the troublesome Chaldean and Sutean tribes who had migrated into Babylonia to the south, and re-affirming Babylon's vassalage to Assyria, Tiglath led a campaign against the northern opponents of Urartu – Urartu had been extending their influence into the eastern Mediterranean by carving out a number of vassal states along the fertile crescent and into southern Canaan. Consequently, Tiglath's moves against Aramea and Canaan served to aid him in his war against Urartu.

Upon hearing of the advancing armies of Assyria, the vassal states in northern Syria called for the forces of Urartu to protect them. In a crushing defeat in the Upper Euphrates Tiglath ensured that no troops would come to their aid; an unsuccessful siege of the capital of Urartu, Turushpa meant that Tiglath concentrated his efforts in the West. The Syrian city of Arpad was placed under siege in 747 BC. While most armies of the time would not be able to lay siege for more than half a year (the seasonal change demanded the soldiers return to their farms and tend to their fields and livestock) the reforms of Tilgath mean that his standing army would take the city in the third year of the siege.

In 738 BC, Tiglath mirrored the moves of his predecessor, Ashurnasirpal II by accepting the tribute of many of the cities in Canaan and Syria. The fruits of the conquests ensured once again a good supply of raw materials to feed the Assyrian war machine. When Tiglath placed a trade embargo on exporting Phoenician cedar to Egypt, Egyptian-backed rebellions broke out throughout the region, all crushed and all made to recognize the suzerainty of nation of Assur.

== Shalmaneser V, 726–722 BC and Sargon II, 721–705 BC ==
=== Sargonid dynasty ===
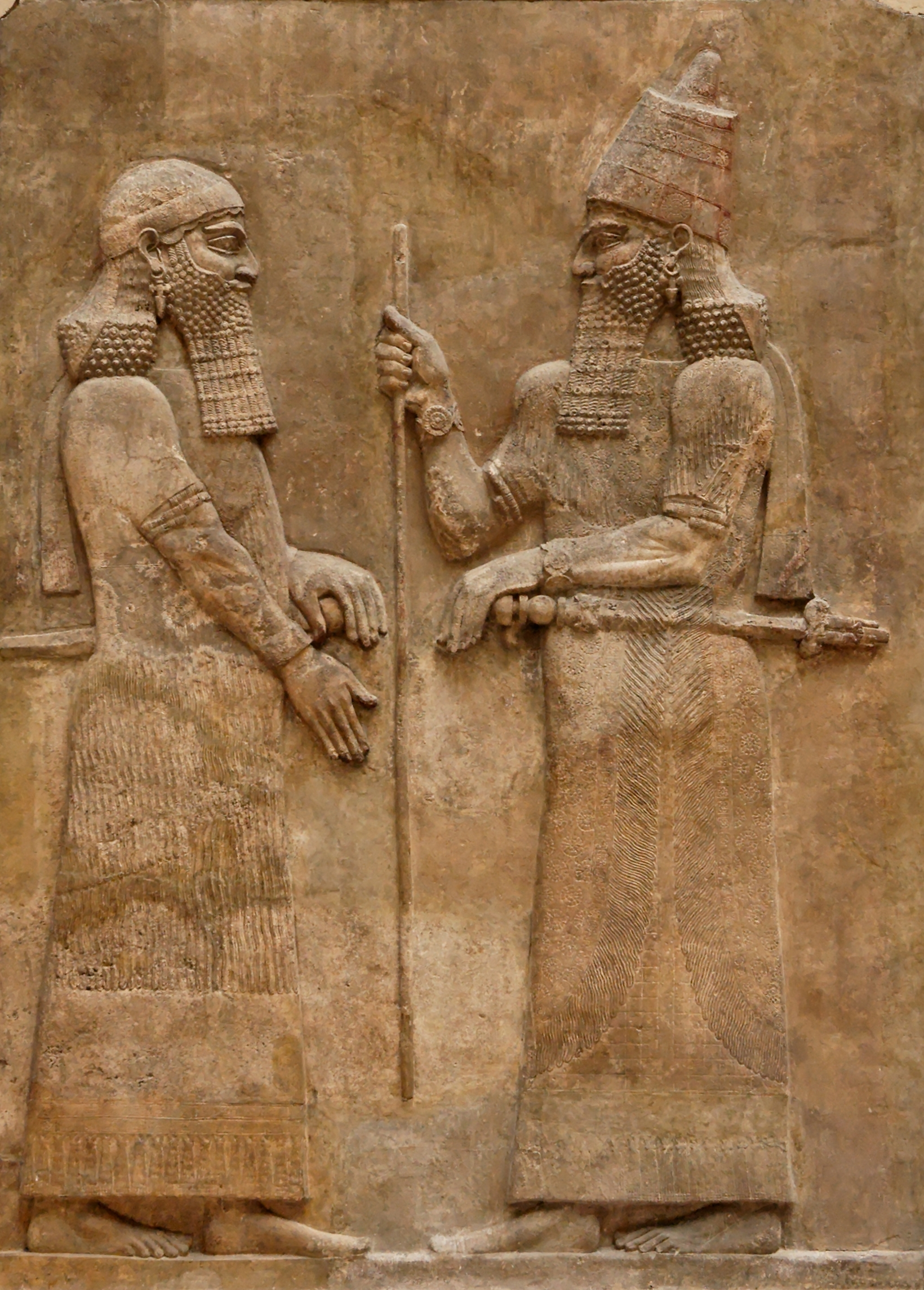
Sargon II (right), king of Assyria (r. 722 – 705 BC), with the crowned prince, Sennacherib (left)

The succession of Sargon II to Tiglath is surrounded by mystery – his campaigns against Babylon mention a previous conquest of Jerusalem, the capital of the Israelite Kingdom of Judah and the mass deportation of some 27,000+ inhabitants to the lands of Media. The most likely result is that another King before Sargon II, Shalmaneser V may have launched campaigns in the provinces of Syria and Palestine before being overthrown by Sargon II – whose rebellion would have encouraged others throughout the Empire, including the secession of Babylon from Assyria vassalage. Sargon II therefore claims the glory of his usurped predecessor's conquest of Israel.

In any case, the Assyrians under Sargon II were once more forced to campaign in the immediate vicinity of Assyria, resulting in an outbreak of rebellion in Syria (no doubt in order to take advantage of the pre-occupied status of the Assyrian army). After defeating her opponents, Sargon II decided to head west rather than completely defeat Elam, being content with reducing her ability to campaign for some time.

The Syrian rebellion was backed by the Egyptians (Hanunu of Gaza was encouraged by them and so rebelled) and led by the ruler of Hamath. The cities of Damascus, Samaria and a few of the Phoenician cities also broke away and allied once again to face the threat of Assyria. The rebellion was ultimately doomed; the coalition lacked the military ability to stop Sargon's rapid advance south. After taking Arpad, Sargon II smashed the coalition army at Qarqar, thereby avenging the stalemate of Shalmaneser III. Hamath fell, followed by Damascus and then Samaria. Sargon then went on to take Gaza where he brushed aside an Egyptian expeditionary force. Hanunu was captured and flayed.

Another attempt by the Egyptians in 712 BC to foment a rebellion failed when Ashdod, the prime mover of this rebellion was defeated by Sargon's pre-emptive action. Thereafter Palestine and much of the Phoenician cities were secure.

Sargon's military expeditions against Urartu and Phrygia allowed him to exert greater influence in northern Syria and Phoenicia.

== Sennacherib, 704–681 BC ==
It is unknown how rebellious the cities of Tyre and other Phoenician cities were under the reign of Sennacherib. It is however known that in 701 BC, Sennacherib marched south down the Mediterranean coast to suppress the rebellions by their Philistine vassals, backed by the kingdom of Judah. After defeating yet another Egyptian expeditionary force, the Philistine cities surrendered and tribute once again offered, with records speaking of bringing many hostile "cities" (some of which were much more like villages) "to embrace his [Sennacherib] feet". This may well have included a number of Phoenician cities in Lebanon. Nonetheless, the vassals in the region would not stop rebelling while Babylon, Elam or Urartu too rebelled against Assyria, and not while Egypt continued to provide aid to the rebels.

== Esarhaddon 680–669 BC ==
Esarhaddon's reconstruction of Babylon and his vassal treaty imposed upon the Persians and Medes allowed him to turn his attention to the rebellious city of Tyre (which had rebelled with Egyptian aid). In 671 BC, Esarhaddon went to war against Pharaoh Taharqa of Egypt, the head of a foreign Nubian dynasty. Part of his army stayed behind to deal with rebellions in Tyre, and perhaps Ashkelon. The remainder went south to Rapihu, then crossed the Sinai, a desert inhabited by dreadful and dangerous animals, and entered Egypt. In the summer, he took Memphis, and Taharqa fled back to Nubia . Esarhaddon now called himself "king of Egypt, Libya, and Kush", and returned with rich booty from the cities of the delta; he erected a victory stele at this time, showing the son of Taharqa in bondage, Prince Ushankhuru.

== Ashurbanipal 668–627 BC ==
Ashurbanipal, a palace relief from Nineveh.

Ashurbanipal would be the last Assyrian King to have the ability to campaign in Phoenicia and much of Aram. Marching his army into Egypt (in order to safeguard Syria) he defeated the rebellious opponents there and installed puppet princes on the throne. Egyptian attempts at taking Memphis ended miserably with Ashurbanipal marching south into Upper Egypt and taking Thebes "like a floodstorm". His campaigning against Egypt coincided with another attempt to stop Tyre and Arvad from rebelling without being punished for it afterwards. With the death of Ashurbanipal in 627 BC, Aramea and Phoenicia gradually fell from Assyrian rule as Assyria was engulfed in bitter civil war which would see its downfall by 605 BC. Ironically, it would be the Assyrians former vassals, the Egyptians, who would attempt to aid the Assyrians as they moved the capital of their collapsing kingdom to Harran.

The destruction of the Assyrian Empire meant that Babylon and then Persia would rule Phoenicia, Canaan and Aramea until Alexander the Great of Macedon would initiate the Hellenistic period.

== See also ==
- Military history of the Neo-Assyrian Empire
- Persian Empire
- Assyrians and Syriacs in Lebanon
