= Canaanite and Aramaic inscriptions =

The Canaanite and Aramaic inscriptions, also known as Northwest Semitic inscriptions, are the primary extra-Biblical sources for understanding of the societies and histories of Phoenicia, the Israelites, and the Arameans, which includes groups within the Northwest Semitic languages. Northwest Semitic contains the Aramaic and Canaanite languages; the latter groups includes Phoenician—Punic, the Ammonite language, and Hebrew.

Semitic inscriptions may occur on stone slabs, ostraca, and ornaments and range from simple names to full texts.

The oldest inscriptions form a dialect continuum that includes Canaanite languages and Aramaic, exemplified by writings which scholars have struggled to fit into either category, such as the Stele of Zakkur and the Deir Alla inscription.

== Languages ==
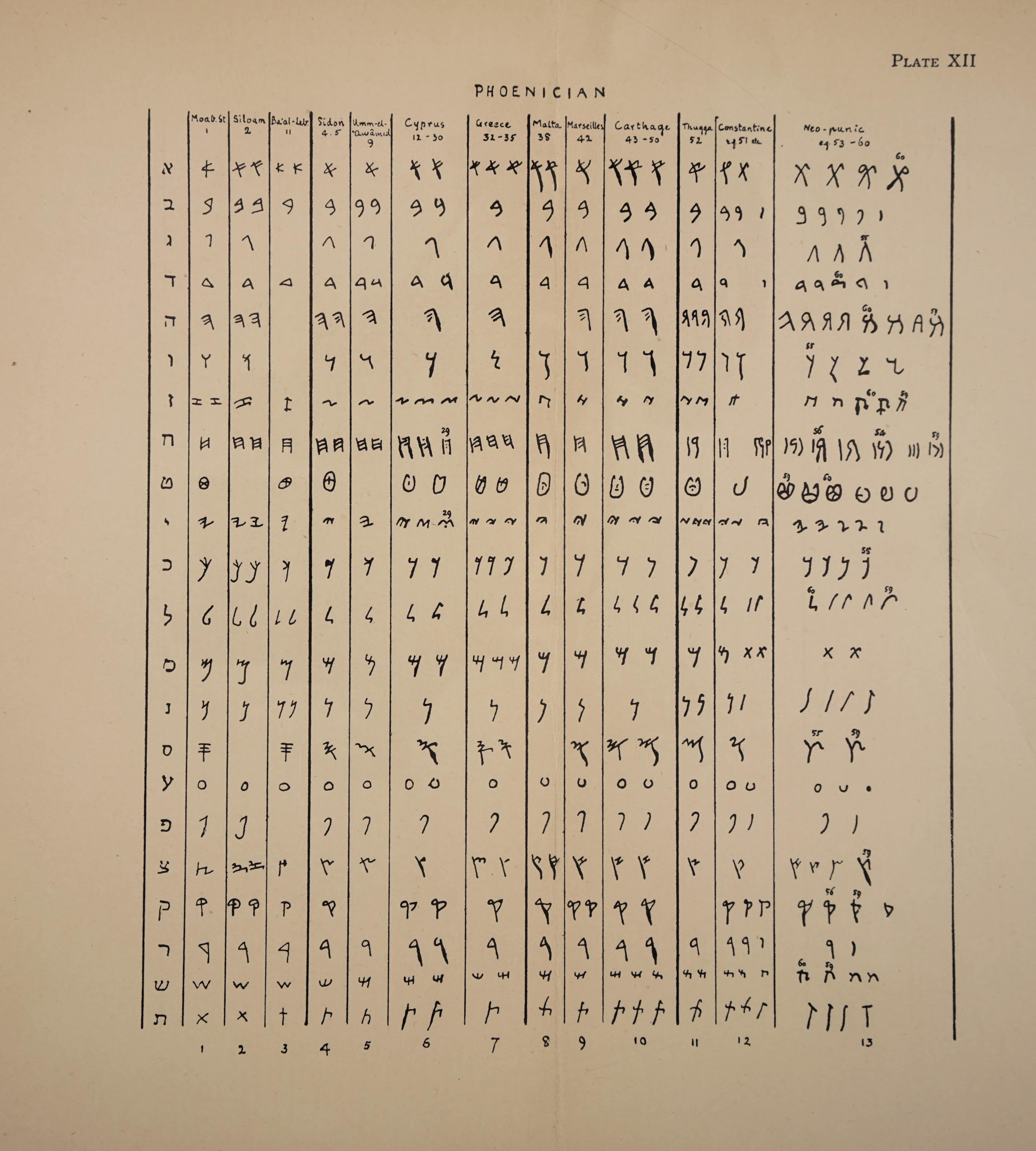
Phoenician alphabet

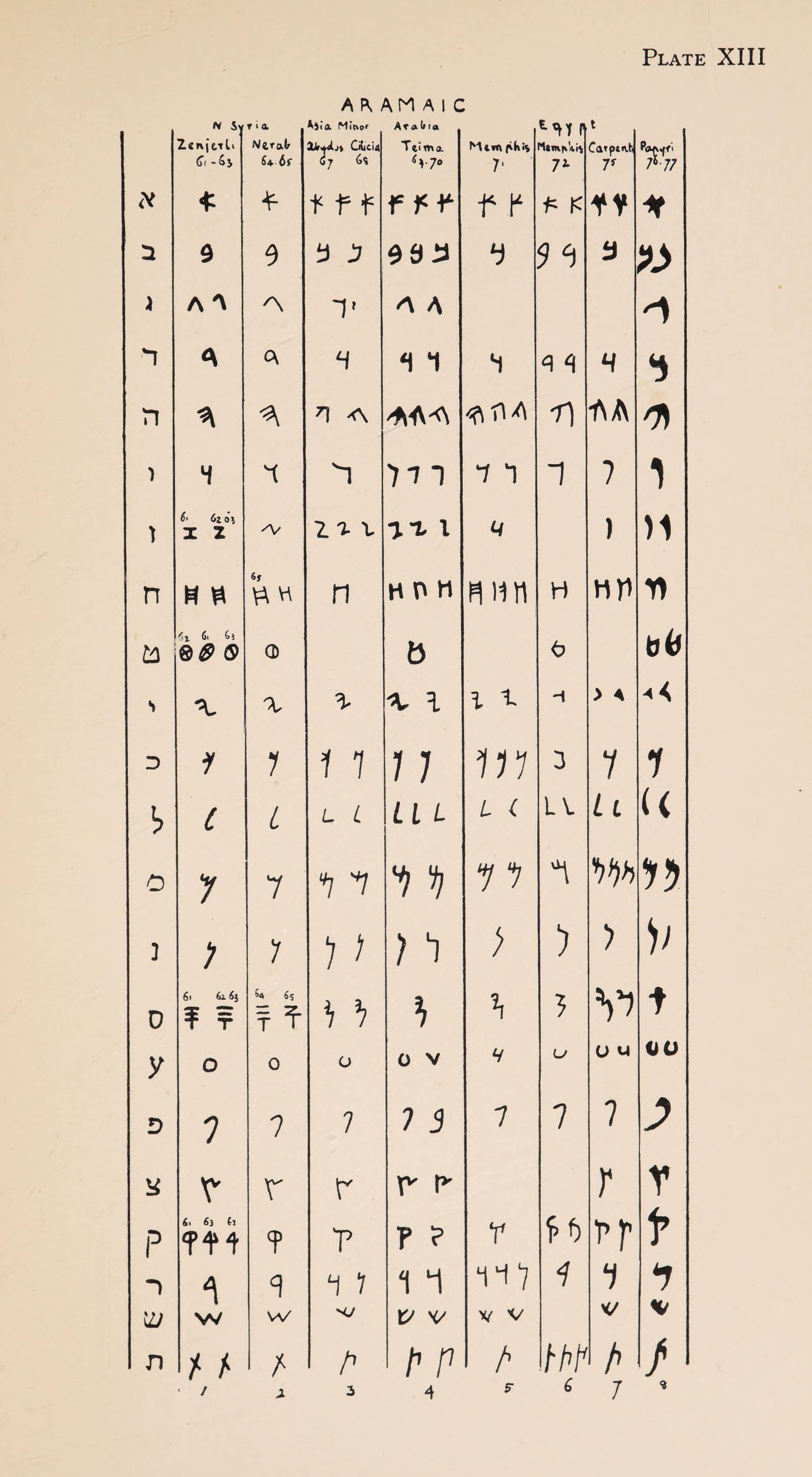
Aramaic alphabet

This article lists the notable inscriptions written in ancient Northwest Semitic scripts. The labels used for these scripts have changed over time: Canaanite scripts were previously known as "Phoenician", whilst today are split into Phoenician-proper, Punic and paleo-Hebrew etc.; Aramaic scripts are also often split into subdivisions such as Old Aramaic, Imperial Aramaic, Palmyrene, Hatran etc. These scripts are all closely related, as shown in these 1903 comparison tables.

The Old Aramaic period (850–612 BC) saw increased production and dispersal of inscriptions — not because the Arameans formed a dominant empire, but because their language was increasingly adopted as a regional lingua franca. Their language was adopted as an international language of diplomacy, particularly in the late Neo-Assyrian Empire when it spread throughout the Near East—including Egypt (in administration) and Mesopotamia (where it became natively spoken). The first known Aramaic inscription was the Carpentras Stele, found in southern France in 1704; it was considered to be Phoenician text at the time.

Only 10,000 inscriptions in Phoenician-Punic, a Canaanite language, are known, such that "Phoenician probably remains the worst transmitted and least known of all Semitic languages." The only other substantial source for Phoenician-Punic are the excerpts in Poenulus, a play written by the Roman writer Plautus (see Punic language § Example for an analysis). Within the corpus of inscriptions only 668 words have been attested, including 321 hapax legomena (words only attested a single time), per Wolfgang Röllig's analysis in 1983. This compares to the Bible's 7,000–8,000 words and 1,500 hapax legomena, in Biblical Hebrew. The first published Phoenician-Punic inscription was from the Cippi of Melqart, found in 1694 in Malta; the first published such inscription from the Phoenician "homeland" was the Sarcophagus of Eshmunazar II published in 1855.

Fewer than 2,000 inscriptions in Ancient Hebrew, another Canaanite language, are known, of which the vast majority comprise just a single letter or word. The first detailed Ancient Hebrew inscription published was the Royal Steward inscription, found in 1870.

== List of notable inscriptions ==
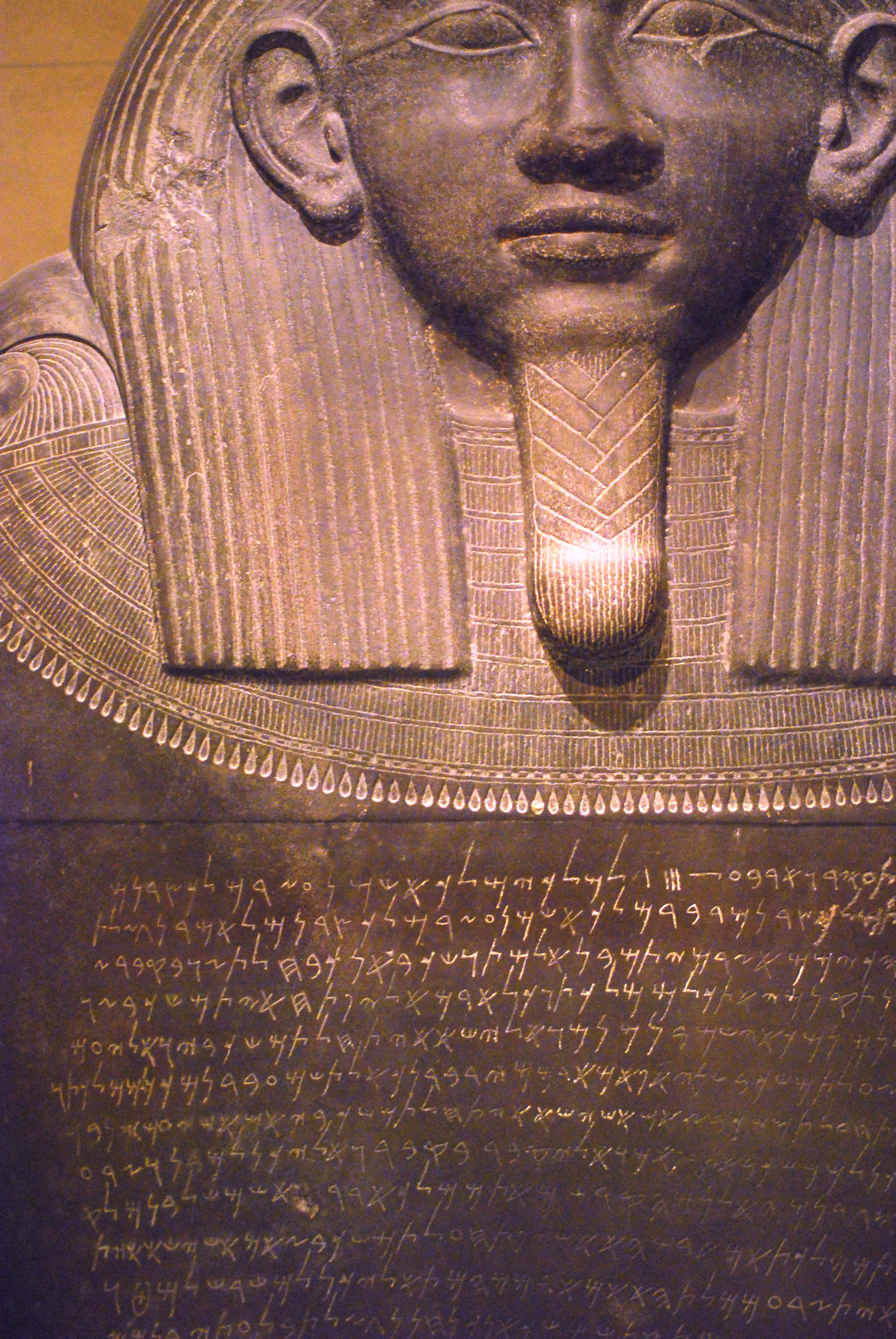
The Sarcophagus of Eshmunazar II was the first of this type of inscription found anywhere in the Levant (modern Jordan, Israel, Lebanon, Palestine and Syria).

=== Corpora ===
The inscriptions written in ancient Northwest Semitic script (Canaanite and Aramaic) have been catalogued into multiple corpora (i.e., lists) over the last two centuries. The primary corpora to have been produced are as follows:

Abbreviation	Authors	Date	Title	Description
Ham.	Hendrik Arent Hamaker	1828	Miscellanea Phoenicia.	Assessed 13 inscriptions, including one Aramaic
Ges.	Wilhelm Gesenius	1837	Scripturae Linguaeque Phoeniciae	Only c.80 inscriptions and 60 coins were known in the entire corpus, including 5 Aramaic inscriptions
Schr.	Paul Schröder	1869	Die phönizische Sprache. Entwurf einer Grammatik, nebst Sprach- und Schriftproben.	The first study of Phoenician grammar; listed 332 texts known at the time
CIS	—	1881–1962	Corpus Inscriptionum Semiticarum	Intended to contain all ancient inscriptions written in "Semitic characters".
NE	Mark Lidzbarski	1898	Handbuch der Nordsemitischen Epigraphik	—
KI	Mark Lidzbarski	1907	Kanaanäische Inschriften (moabitisch, althebräisch, phönizisch, punisch).	—
NSI	George Albert Cooke	1903	Text-book of North-Semitic Inscriptions: Moabite, Hebrew, Phoenician, Aramaic, Nabataean, Palmyrene, Jewish	—
KAI	Herbert Donner, Wolfgang Röllig	1960–2002	Kanaanäische und Aramäische Inschriften	Considered the "gold standard" for the last fifty years
TSSI	John Clark Love Gibson	1971–1982	Textbook of Syrian Semitic Inscriptions.	—
TAD	Bezalel Porten, Ada Yardeni	1986–2000	Textbook of Aramaic Documents from Ancient Egypt	—
HAE	Johannes Renz, Wolfgang Röllig	1995	Handbuch der althebräischen Epigraphik.	—
HNPI	Karel Jongeling	2008	Handbook of Neo-Punic Inscriptions.	—

=== Inscriptions ===
The inscriptions listed below include those which are mentioned in multiple editions of the corpora above (the numbers in the concordance column cross-refer to the works above), as well as newer inscriptions which have been published since the corpora above were published (references provided individually). They are ordered chronologically by date of their modern discovery, illustrating the development of the study of ancient Semitic epigraphy.

Name	Image	Discovered	No. units	Est. Date	Location found	Current Location	Concordance						
Name	Image	Discovered	No. units	Est. Date	Location found	Current Location	KAI	CIS / RÉS	NE	KI	NSI	TSSI	Oth. ref.
Palmyrene inscriptions	An inscription	1616 onwards	>3,500		Palmyra and other	various		II 3901-4211	457-483		110-147	IV 28-45	
Nabataean inscriptions	Inscriptions	1616 onwards	6,000–7,000		Sinai and other	various		II 157-1471	448-457		78-107	IV 1-18	
Punic-Libyan bilinguals	An inscription	1631	2		Dougga	British Museum	100–101		433,c	93	52		
Cippi of Melqart	An inscription	1694	2	100s BC	Malta	Louvre and National Museum of Archaeology, Malta	47	I 122	425f	53	36		
Carpentras Stele	An inscription	1704	1		Carpentras	Bibliothèque Inguimbertine	269	II 141	448b1		75	II 24	
Pococke Kition inscriptions	An inscription	1738	31	300s BC	Cyprus	Ashmolean Museum	33, 35	I 11, 46, 57–85	420,4	19, 23, 27, 28	13, 16, 18, 19	III 35	
Benhisa inscription	An inscription	1761	1		Malta	Cabinet des Médailles		I 124	426,3	55			
Phoenician Harpocrates statues	An inscription	1770, 1963	2		unknown	National Archaeological Museum (Madrid) and British Museum	52	R 1507	424	44		III 37, 38	
Nora Stone	An inscription	1773	1		Sardinia	Museo Archeologico Nazionale di Cagliari	46	I 144	427c	60	41	III 11	
Canaanite and Aramaic seal inscriptions	An inscription	1791 onwards	>1,600		various	various			445,3	2, 4	150		
Athenian Greek-Phoenician inscriptions	An inscription	1795 etc.	18		Athens, Piraeus	British Museum, Louvre, National Archaeological Museum, Athens, Archaeological Museum of Piraeus	53–60	I 115–120, R 388, 1215	424,1–3, 425,1–5	45–52	32–35	III 40–41	
Tripolitania Punic inscriptions	An inscription	1806			Leptis Magna, Breviglieri, other		118–132	R 662	434, B-a				
Elephantine papyri and ostraca	An inscription	1815–1945		300s BC	Elephantine	various	270–271	II 137–139, 154–155			73–74	II 26, 28	
Mdina steles	An inscription	1816	2		Malta	National Museum of Archaeology, Malta	61	I 123A–B	426,2	54	37	III 21,22	
Carthaginian tombstones	Inscription sketches	1817 onwards			Carthage	Carthage National Museum, others	85	various		74			
Humbert Carthage inscriptions		1817-23	7		Carthage	Rijksmuseum van Oudheden		I 173, I 186-187, I 240, I 439-440	431, 9; 432, 16				
Turin Aramaic Papyrus	An inscription	1823–24	1			Museo Egizio		II 144					
Blacas papyrus	An inscription	1825	1		Saqqara	British Library		II 145			76		
Falbe Punic inscriptions		1831	3		Carthage	Copenhagen University museum, British Museum		I 199	431, 10	75			
Reade Punic inscriptions	An inscription	1836-37	4		Carthage, Maghrawa		179, 441, 442						
Limyra bilingual	An inscription	1840	1		Limyra		262	II 109	446b				
Abu Simbel Phoenician graffiti	An set of inscriptions	1842			Abu Simbel	in situ		I 111-113	423b	43			
Ain Nechma inscriptions	An inscription	1843	40		Guelma	Louvre	166–169		437		58		
Kellia inscription	An inscription	1844	1		Cyprus		36	I 47	420,5	24	17		
Marseille Tariff	An inscription	1845	1	300s BC	Marseille	Musée d'archéologie méditerranéenne	69	I 165	428	63	42		
Nimrud ivory inscriptions	An inscription	1845, 1961			Nimrud	British Museum						I 6	
Assyrian lion weights	An inscription	1845–1860		800–500 BC	Nimrud, Abydos (Hellespont)	British Museum, Louvre	263	II 1–14, 108	446c		66-67		
Phoenician metal bowls	An inscription	1849 onwards	c. 5-10	700s BC	Nimrud, Cyprus, Italy and others	various		I 164, II 46–49				III 19	
Anat Athena bilingual	An inscription	1850	1	312 BCE	Cyprus	in situ	42	I 95, R 1515	422,1	35	28		
Puteoli Nabataean inscriptions	An inscription	1851	2	1st CE	Pozzuoli	National Archaeological Museum, Naples		II 157-158			102		
Bourgade inscriptions	An inscription	1852	c. 40		Maghrawa		133–135		436,3–12		54		
Sarcophagus of Eshmunazar II	An inscription	1855	1	c. 525 BC	Sidon	Louvre	14	I 3, R 1506	417,2	7	5	III 28	
Gozo stele	An inscription	1855	1		Malta	Gozo Museum of Archaeology	62	I 132	426,4	56	38		
Serapeum Offering Table	An inscription	1855	1	400 BC	Saqqara	Louvre	268	II 123	448a2		72		
Cirta steles	An inscription	1857–61, 1875, 1950	c. 1,000	300-100BCE	Constantine	Musée national Cirta	102–116, 162–164	R 327, 334, 339, 1544	433,1–9 and 434,10–12	94–99	51		
Carthage Tariff	An inscription	1856-58	1	300 BC	Carthage	British Museum	74	I 167	429b	66	43		
Son of Baalshillek marble base	An inscription	1856-58	1		Carthage	British Museum	84	I 178	430,7	73			
Carthage tower model		1856-58	1		Carthage	British Museum		I 181	432, 14		48		
Bodashtart inscriptions	An inscription	1858, 1900-2	22-24	300s BC	Sidon	Louvre and Museum of the Ancient Orient	15–16	I 4, R 766, 767		8–10	6, Appendix I		
Kition Resheph pillars	An inscription	1860	2	341 BC	Cyprus	Louvre	32	I 10, 88	420,1	18, 30	12, 23		
Ankh-Hapy stele	An inscription	1860	1	525–404 BCE	unknown	Vatican Museums	272	II 142	448b2			II 7	
Pauli Gerrei trilingual inscription	An inscription	1861	1		Sardinia	Turin Archaeology Museum	66	I 143	427b	59	40		
Baalshamin inscription	An inscription	1861	1	132 BC	Umm al-Amad	Louvre	18	I 7	418,d	12	9		
Phoenician sun dial	An inscription	1860–1945	1		Umm al-Amad	National Museum of Beirut		I 9					
Umm al-Amad votive inscription	An inscription	1861	1		Umm al-Amad, Lebanon	Louvre		I 8	419,2	13			
Sadda sarcophagus	An inscription	1863	1		Jerusalem	Louvre		II 156					
Cesnola Phoenician inscriptions	An inscription	1865-71	28		Kition	Metropolitan Museum of Art		I 14-39, RES 1521-34					
Khaznadar inscriptions	An inscription	1866-69	c. 120		Carthage	Bardo National Museum (Tunis), Louvre	88	various	431,11-13, 431,15	82-84			
Hadrumetum Punic inscriptions	An inscription	1867, 1946	12		Sousse	Hermitage Museum, Sousse Archaeological Museum, the Louvre and the Maison méditerranéenne des Sciences de l'homme	97–99		432,1–3	91–92			
Mesha Stele	An inscription	1868	1		Dhiban	Louvre	181		415	1	1	I 16	
Abydos graffiti	An set of inscriptions	1868			Abydos	in situ	49	I 99–110, R 1302ff.	423a	38-42	31		
Idalion bilingual and Idalion Temple inscriptions	An inscription	1869	6	391–254 BC	Idalion, Cyprus	British Museum	38–40	I 89–94	421,1–3	31–33	24–27	III 34	
Yehawmilk Stele	An inscription	1869	1	c.450/425 BCE	Byblos	Louvre	10	I 1	416	5	3	III 25	
Tharros Punic inscriptions	An inscription	1870	14		Sardinia	Museo Archeologico Nazionale di Cagliari, Museo nazionale archeologico ed etnografico G. A. Sanna	67	I 153-161		61-62			
Royal Steward inscription	An inscription	1870	1		Jerusalem	British Museum	191					I 8	
Carthaginian slaughterhouse inscription	An inscription	1871	1		Carthage	British Museum	80	I 175	430,4	68	46		
Carthaginian mother goddess inscription	An inscription	1871	1		Carthage		83	I 177	430,6	72	47		
Carthage Festival Offering inscription	An inscription	1872	1	300 BC	Carthage	Turin Archaeology Museum	76	I 166	430,3	67	44		
Wilmanns Neopunic inscriptions	An inscription	1873-74	5		Tunisia	Louvre and Vorderasiatisches Museum Berlin	139, 142, 159		435,2, 437a		53, 55		
Pricot de Sainte-Marie steles	An inscription	1874–75	>2,000		Carthage	Bibliothèque nationale de France, Louvre	86–87	I c.200–c.2000		76-80	49		
Cherchell Neopunic inscriptions	An inscription	1875, 1882	2		Cherchell	Louvre	161		439,2		56–57		
Bashamem inscription	An inscription	1877	1	200 BC	Sardinia	Museo Archeologico Nazionale di Cagliari	64	I 139	427a	58	39		
Baal Lebanon inscription	An inscription	1877	1	700s BC	Cyprus	Cabinet des Médailles	31	I 5	419	17	11	III 17	
Saqqara Aramaic Stele	An inscription	1877	1	482 BC	Saqqara	destroyed	267	II 122	448a1		71	II 23	
Tayma stones	An inscription	1878–1884	21	300s–400s BC	Tayma	Louvre	228–230	II 113–115	447,1–3		69–70	II 30	
Kition Tariffs	An inscription	1879	2	300s BC	Cyprus	British Museum	37	I 86A–B, 87		29	20	III 33	
Adadnadinakhe bricks	An inscription	1880s	20+	300-100 BC	Girsu	Louvre, Vorderasiatisches Museum Berlin		II 72	446c				
Siloam inscription	An inscription	1880	1		Jerusalem	Museum of the Ancient Orient	189			3	2	I 7	
Sant'Antioco bilingual	An inscription	1881	1		Sardinia	Museo archeologico comunale Ferruccio Barreca	172	I 149	434,1	100	60		
Palmyra Tariff	An inscription	1881	1	100s CE	Palmyra	Hermitage Museum							
Osorkon Bust	An inscription	1881	1	c.920 BC	Byblos	Louvre	6					III 8	
Pierides Kition inscriptions	An inscription	1881	7		Cyprus	Louvre		12, 13, 14, 50–53		20, 25–26	14		
Eshmun obelisk	An inscription	1881	1		Cyprus	British Museum		I 44	420,2	21	15		
Persephone Punic stele	An inscription	1881	1		Carthage	Turin Archaeology Museum	82	I 176		71			
Lilybaeum stele	An inscription	1882	1		Sicily	Regional Archeological Museum Antonio Salinas	63	I 138		57			
Henchir Guergour Neopunic inscriptions	An inscription	1882			Tunisia		143–144						
Guelaât Bou Sbaâ Neopunic inscriptions	An inscription	1884			Algeria		165						
Hegra Nabataean inscriptions		1884-85			Hegra			II 197-334			78-93	IV 7-8	
Tyre Cistern inscription	An inscription	1885	1		Tyre	Louvre			418,c		8		
Tamassos bilinguals	An inscription	1885	2	363 BC	Tamassos, Cyprus	British Museum	41	R 1212–1213	421c	34	30		
Masub inscription	An inscription	1885	1	222 BC	Masub	Louvre	19	R 1205	419e	16	10	III 31	
Tabnit sarcophagus	An inscription	1887	1	500 BC	Sidon	Museum of the Ancient Orient	13	R 1202	417,1	6	4	III 27	
Panamuwa II inscription	An inscription	1888	1	730s BC	Sam'al	Vorderasiatisches Museum Berlin	215		442		62	II 14	
Stele of Ördek-Burnu	an inscription	1888	1	800s BC	Sam'al	Museum of the Ancient Orient							
Madaba Nabataean Inscriptions	An inscription	1889	1	37 CE	Madaba	Louvre and Vatican Museums		II 196			96	IV 9	
Hadad Statue	An inscription	1890	1	700s BC	Sam'al	Vorderasiatisches Museum Berlin	214		440-2		61	II 13	
Abdmiskar cippus	An inscription	1890	1	300 BCE	Sidon	Louvre	282	R 930	418,3	11	7		
Abdbaal the centurion inscription		1890s	1		near Tyre	Louvre							
Maktar and Mididi inscriptions	An inscription	1890s	>150		Maktar and Mididi		145–158	R 161–181, 2221	436,11		59a-c		
Bar-Rakib inscriptions	An inscription	1891	8	730s BC	Sam'al	Vorderasiatisches Museum Berlin and Museum of the Ancient Orient	216–221		443, 444		63	II 15–17	
Neirab steles	An inscription	1891	2	600s BC	Al-Nayrab	Louvre	225–226		445,1-2		64–65	II 18–19	
Sarıaydın inscription	An inscription	1892	1	400 BC	Sarıaydın	in situ	261		446a		68	II 35	
Larnakas tis Lapithou pedestal inscription	An inscription	1893	1	275 BCE	Cyprus	Louvre	43	R 1211	422,2	36	29	III 36	
Kilamuwa Stela	An inscription	1893	1	c. 850/825 BCE	Sam'al	Vorderasiatisches Museum Berlin	24					III 13	
Hasanbeyli inscription	An inscription	1894	1		Hasanbeyli	Vorderasiatisches Museum Berlin	23						
Kition Necropolis Phoenician inscriptions	An inscription	1894	4	300s BC	Cyprus	British Museum, Cyprus Museum, Ashmolean Museum	34	R 1206	420,3	22	21-22		
Douïmès medallion	An inscription	1894	1	700 BCE	Carthage	Carthage National Museum	73	I 6057, R 5	429,1	70			
El Amrouni mausoleum	An inscription	1894	1		Remada		117		435b	101			
Abiba’l inscription	An inscription	1895	1	c.940/930 BCE	Byblos	Vorderasiatisches Museum Berlin	5	R 505				III 7	
Arebsun inscriptions	An inscription	1895	1		Gülşehir	Museum of the Ancient Orient	264	R 1785					
Tortosa bomos inscription		1896	1		Tortosa, Syria	Louvre		R 56					
El-Osiris inscription		1896	1		Umm al-Amad	Louvre		R 504					
Avignon Punic inscription	An inscription	1897	1		Avignon	Musée d'archéologie méditerranéenne	70	R 360		64		III 18	
Astarte and Tabit sanctuary dedication	An inscription	1898	1	200 BC	Carthage	Carthage National Museum	81	I 3914		69	45		
Punic Tabella Defixionis	An inscription	1899	1	200 BC	Carthage	Carthage National Museum	89	I 6068, R 18, 1590		85	50		
		1899			Carthage	Carthage National Museum	91	I 5991, R 1227		88			
Quintus Markius trilingual inscription	An inscription	1899	1	middle of 1st century BC	Henchir-Alouin (near Uthina)	Louvre		R 79					
Farasa bilingual inscription	An inscription	1900	1			In situ	265						
Phoenician Adoration steles	An inscription	1900	1		Umm al-Amad, Lebanon	Ny Carlsberg Glyptotek, Louvre		R 250, R 307		14–15			
Banobal stele	An inscription	1900	1		Memphis	Egyptian Museum	48	R 1, 235		37			
		1900			Bou Arada		140	R 679					
		1901			Carthage		96	I 5988, R 183, 1600					
Eshmun inscription	An inscription	1901	1		Sidon	Museum of the Ancient Orient		R 297					
Sibbolet funeral inscription	An inscription	1902	1		Carthage	Carthage National Museum	92	I 5948, R 768		89			
Stele of Zakkur	An inscription	1903	1		Tell Afis	Louvre	202					II 5	
Villaricos Phoenician stele	An inscription	1903-04	1		Villaricos	National Archaeological Museum (Madrid)				65			
Assur ostracon and tablets	An inscription	1903–1913	10		Assur	Vorderasiatisches Museum Berlin	233-6					II 20	
Baal Hannon tomb inscription	An inscription	1904			Carthage	Carthage National Museum	90	I 5953, R 537		87			
	An inscription	1905			Carthage	Carthage National Museum	93	I 5950, R 553		90			
		1906			Carthage		77	I 3921					
Lake Sivan inscriptions		1906			Armenia		274–275						
		1906			Carthage		95	R 786, 1854					
Throne of Astarte	An inscription	1907	1		Tyre	Louvre and National Museum of Beirut	17	R 800				III 30	
	An inscription	1907	1		Carthage		94	I 2992					
Gözne Boundary Stone	An inscription	1907	1		Gözne		259					II 34	
Thinissut sanctuary inscription	An inscription	1908	1		Bir Bouregba	Nabeul Museum	137	R 942, 1858					
Gezer calendar	An inscription	1908	1		Gezer	Museum of the Ancient Orient	182	R 1201				I 1	
Samaria Ostraca	An inscription	1910	102		Sebastia	Museum of the Ancient Orient	183–188					I 2–3	
Olbia pedestal	An inscription	1911	1		Sardinia		68	R 1216					
Giardino Birocchi inscription	An inscription	1912	1		Sardinia	Museo Archeologico Nazionale di Cagliari	65						
Sardis bilingual inscription	An inscription	1912	1	394 BC	Sardis	İzmir Archaeological Museum	260						
Rhodes Phoenician-Greek bilingual inscriptions	An inscription	1914–68	3	300–200 BCE	Rhodes	Archaeological Museum of Rhodes	44–45					III 39	
Bur Tlelsa Neopunic inscription		1914	1		Tunisia		138						
Kesecek Köyü inscription	An inscription	1915	1		Kesecek Köyü	Peabody Museum of Natural History	258					II 33	
Aramaic Inscription of Taxila	An inscription	1915	1		Taxila	Taxila Museum	273						
Arwad bilingual	An inscription	1916	1		Arwad	Louvre							
Zattara Neopunic inscriptions		1916			Algeria		171						
Mitsri genealogy inscription	An inscription	1922	1	300s BCE	Carthage		78	I 3778					
		1920			Carthage		75	I 3916					
KNMY inscription	An inscription	1922	1		Carthage		79	I 3785					
Ibiza Phoenician inscriptions		1923				Archaeological Museum of Alicante	72						
Ahiram Sarcophagus	An inscription	1923	1	c.1000 BCE	Byblos	National Museum of Beirut	1					III 4	
Byblos Necropolis graffito	An inscription	1923	1	c.1000 BCE	Byblos	in situ	2					III 5	
Byblos altar inscription	An inscription	1923	1	200–100 BCE	Byblos	National Museum of Beirut	12						
Ophel ostracon	An inscription	1924	1		Jerusalem	Rockefeller Museum	190					I 9	
Phoenician arrowheads	An inscription	1926 onwards	c. 70	11th century BCE	various	various	20–22					III p. 6	
Ur Box inscription	An inscription	1927	1		Ur	British Museum	29					III 20	
Byblos bronze spatulas	An inscription	1926–1932	1		Byblos	National Museum of Beirut	3					III 1	
Abda sherd	An inscription	1926–1932	1	c.900 BCE	Byblos		8					III 10	
Son of Safatba'al inscription	An inscription	1926–1932	1	c.500/475 BCE	Byblos	National Museum of Beirut	9						
Batnoam sarcophagus	An inscription	1926–1932	1	c.450–425 BCE	Byblos	National Museum of Beirut	11					III 26	
Sirte inscription		1928	1		Sirte		180						
Yehimilk inscription	An inscription	1930	1	c.960/950 BCE	Byblos	Byblos Castle	4					III 6	
Sefire steles	An inscription	1930–1956	3		As-Safira	National Museum of Damascus and National Museum of Beirut	222–224, 227					II 8–9, 22	
Arslan Tash ivory inscription	An inscription	1931	1		Arslan Tash	Louvre	232					II 2	
Hama graffiti		1931–38			Hama		203–213					II 6 I–V	
Pul-i-Darunteh Aramaic inscription	An inscription	1932	1	c.260 BCE	Afghanistan	in situ							
Arslan Tash amulets	An inscription	1933	2		Arslan Tash	National Museum of Aleppo	27					III 23–24	
Tell Halaf inscription	An inscription	1933	1		Tell Halaf	destroyed	231					II 10	
Bithia inscription		1933	1		Sardinia		173						
Agrigentum inscription	An inscription	1934	1	406 BCE	Carthage		302	I 5510					
Lachish letters	An inscription	1935	1		Tel Lachish	British Museum and Israel Museum	192–199					I 12	
Safatba'al inscription	An inscription	1936	1	c.900 BCE	Byblos	National Museum of Beirut	7					III 9	
Hermopolis Aramaic papyri	An inscription	1936	8	400s BC	Hermopolis	Cairo University Archaeological Museum						II 27	
Phoenician papyrus letters	An inscription	1937–1940	2		Cairo and Saqqara	Egyptian Museum	50–51						
Melqart stele	An inscription	1939	1		Bureij	National Museum of Aleppo	201					II 1	
Honeyman inscription	An inscription	1939	1	900 BCE	Cyprus	Cyprus Museum	30					III 12	
Stele of Serapeitis	An inscription	1940	1		Armazi	Georgian National Museum	276						
Jebel Massoudj Neopunic inscription		1940	1		Tunisia		141						
Adon Papyrus	An inscription	1942	1		Saqqara	Egyptian Museum	266					II 21	
Kilamuwa scepter	An inscription	1943	1		Sam'al		25					III 14	
Tel Qasile ostraca	An inscription	1945–1946	2		Tel Qasile	Israel Museum						I 4	
Karatepe bilingual	An inscription	1946	1	c. 750 BCE	Karatepe	Karatepe-Aslantaş Open-Air Museum	26					III 15	
Tel el Maskhuta silver bowls		1950s			Tel el Maskhuta							II 25	
Pumayyaton and Pnytarion's inscriptions		1950s	1	c. 327 BC	near Dromolaxia, Cyprus	Larnaca District Archaeological Museum (n. 1425)							
Byblos clay cone inscriptions	An inscription	1950	2	1100–1000 BCE	Byblos	National Museum of Beirut						III 2,3	
Carchemish Phoenician inscription	An inscription	1950	1		Carchemish	British Museum	28						
Hatran inscriptions	An inscription	1937	>450		Hatra		237–257					IV 64-80	
Djinet Neopunic inscriptions		1952			Algeria		170						
Wadi Murabba'at papyrus		1952		600s BC	Wadi Murabba'at							I 11	
KAI 136 (Neopunic)		1955			Tunisia		136						
Hazor inscriptions		1956		800s BC	Tel Hazor							I 5	
Al Jib jar handles	An inscription	1956–1959	>60	700s BC	Al Jib	Jordan Archaeological Museum and the Penn Museum						I 14	
Byblos marble inscription	An inscription	1957	1	500 BCE	Byblos	National Museum of Beirut	280						
Hashub Inscription	An inscription	1957	1	400s BCE	Tel Zeton	Old Jaffa Museum of Antiquities							
Kubaba Aramaic inscription		1957	1		Bahadırlı		278					II 36	
El-Kerak Inscription	An inscription	1958	1		Al-Karak	Jordan Archaeological Museum	306					I 17	
Kandahar Bilingual Rock Inscription	An inscription	1958	1		Chil Zena	National Museum of Afghanistan	279						
Yavne-Yam ostracon	An inscription	1960	1		Mesad Hashavyahu	Israel Museum	200					I 10	
Arad ostraca	An inscription	1960s	>200	c.600 BC	Tel Arad	Bible Lands Museum						I 13, II 31	
Temple of Antas Punic inscriptions		1960s			Sardinia		299–301						
Nebi Yunis ostraca	An inscription	1960s			Nebi Yunis (Ashdod)							II 32	
Tel Dan bowl		1960s	1		Tel Dan							II 4	
Seville statue of Astarte	An inscription	1960–1962	1	700 BCE	Seville	Archeological Museum of Seville	294					III 16	
Khirbet Beit Lei graffiti	An inscription	1961	7	400s BC	Khirbet Beit Lei	Israel Museum						I 15	
Amman Citadel Inscription	An inscription	1961	1		Amman	Jordan Archaeological Museum	307						
Ein Gev jar		1961			Ein Gev							II 3	
Cadiz Phoenician gold ring inscription		1961				Instituto Valencia of Don Juan	71						
Phoenician Sphinx inscription	An inscription	1962	1		Umm al-Amad	National Museum of Beirut						III 32	
Baalshillem Temple Boy	An inscription	1963–1964	1		Sidon	National Museum of Beirut	281					III 29	
Abydos Aramaic papyrus	An inscription	1964	1	400s BC	unknown	National Archaeological Museum of Madrid						II 29	
Pyrgi Tablets	An inscription	1964	3		Pyrgi	National Etruscan Museum	277					III 42	
Carthage Administration Inscription	An inscription	1964	1		Carthage	Carthage National Museum	303						
Luristan Aramaic inscriptions		1964			Luristan							II 11–12	
Daskyleion steles	An inscription	1965			Dascylium	Museum of the Ancient Orient	318					II 37	
Mozia Punic inscriptions		1967			Sicily		296–298						
Deir Alla Inscription	An inscription	1967	1		Deir Alla	Jordan Archaeological Museum	312						
Kition inscribed bowl		1969	1	800-850 BCE	Kition	Cyprus Museum							
Grotta Regina Punic inscriptions		1969			Sicily		295						
Kition KAI 288–290		1970s-80s			Kition		288–290						
Tekke Bowl Inscription (Knossos)		1970s		1,000s BCE	Crete	Heraklion Archaeological Museum (Χ4346)	291						
Aramaic Sustenance tablet		1970s					316						
Aramaic inscription of Laghman	An inscription	1970	1	c.260 BCE	Afghanistan	in situ							
Aramaic Fugitive Decree		1971			Unknown		317						
Tel Siran inscription	An inscription	1972	1		Amman	Jordan Archaeological Museum	308						
Letoon trilingual	An inscription	1973	1		Xanthos	Fethiye Museum	319						
Aramaic inscription from al-Mal		1973		7/6 BC	al-Mal								
Tell Sheikh Hamad inscriptions		1978–1980s			Tell Sheikh Hamad		313–314						
Hadad-yith'i bilingual inscription	An inscription	1979	1		Tell Fekheriye	National Museum of Damascus	309						
Ketef Hinnom scrolls	An inscription	1979	2	650–587 BCE	Jerusalem	Israel Museum							
Sarepta Tanit Inscription	An inscription	1980s			Sarafand		285						
Çebel Ires Daǧı inscription	An inscription	1980	1		Çebel Ires Daǧı	Alanya Archaeological Museum	287						
Abdalonymos bilingual		1982	1	325 BCE	Kos		292						
Monumental Hebrew inscription from Jerusalem		1982	1	800–500 BCE	Byzantine Spolia near the Southern Wall	Israel Museum							
Hazael horse frontlet	An inscription	1984	1	800 BCE	Samos	Archaeological Museum of Vathi	311						
Bukan inscription		1985			Bukan		320						
İvriz stele		1986	1		Ereğli, Konya	Konya Ereğli Museum							
Bactria Aramaic documents	An inscription	1993–2002		353–324 BCE	Bactria	Khalili Collections							
Tel Dan Stele	An inscription	1993	1		Tel Dan	Israel Museum	310						
Tell Shiukh Fawqani inscription		1996					315						
Ekron Royal Dedicatory Inscription	An inscription	1996	1		Tel Miqne	Israel Museum	286						
Çineköy inscription	An inscription	1997	1		Çine, Yüreğir	Adana Archaeology Museum							
Tablet De Geest		2000	1	200s CE	Socotra	in situ							
Zayit Stone	An inscription	2005	1	c. 900 BCE	Tel Zayit								
Kuttamuwa stele	An inscription	2008	1		Sam'al	Gaziantep Archaeology Museum							
Khirbet Qeiyafa ostracon	An inscription	2009	1	c. 1000 BCE	Khirbet Qeiyafa	Israel Museum							
Ataruz altar inscriptions		2010		c. 800 BCE	Khirbat Ataruz								
Ishbaal Inscription	An inscription	2012		1020–980 BCE	Khirbet Qeiyafa								
KAI 283					Sidon		283						
KAI 284					Tyre		284						
Demetrias inscription					Demetrias		293						

== Bibliography ==
- Röllig, Wolfgang [in German] (1983). "The Phoenician Language: Remarks on the Present State of Research". Atti del I Congresso Internazionale di Studi Fenici e Punici. Vol. 2. Rome. pp. 375–385. doi:10.11588/propylaeumdok.00001074.
- Sass, Benjamin; Finkelstein, Israel (2013). "The West Semitic Alphabetic Inscriptions, Late Bronze II to Iron IIA: Archeological Context, Distribution and Chronology". Hebrew Bible and Ancient Israel. 2 (2): 149. doi:10.1628/219222713X13757034787838.
- Holm, Tawny L. (2026). Aramaic Literature from Egypt and the Levant. Writings from the Ancient World. Vol. 30. Atlanta: Society of Biblical Literature. ISBN 9781628377521.

== See also ==
- List of inscriptions in biblical archaeology
- Carthaginian tombstones
- Epigraphy
- Ancient Hebrew writings
- Hebrew and Aramaic papyri
