= Byblos marble inscription =

Phoenician inscription

Byblos marble inscription (KAI 280)

The Byblos marble inscription is a Phoenician inscription on a white marble fragment of a sarcophagus discovered around 1957 in the courtyard of Byblos Castle in the area where the east wall of the tower was located. It has been dated to 550-450 BCE, the period of the Achaemenid Empire; line 3 of the inscription is thought to refer to a Persian king. The inscription also refers to myrrh.

The fragment is broken on both the right and the left. It measures 56 cm x 43 cm with a thickness of 6.5-12 cm. Remnants of a total of 7 lines are preserved, which are neatly separated by dividing lines. The writing is carved in clear, regular letters, with occasional word separation.

It was first published in 1969 by Jean Starcky, and is held in the National Museum of Beirut (N 60.1). It is known as KAI 280, and "Byblos 13" as it is the thirteenth significant inscription discovered in Byblos.

The style of the inscription is similar to KAI 9, the Son of Shipitbaal inscription.

== Text of the inscription ==
The inscription reads:

(line 1a)	... B’]RN ’NK LḤDY	... in (this) to]mb I [lie] alone.
(1b)	WKN HN ’NK ŠKB B’RN ZN	And so, behold, I am lying in this tomb,
(1c)	’SP BMR WBBDL[Ḥ ...	(my bones) gathered and (treated) with myrrh and with bdelli[um ...
(2a)	... BL LPTḤ ‘]LT ’RN ZN	... do not open] this tomb,
(2b)	WLRGZ ‘ṢMY	or disturb my bones,
(2c)	H‘PYT BQŠN H’DR	(?) which are wrapped in a great shroud. (?) /
(or:)	H‘G YTBQŠN H’DR	/ (? alternative translation:) The Mighty Og (underworld god?) will take revenge on behalf of me. (?)
(2d)	WBKL DR[M ...	And in all clan[s] (?) / era[s (?) [...
(3a)	...MLK PRS(?)] W(?)MDY ’DN MLKM	... the King of Persia(?)] and Media(?), the Lord of Kings.
(3b)	WDRKM RḤQM YLKT BRBM [...	And I went on extremely distant voyages [...
(4)	...]Y’ MKST ’QN’ ’GN WYSP[T ...	...] a roof (?) with lapis lazuli did I cover, and I add[ed ...
(5)	...WYṢ’] HYWNYM(?) L’GD LM MLḤM[T ...	... and forth came] the Ionians (Greeks) to engage with them in battl[e ...
(6)	... MM]LKT L’BYTY ZR Ḥ[...	... king]ship (reign) of my fathers (?). Another [...
(7)	...]N ṢMD ḤD[...	... club?, wool? ...

== Bibliography ==
- Starcky Jean. Une inscription phénicienne de Byblos. In: Mélanges de l'Université Saint-Joseph, tome 45, 1969. Mélanges offerts à M. Maurice Dunand. Tome I. pp. 257–273. DOI : https://doi.org/10.3406/mefao.1969.1203
