= Tyre Cistern inscription =

Phoenician inscription found in Tyre, Lebanon

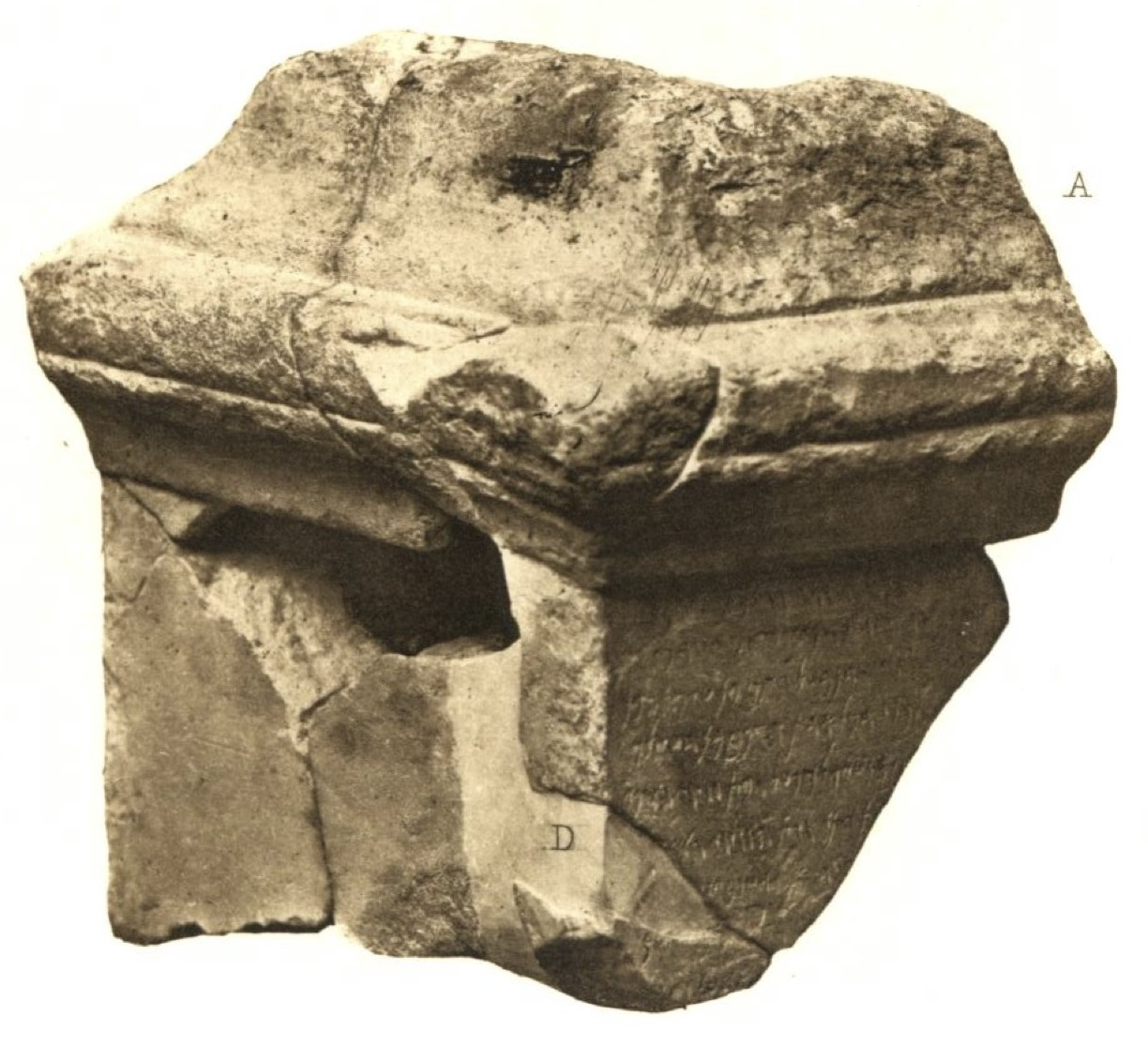
Tyre Cistern inscription (close up)

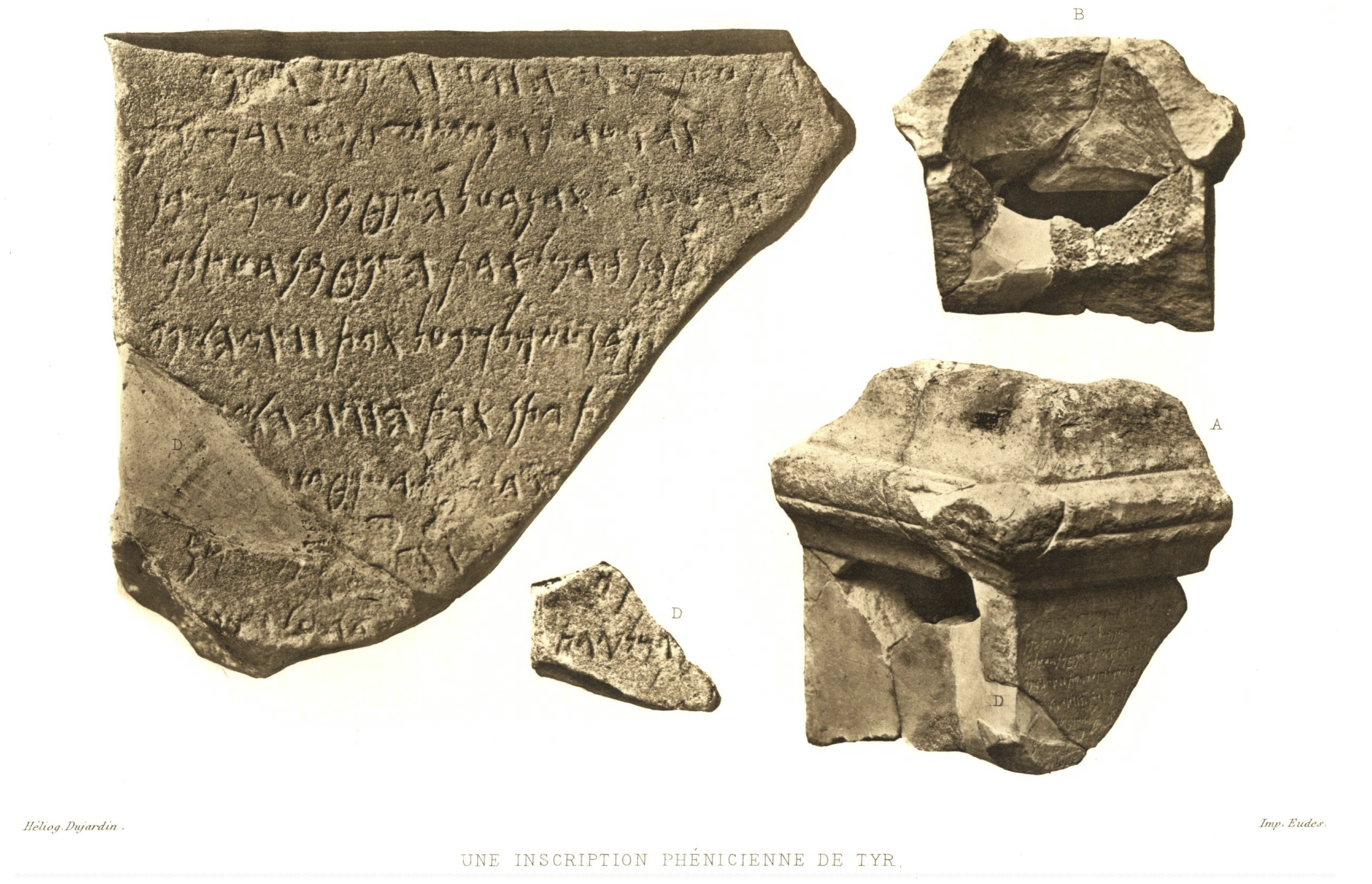
The cistern and inscription from various angles

The Tyre Cistern inscription is a Phoenician inscription on a white marble block discovered in the castle-palace of the Old City of Tyre, Lebanon in 1885 and acquired by Peter Julius Löytved, the Danish vice-consul in Beirut. It was the first Phoenician inscription discovered in modern times from Tyre.

One side of the parallelepiped-shaped cistern contains a Phoenician inscription which is broken and includes nine incomplete lines; it has been dated on paleographic grounds to the middle of the 3rd century BCE. The cistern (water outlet) likely part of a naos; according to the inscription it was donated by a man named Adonibaal.

It is currently kept in the Louvre (AO 1441).

== Bibliography ==
- Daccache, Jimmy & BRIQUEL CHATONNEt, Françoise & Hawley, Robert. (2014). Notes d’épigraphie et de philologie phéniciennes. 1. Semitica et Classica. 7. 10.1484/J.SEC.5.103526.
- Clermont-Ganneau. “UNE INSCRIPTION PHÉNICIENNE DE TYR.” Revue Archéologique 7 (1886): 1–9. http://www.jstor.org/stable/41725388.
