= Tharros Punic inscriptions =

Group of Punic inscriptions in Sardinia, Italy

The Tharros Punic inscriptions are a group of Punic inscriptions found at the archeological site of Tharros in Sardinia.

In the nineteenth century, a few funerary inscriptions engraved on cippi were discovered (CIS I 154-161). In 1901 an important 3rd century BC inscription dedicated to Melqart was found, but the surface was very damaged, currently the longest Punic inscription outside of North Africa.

Many short texts are engraved on small objects: a hemisphere in dolomitic stone, an amulet, and two silver plates.

Neopunic graffiti on ceramic fragments has also been found.

== Concordande ==
			Concordance		
Image	Current location	Discovered	ICO Sard	CIS	Other
	lost	1850	6	160	
	Museo Archeologico Nazionale di Cagliari	1852	5	153	
	Museo Archeologico Nazionale di Cagliari	1855	7	159	
	lost	1855	8		
	lost	1861	10		
	Como, Museo archeologico Paolo Giovio	1863	12	154	KI 61
	Museo Archeologico Nazionale di Cagliari	1863	13	156	
	Museo Archeologico Nazionale di Cagliari	1863	14	155	
	Museo Archeologico Nazionale di Cagliari	1865	16	157	
	Sassari, Museo nazionale archeologico ed etnografico G. A. Sanna	1870	24	158	KI 62, KAI 67
	Museo Archeologico Nazionale di Cagliari	1873	15	RES 1591	
	lost	1875	21	161	
	Museo Archeologico Nazionale di Cagliari	1900	31	RES 21	
	Museo Archeologico Nazionale di Cagliari	1901	32		

== Bibliography ==
- Amadasi Guzzo, Maria Giulia (1990). Iscrizioni fenicie e puniche in Italia (PDF). Libreria dello Stato, Istituto poligrafico e Zecca dello Stato. ISBN 978-88-240-0109-0.
- ICO: Amadasi Guzzo, Maria Giulia (1967). Le iscrizioni fenicie e puniche delle colonie in Occidente. Studi semitici (in Italian). Istituto di studi del Vicino Oriente, Università.
- CIS: Corpus Inscriptionum Semiticarum; the first section is focused on Phoenician-Punic inscriptions (176 "Phoenician" inscriptions and 5982 "Punic" inscriptions)
