= Mitsri genealogy inscription =

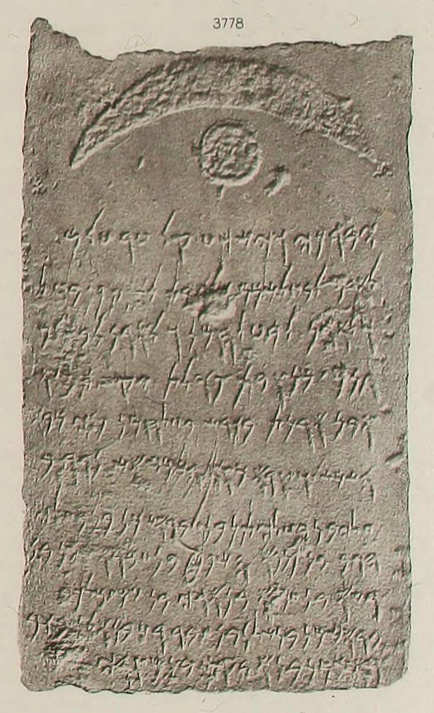
- Material: Stone
- Created: 4th century BCE
- Discovered: c. 1924; Tunis, Tunisia
- Language: Punic

The Mitsri genealogy inscription, known as KAI 78 or CIS I 3778, is a votive stele from Carthage in the Punic language.

It was excavated between 1922-25 by French archaeologist François Icard (Icard no. C!439_{2}*) and published by Eusèbe Vassel. Francis Kelsey took a squeeze of the stele during his 1925 archaeological mission.

The inscription was originally attached to a statue of Baal-Hammon, and is dated to the fourth century BCE. It is remarkable because it traces back the lineage of a certain Baalay, who put up the statue, for no less than sixteen generations, spanning a period of at least four centuries.

The name of the earliest ancestor, Mitsrî, means "(the) Egyptian". Two of Baalay's forefathers, three and four generations before him, had high functions in Carthage as a General (rab) and a head of state (suffes), respectively.

== Text of the inscription ==
The inscription reads:

(line 1)	YBRKY WYŠM‘ QL ‘D ‘LM	May they (the gods) bless him (Baalay) and may they hear [his] voice (prayers) in perpetuity!
(2)	L’DN LB‘L ŠMM WLRBT LTNT PN B‘L	[This stele is dedicated] to the Lord Baalsamem and to the Lady Tinnît-Phanebal
(3)	WL’DN LB‘L ḤMN WL’DN LB‘L M	and to the Lord Baal-Hammon and to the Lord Baal of the Ma-
(4)	GNM MNṢBT PSLT [Š]QD -T[..]’	-gonids; [this] stele, sculpted, (...)
(5)	’BN ’RKT BKDŠ B‘L ḤMN PNY MB’	of stone, tall, bearing the figure of Baal-Hammon, his face to
(6)	HŠMŠ WṢD’ MṢ’ HŠMŠ ’Š NDR B	the West (lit.: the Entrance of the Sun) and his back to the East (lit.: the Exit of the Sun), that has vowed B-
(7)	‘LY BN B‘LYTN	-aalay, the son of Baalyaton,	17th and 16th generations
	BN ‘BD’ŠMN	the son of 'Abd-Eshmun,	15th —
	BN B‘LY	the son of Baalay	14th —
(8)	HRB BN PNP’ HŠPṬ	the General, the son of PNP’ the suffes,	13th —
	BN ‘BD’[ŠM]N BN	the son of 'Abd-E[shmu]n, the son of	12th —
(9)	RŠ’ BN ‘M’	RŠ’, the son of Ammî,	11th and 10th —
	BN ’DY	the son of 'Iddo,	9th —
	BN ŠM‘MLK B<N>	the son of Samo-Milk, the so[n of]	8th —
(10)	BD’ŠMN BN ŠLN	Bodeshmun, the son of ŠLN,	7th and 6th —
	BN ‘BDR‘	the son of 'Abd-Ra,	5th —
	BN ’TN BN B	the son of Êtan, the son of Bo-	4th —
(11)	D’ŠMN BN ’BQM	-deshmun, the son of Abî-Qom,	3rd and 2nd —
	BN MṢRY	the son of Mitsrî.	1st generation

Above the text a "Crescent and Disc" symbol is depicted, a common symbol on Carthaginian grave stelae. Probably portraying the new and full moon, the symbol seems to refer to the passage of time, but the precise meaning is unknown.
