= Byblos altar inscription =

Phoenician inscription found in Byblos

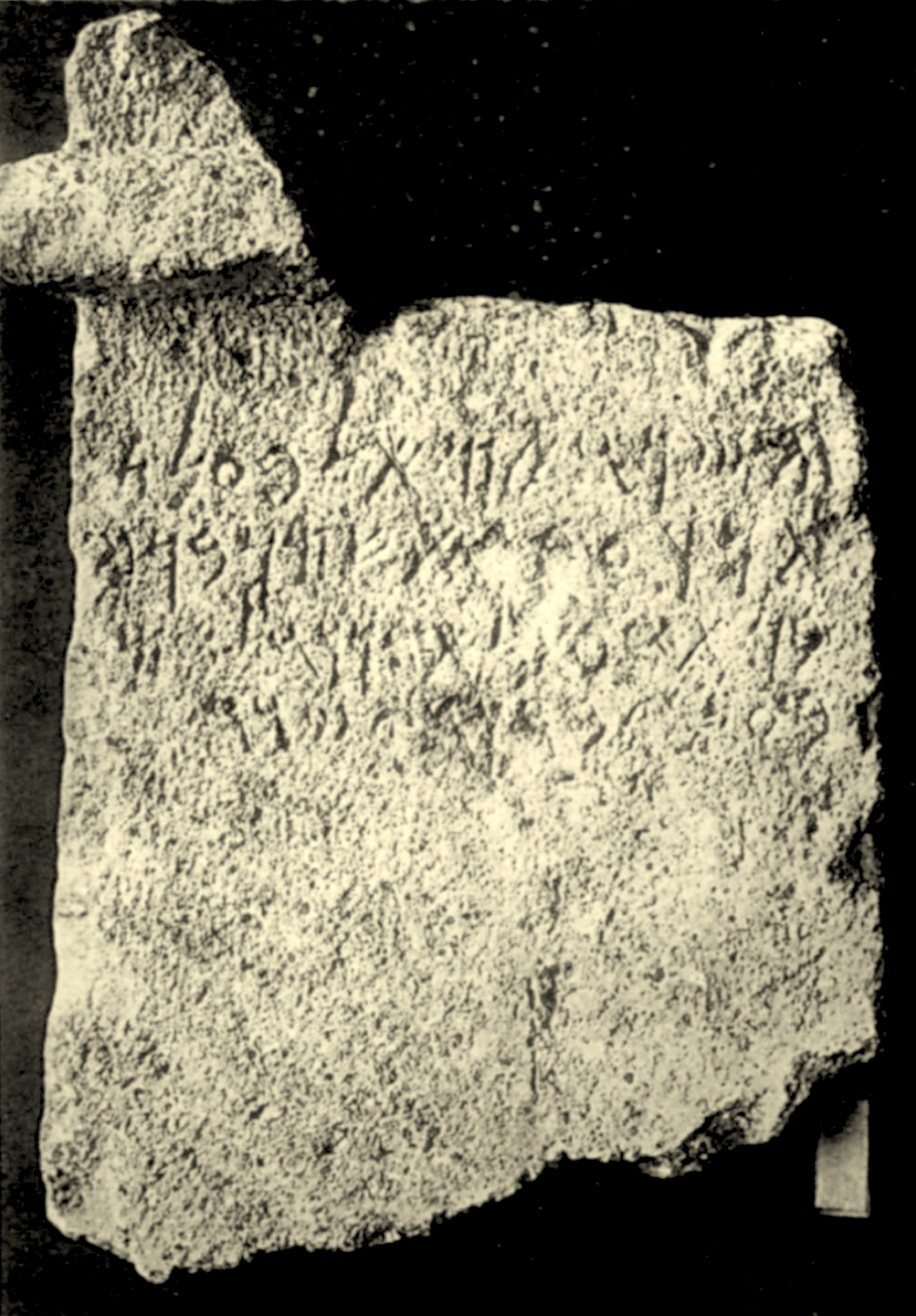
The Byblos altar inscription, found in 1923 by Pierre Montet

The Byblos altar inscription is a Phoenician inscription on a broken altar discovered around 1923 during the excavations of Pierre Montet in the area of the Byblos temples. It was discovered outside the temples and tombs, a few meters from the hypocausts, in a modern wall.

A four-line Phoenician inscription is engraved on one side. The inscription has been translated as follows:

𐤄𐤇𐤍𐤅𐤈𐤌 𐤀𐤋 𐤐𐤏𐤋𐤕	hḥnṭm ʾl pʿlt	These ḥnṭm made
𐤀𐤍𐤊 𐤏𐤁𐤃𐤀𐤔𐤌𐤍 𐤁𐤍𐤄	ʾnk ʿbdʾšmn bnh	I, Abdeshmun the builder
𐤁𐤍 𐤀𐤎𐤏𐤀 𐤋𐤀𐤃𐤍𐤍 𐤅𐤋𐤎𐤌𐤋	bn ʾsʿʾ lʾdnn wlsml	son of ʾsʿʾ, for our lord and for the statue
𐤁𐤏𐤋 𐤉𐤁𐤓𐤊 𐤅𐤉𐤇𐤅𐤅	bʿl ybrk wyḥww	of Baʿal, May he bless [him] and bring him to life.

The form of a number of the letters, particularly the he and the let was different from any that had been found the Lebanon previously, closer to neopunic, so it was originally dated to the Roman era. It was later redated to 200-100 BCE by Brian Peckham. As such it is considered to be of great importance as a "limiting case" of Phoenician inscriptions from Byblos.

The altar is 36cm in height, and has the inscription on only one of its faces.

It was first published in 1924-25 by René Dussaud, and is held in the National Museum of Beirut.

It is known as KAI 12, and is one of thirteen significant inscriptions discovered in Byblos.

== Bibliography ==
- Montet, Pierre, BAH 11 - Byblos et l'Egypte Quatre Campagnes de Fouilles à Gebeil 1921-1922-1923-1924(1928), p.258, item: 1020
