= Honeyman inscription =

Phoenician gravestone inscription

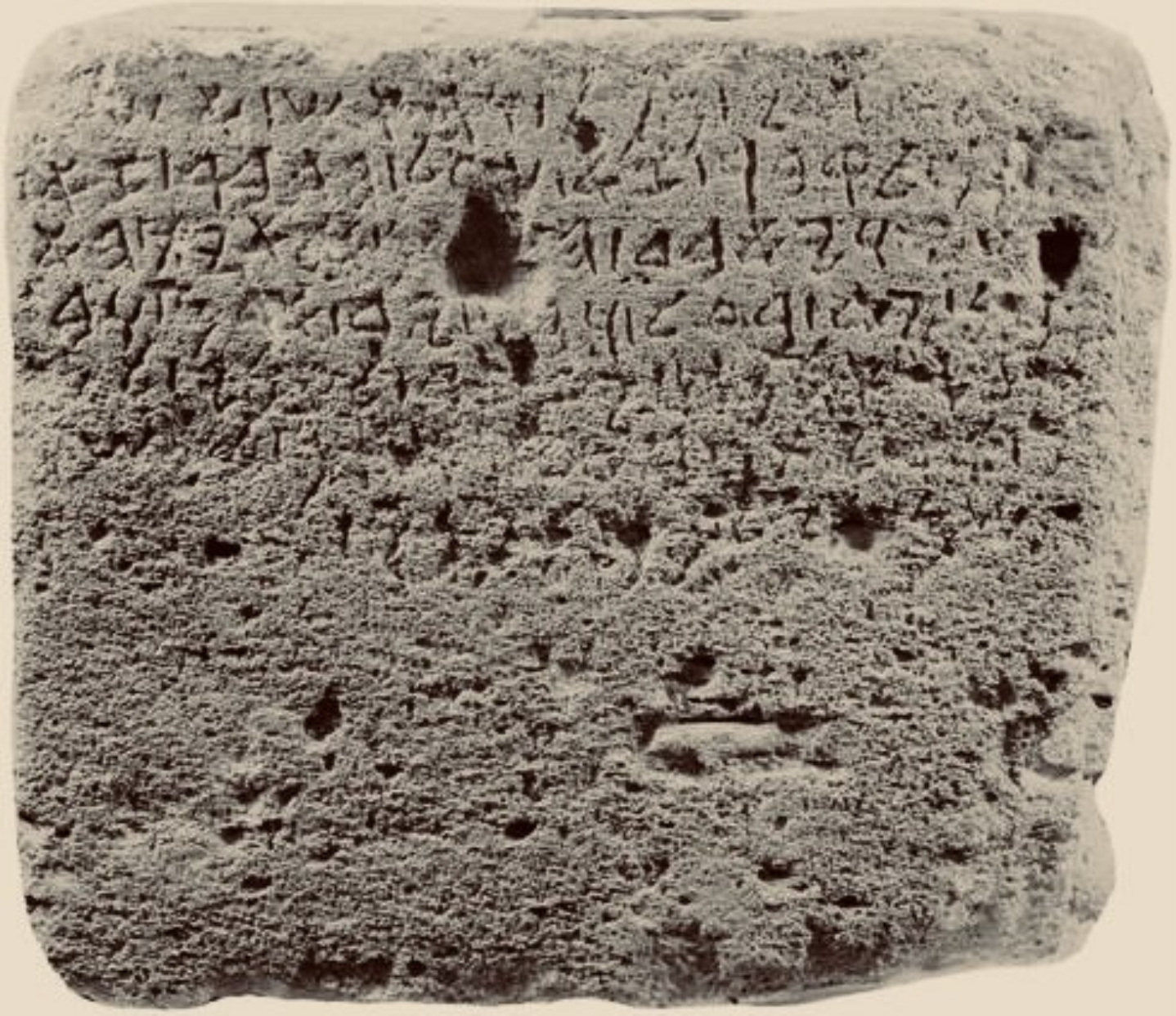
- Created: c. 900 BC
- Discovered: before 1940; Cyprus
- Present location: Nicosia, Nicosia District, Cyprus

The Honeyman inscription, also known as the Archaic Cyprus inscription, is a seven-line Phoenician gravestone inscription found in Cyprus and first published in 1939. It is the oldest detailed Phoenician inscription found in Cyprus.

It was first published in 1939 by Professor Alexander Mackie Honeyman in a review of the Phoenician inscriptions in the Cyprus Museum. Its provenance is unknown, but it is made from red sandstone typical of Kokkinochoria. On the basis of letter forms and grammatical peculiarities the writing was dated to c. 900 BCE (or rather the first half of the ninth century) by William F. Albright.

It is currently in the Cyprus Museum (no. 397).

It is also known as KAI 30.

== Text of the inscription ==
The inscription apparently refers to the tomb of an important individual. Unlike other tombs it does not begin with the name of the deceased or the name of the builder of the monument. Most of the first four lines is readable, and it is helpful that word borders are nicely indicated by vertical strokes as word separators. But even then the interpretation is not easy.

The Phoenician text reads (uncertain letters are underlined, a colon is the word separator):

(line 1)	...]H’ : ’Y : MPT : WH’Š : ’Š[.
(2)	...]M : LQBR : Z’ : K‘L : HGBR : Z’[
(3)	...]ŠY : WY’BD : H[...] Z’ : ’YT : H’[
(4)	.] BN : YD : B‘L : WBN : YD : ’DM : WB[N
(5)	YD ..]’R : ’LM : [.....] : L..Y : L[.
(6)	..]..’YT : [...............]Š[..
(7)	..].ŠM[...]Y[..........]NY

Honeyman reconstructed and translated the first five lines as:

(line 1)	H’ ’Y MPT WR’Š ’Š[	This is no magistrate or ruler
(2)	Š]M LQBR Z’ Š‘L HGBR Z’	[pla]ced in this tomb which is over this man.
(3)	NŠY WY’BD H[MṬ]M’ ’YT H’[RN	He who [de]files (this) sar[cophagus will be for]gotten and will perish
(4)	Z’] BN YD B‘L WBN YD ’DM WB[N	whether by the hand of Ba‘al or by the hand of man or b[y
(5)	YD Ḥ]BR ’LM [..............]‘NY L[	the hand of the as]sembly of the gods [...]

The inscription being one of the oldest in Cyprus in the Phoenician language, Krahmalkov has interpreted it as referring to a Phoenician who, perhaps as a colonizer, invaded the island. Crucial for his interpretation is the reading of two words. In line 1 the otherwise unknown word MPT, read by Honeyman as something like mufti and interpreted as a synonym of R’Š (rō’š = head), is read by Krahmalkov as mipPūt, from Pūt, out of Pūt, where Pūt is assumed to be the name Phoenicia. And in line 3 the incomplete word ..]ŠY is read by Krahmalkov as ’LŠY, Alasiya, the common name of Cyprus. His reconstruction and translation of the first four lines is:

(line 1)	[’ŠM] B’ ’Y MPT WH’Š ’Š [R’Š-]	[Men] came to (this) island from Pūt, and the man who was [their lead-
(2)	-M LQBR Z’ Y‘L HGBR Z’	-er,] his is this grave. This warrior came up to (invaded)
(3)	[’L]ŠY WY’BD H[...] Z’ ’YT H’[Y]	[Ala]siya, and[...] this (man/warrior) devastated the isl[and].
(4)	BN YD B‘L WBN YD ’DM WB[N...]	In him was the strength of Baal, and in him was the strength of man/’Adom, and in h[im...]
