= Kition inscribed bowl =

Inscribed bowl discovered at Kition, Cyprus

The Kition inscribed bowl is a fragmentary slipware bowl with a Phoenician inscription discovered in Cyprus at Kition (modern Larnaca) in 1969. It has been described as “the earliest written evidence” found at Kition.

It was found during the excavations of Vassos Karageorghis in its archeological context on the floor of the earliest phase of a Phoenician temple that was destroyed by fire around 800 BC.

The inscription’s interpretation is disputed; it has been interpreted either as a record of a hair offering to Astarte and as a series of incantations.

It is held at the Cyprus Museum, with ID number Kit. 1435.

== Discovery ==
The bowl was discovered in 1969, during the second year of Karageorghis's excavations at Kition. Its fragments were recovered from the floor of the first period of the Phoenician temple.

== Description ==
The shallow red-slipware bowl was approximately 24.5 cm in diameter at the rim, 8.5 cm in diameter at the base, and 5 cm high. The 12-13 joined fragments preserve about one-quarter to one-third of the bowl.

A six line inscription is engraved on the outer surface, with no writing on the inside. Dupont-Sommer suggested that the inscription may have originally occupied only one half of the exterior, with the uninscribed half possibly facing a wall, whereas Coote suggested that the six lines originally continued around the entire outer surface, with gaps between sections of text.

The inscription has been dated to approximately 850–800 BC on the basis of its letter forms and its location in the earliest phase of the temple.. Some letters appeared archaic, others appear to resemble later forms, suggesting that the script could be as late as the early seventh century BCE.

== Publication and interpretation ==
In 1970 André Dupont-Sommer published the editio princeps following Karageorghis's report to the Académie des Inscriptions et Belles-Lettres on 14 November 1969. He interpreted the inscription as commemorating offerings made to Astarte by a person named ml, including the shaving and dedication of his hair, and suggested references to animal sacrifices and to a vow associated with Tamassos.

In 1972, Teixidor identified two recurring groups of letters, one occurring four times and the other three times. He noted that the surviving letters trt in the first line could belong either to the name of Astarte or to a personal name incorporating that of the goddess.

In 1975, Robert B. Coote proposed that the text could be understood as a Phoenician incantation bowl addressed to an unnamed protective deity against a demon described as a “dog”. He proposed the following translation:

1. ].. Incantation. Poke the dog so that it slumps [before As]tarte, and p[oke(?) ..
2. When it comes, poke it and let it come (again). Incantation. And the [dog(?) is slum]ped ..
3. Poke the decrepit one! Incantation. Recite ...

== Bibliography ==
- Dupont-Sommer, André (1972). "Une inscription phénicienne archaïque récemment trouvée à Kition (Chypre)". Mémoires de l'Institut national de France (in French). 44 (2): 273–294. doi:10.3406/minf.1972.1021.
- Teixidor, Javier (1972). "Bulletin d'épigraphie sémitique 1972". Syria (in French). 49 (3–4): 413–449.
- Coote, Robert B. (1975). "The Kition Bowl". Bulletin of the American Schools of Oriental Research (220): 47–50. doi:10.2307/1356234. JSTOR 1356234.
