= Batnoam sarcophagus =

Sarcophagus of a Phoenician royal

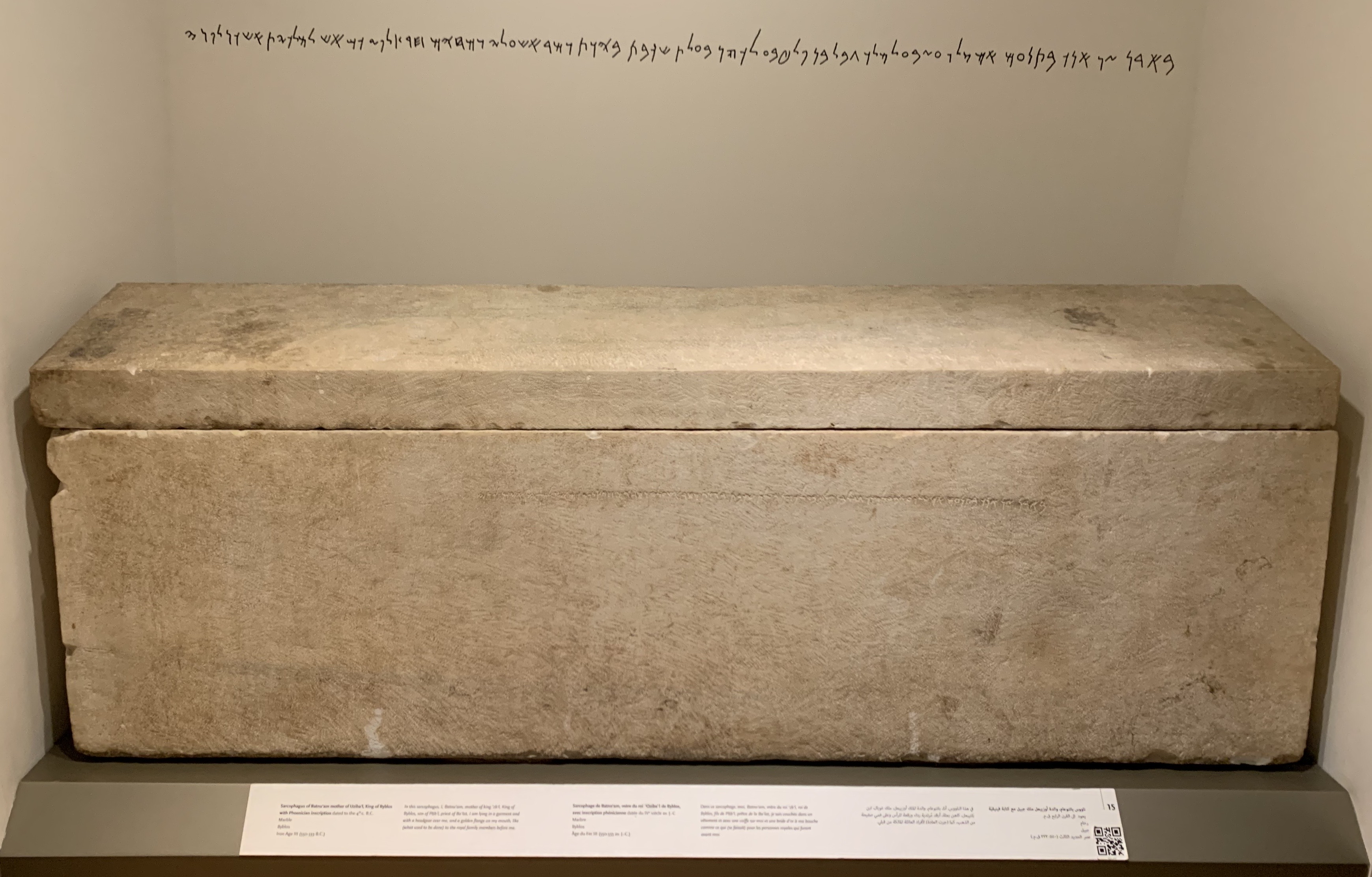
Batnoam inscription

The Batnoam inscription is a Phoenician inscription (KAI 11 and TSSI III 26) on a sarcophagus. It is dated to c. 450-425 BCE.

It was published in Maurice Dunand's Fouilles de Byblos (volume I, 1926-1932, numbers 1142, plate XXVIII).

== Text of the inscription ==
The inscription reads:

B’RN ZN ’NK BTN‘M	In this coffin I, Batno‘am,
’M MLK ‘ZB‘L MLK GBL	mother of King Azbaal, King of Byblos,
BN PLṬB‘L KHN B‘LT	son of Pilletbaal, Priest of Baalat
ŠKBT	lie,
BSWT WMR’Š ‘LY	wearing a garment and a head-piece on me,
WMḤSM ḤRṢ LPY	and a muzzle of gold on my mouth
KM ’Š LMLKYT ’Š KN LPNY	like those of the queens who were before me.

== Bibliography ==
- Christopher Rollston, "The Dating of the Early Royal Byblian Phoenician Inscriptions: A Response to Benjamin Sass." MAARAV 15 (2008): 57–93.
- Benjamin Mazar, The Phoenician Inscriptions from Byblos and the Evolution of the Phoenician-Hebrew Alphabet, in The Early Biblical Period: Historical Studies (S. Ahituv and B. A. Levine, eds., Jerusalem: IES, 1986 [original publication: 1946]): 231–247.
- William F. Albright, The Phoenician Inscriptions of the Tenth Century B.C. from Byblus, JAOS 67 (1947): 153–154.
