= Avignon Punic inscription =

Language inscription found in the Champfleury area of Avignon in 1892

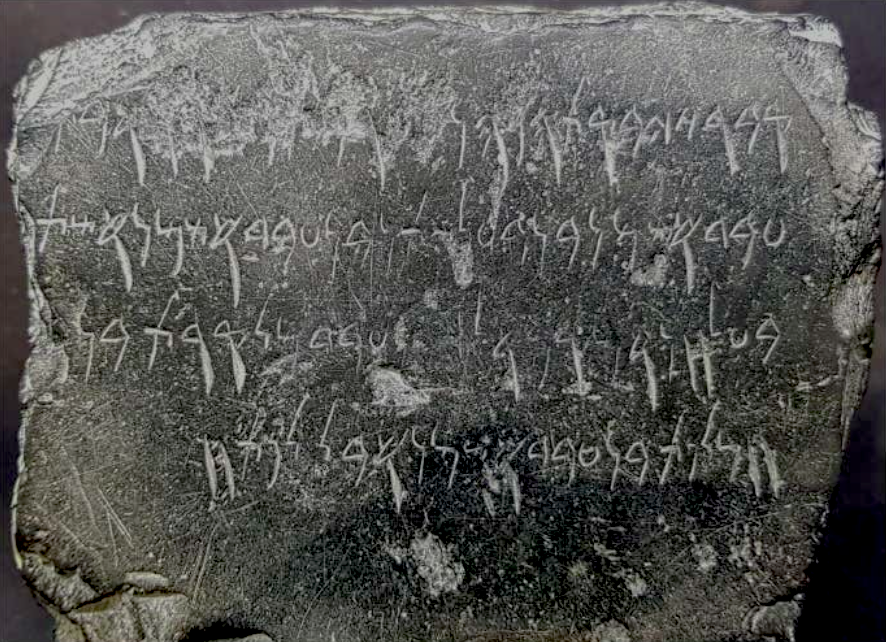
The Avignon Punic inscription

The Avignon Punic inscription is a Punic language inscription found in the Champfleury area of Quartier Ouest of Avignon in 1897, by a builder digging a trench 2-3 meters deep on the boundary of a property. It was first announced by Mayer Lambert.

It is currently held at the Musée d'archéologie méditerranéenne in Marseille. It is known as KAI 70 and RES 360

It is considered to originate from Carthage.

== Inscription ==
(1)	QBR ZYBQT HKHN[T L]RBT ... BT	(This is the) grave of ZYBQT, the pries[tess of (the)] Lady... daughter of
(2)	ʿBDʾŠMN BN BʿLYTN BN ʿBDʾŠMN ʾŠT	'Abd-Eshmun, son of Baalyaton, son of 'Abd-Eshmun; wife of
(3)	BʿLḤNʾ MQM ʾL[M BN] ʿBDMLQRT BN	Baalhanno, (the) servant (of the) go[ds, son of] 'Abd-Melqart, son of
(4)	ḤMLKT BN ʿBDʾŠMN ʾBL LPTḤ	Himilco, son of 'Abd-Eshmun. Do not open this.

== Gallery ==
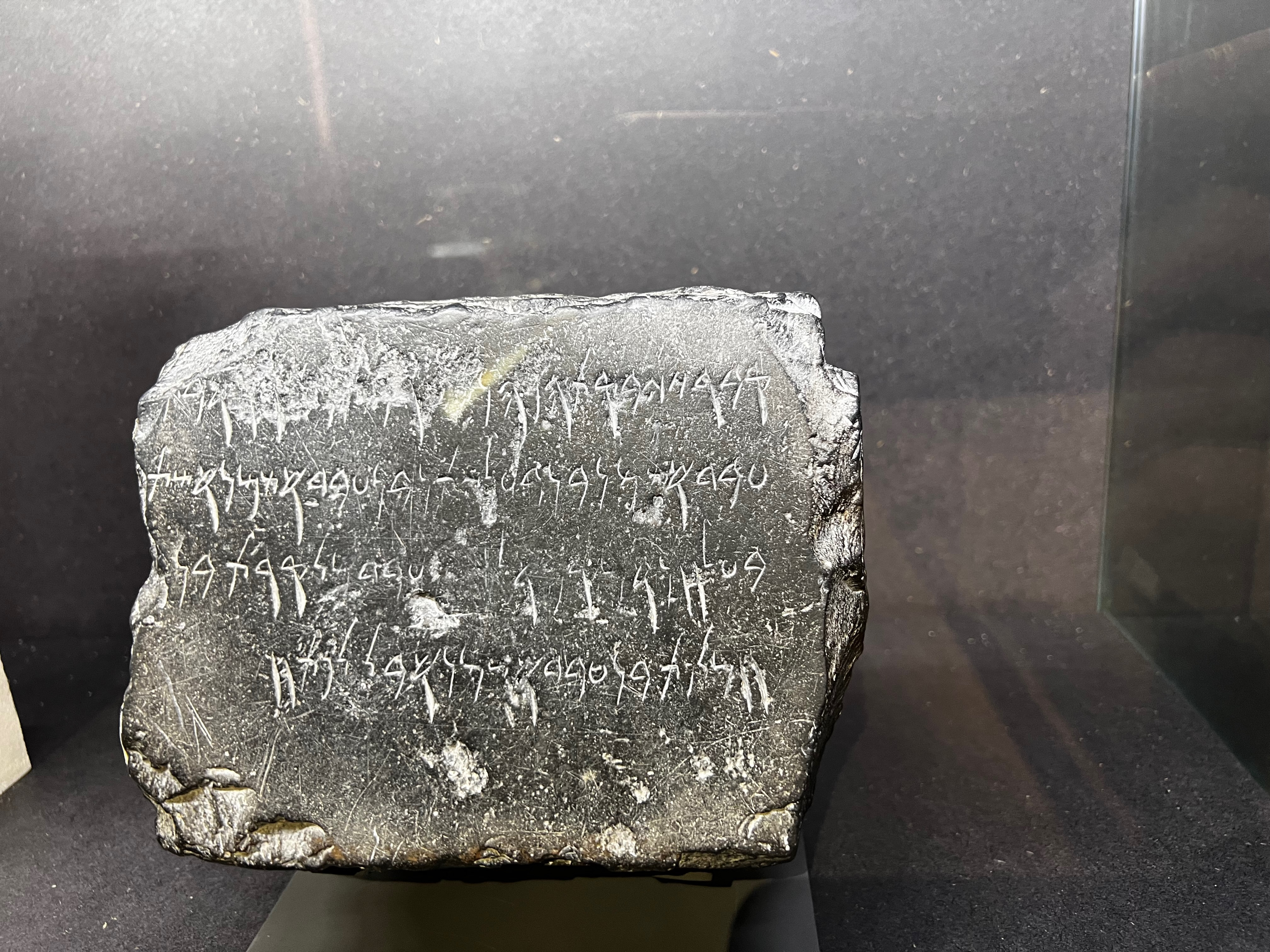

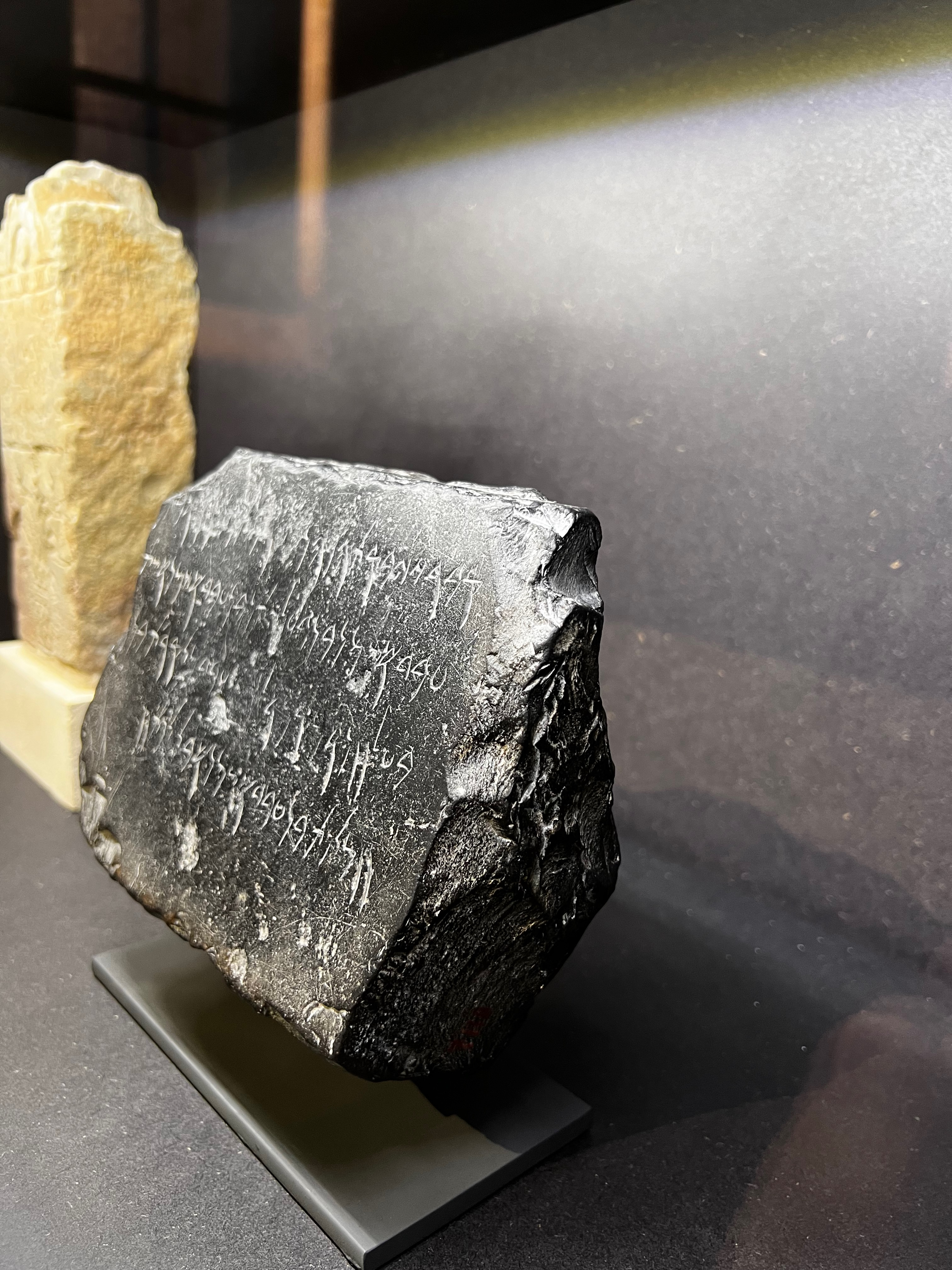

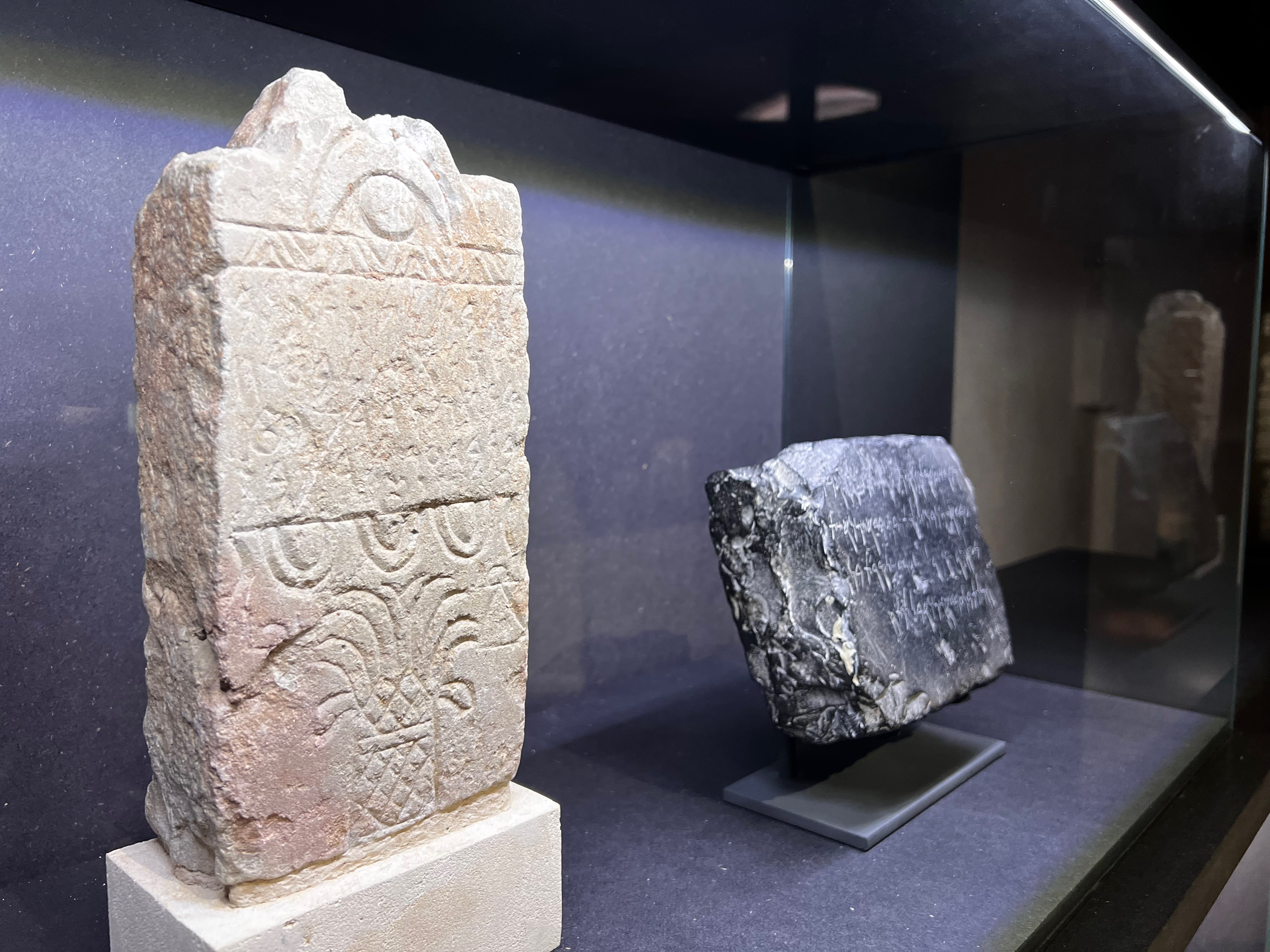

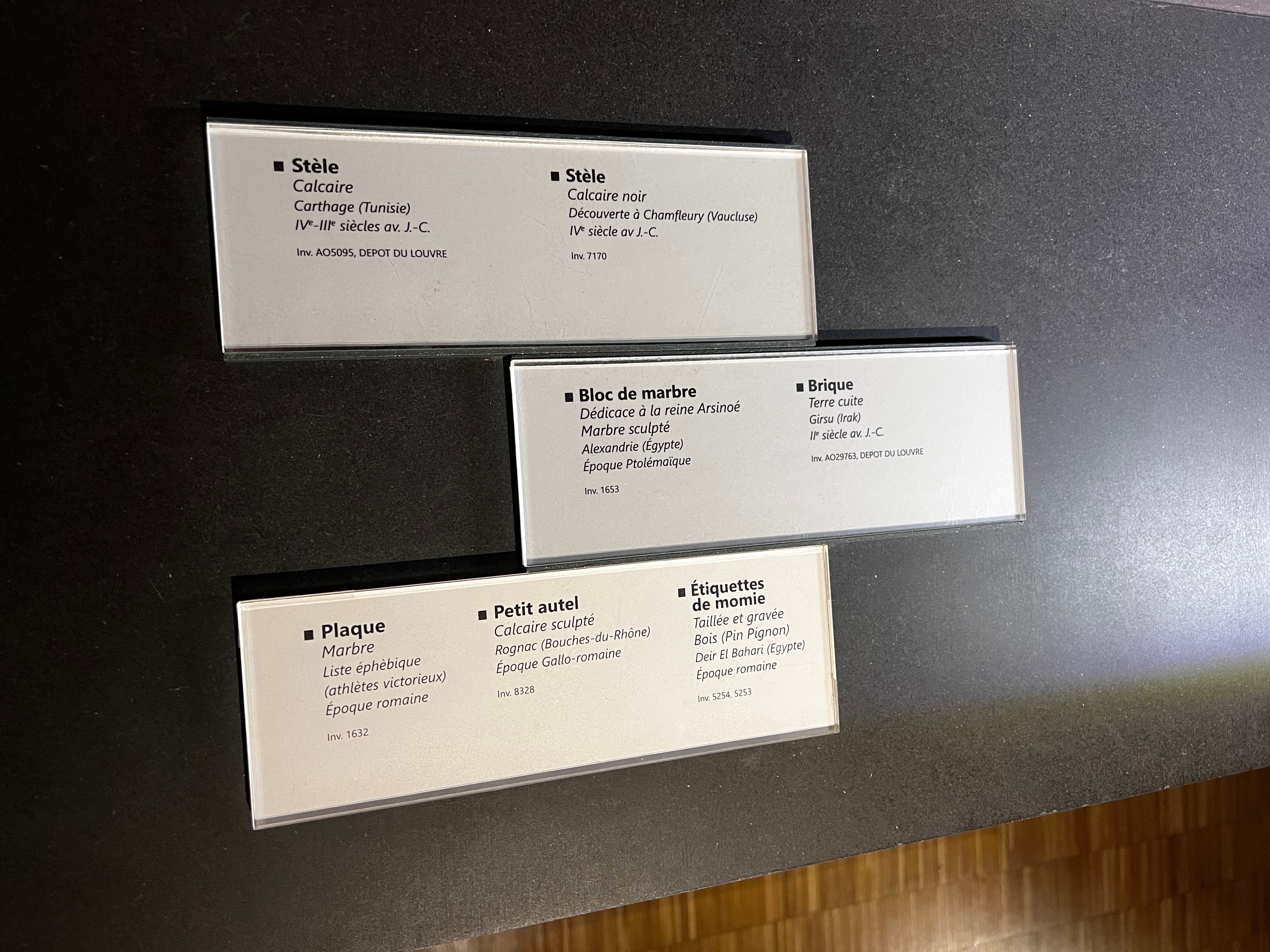

== Bibliography ==
- Berger Philippe. Annonce de la découverte d'une inscription phénicienne à Avignon. In: Comptes rendus des séances de l'Académie des Inscriptions et Belles-Lettres, 41^{e} année, N. 6, 1897. p. 672. DOI : https://doi.org/10.3406/crai.1897.71073
- Berger, Philippe (1898). "ÉTUDE SUR LA PROVENANCE DE L'INSCRIPTION PHÉNICIENNE D'AVIGNON". Revue d'Assyriologie et d'archéologie orientale. 5 (1). Presses Universitaires de France: 1–10. ISSN 0373-6032. JSTOR 23275699.
- Clerc Michel. Note sur l'inscription phénicienne d'Avignon. In: Comptes rendus des séances de l'Académie des Inscriptions et Belles-Lettres, 42^{e} année, N. 3, 1898. pp. 446-452. DOI : https://doi.org/10.3406/crai.1898.71205
