= Gözne Boundary Stone =

Inscribed stone found in southern Turkey

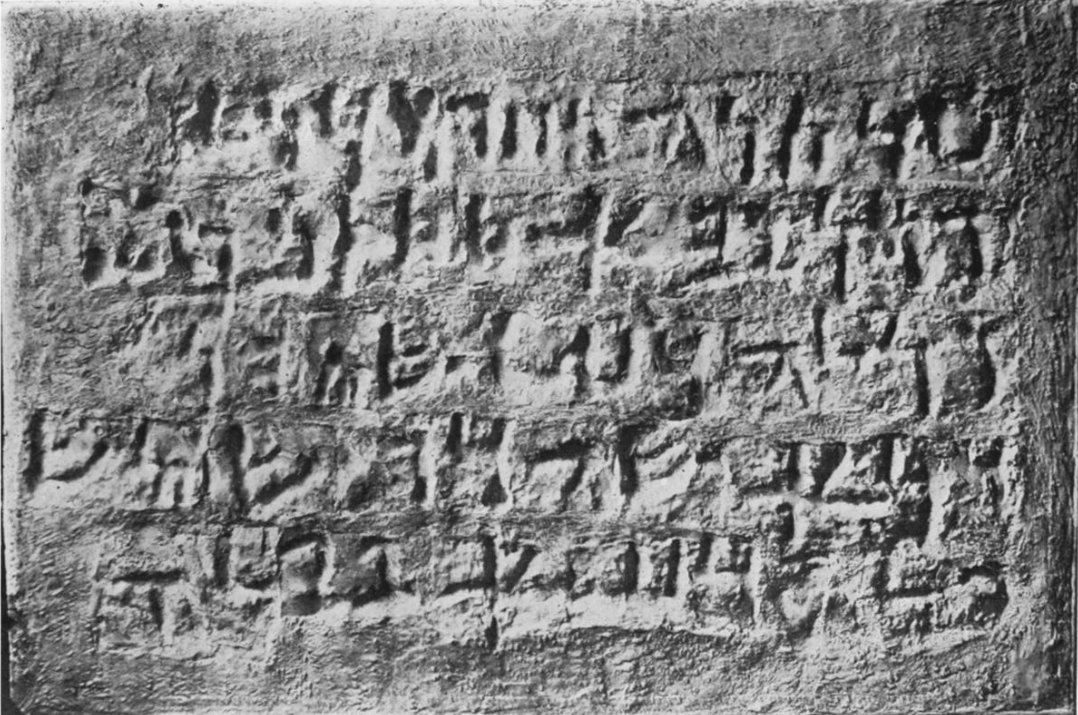
Inscription copy from 1907

The Gözne Boundary Stone is an Aramaic inscription found in situ in 1907 near the village of Gözne in Southern Anatolia, by John Renwick Metheny. It was first published by James Alan Montgomery.

== Translations ==
James Alan Montgomery transliterated and translated the inscription as follows:

עד תנה תחום רנל
ומן זי את תצבו
פנלה בעל שמין
רבא שהר ושמש
ולזרעא זי לה

ʿd tnh tḥwm rnl
wmn zy ʾt tṣbw
pnlh bʿl šmyn
rbʾ šhr wšmš
wlzrʿʾ zy lh

Up to here the boundary of RNL
And whoever thou art who wilt [destroy, over-
whelm] him Be'el-Samen
the great, Moon and Sun,
and his seed

== Gallery ==
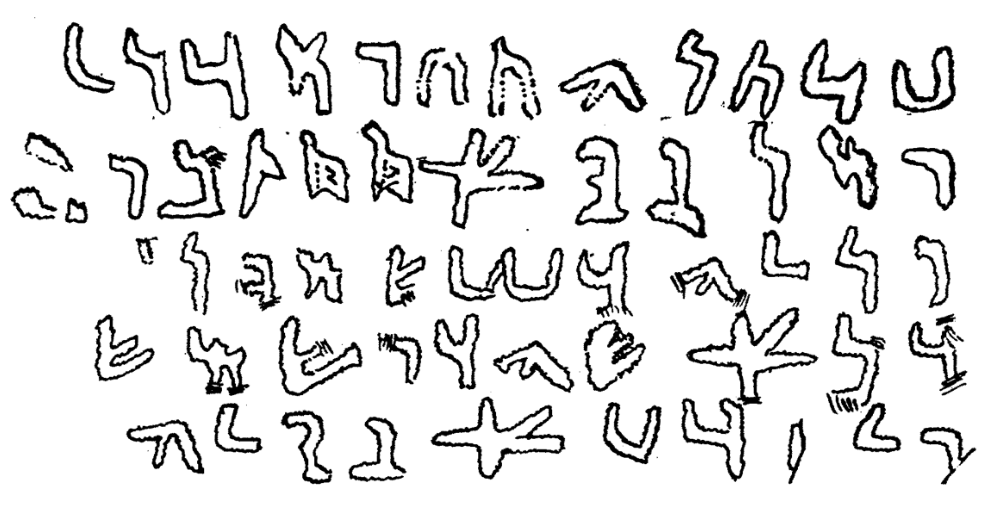
Sketch of inscription

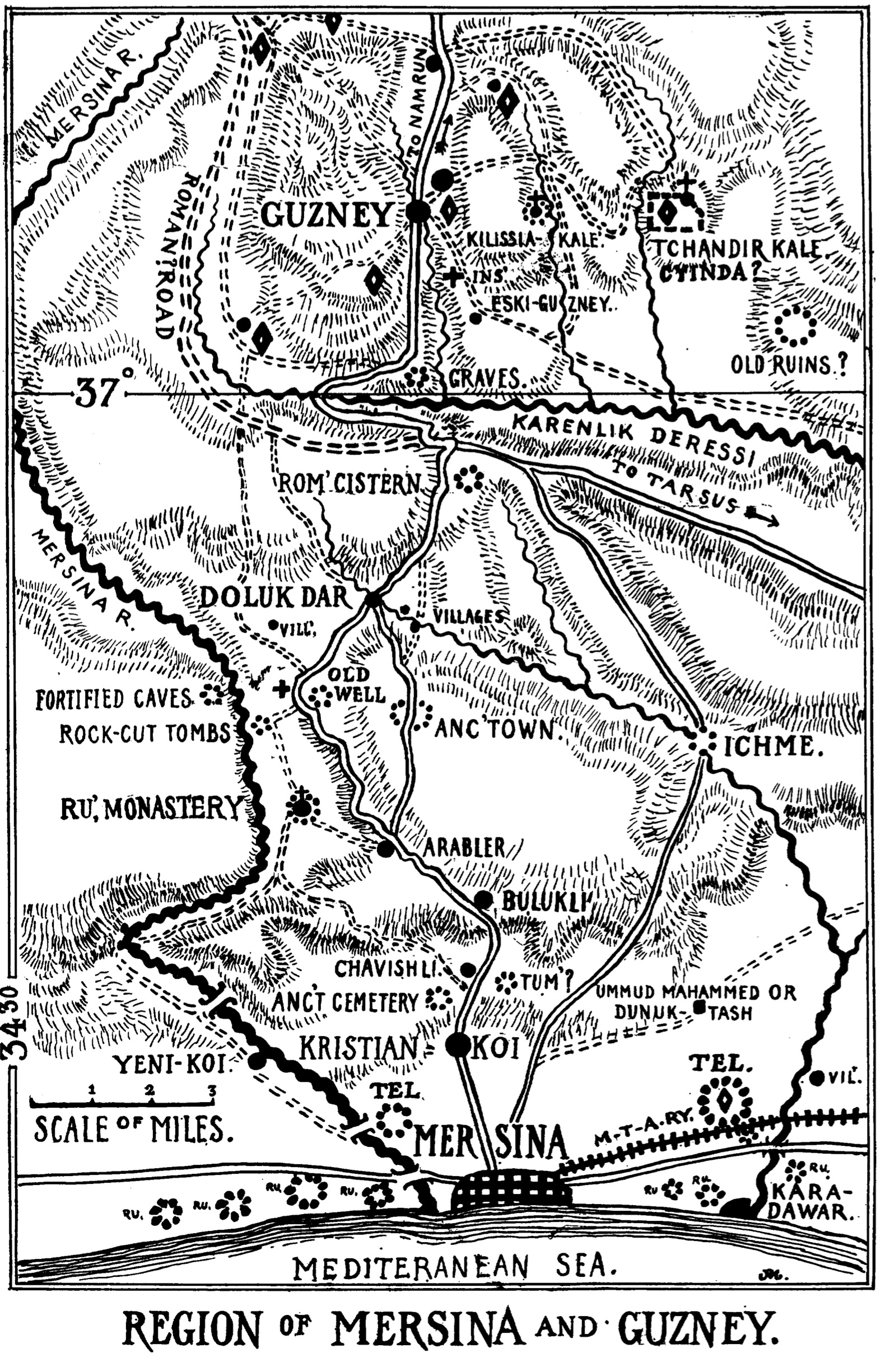
Metheny's map of the region, showing the area of the inscription.

== Bibliography ==
- Metheny, J.R., "Road Notes from Cilicia and North Syria." JAOS 28 (1907): 155–63
- Montgomery, James A., "Report on an Aramaic Boundary Inscription in Cilicia." JAOS 28 (1907): 164–67 + 1 pl.
- Halévy, J., "Une inscription bornaire araméenne de Cilicie." RevSém 16 (1908b): 434–37
- Hanson, R.S., "Aramaic Funerary and Boundary Inscriptions from Asia Minor." BASOR 192 (1968): 3–11. Kesecek Daskyleion LimBil GozBdSt
