= Arwad bilingual =

Phoenician-Greek inscription found in Syria

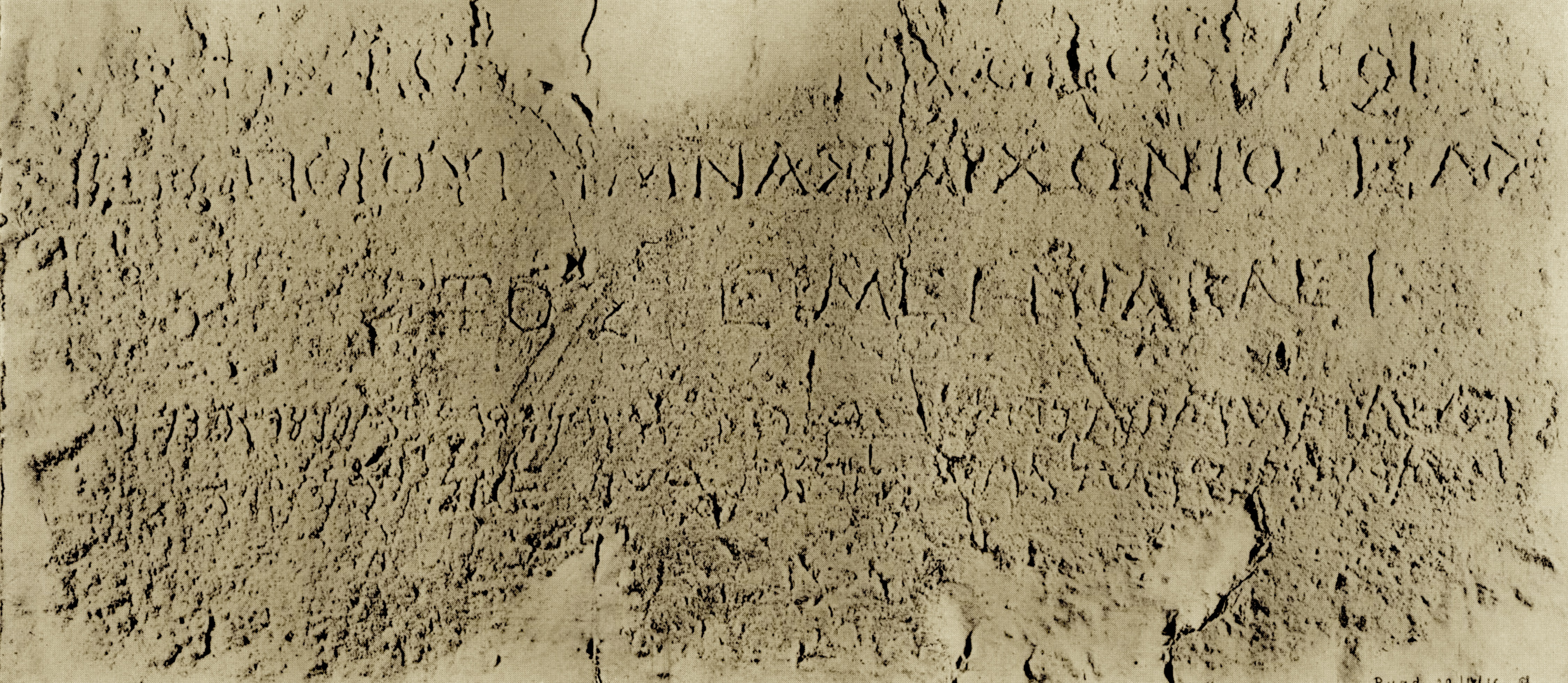
Arwad bilingual Phoenician Greek inscription

The Arwad bilingual, also the Arados inscription, is a Phoenician-Greek inscription from Arwad, Syria.

It is the most recent dated inscription in the corpus of Phoenician inscriptions from the Phoenician homeland, and is the oldest inscription found on the island of Arwad. It is considered to be important evidence for the last times (Terminus post quem) when the Phoenician language was used in Phoenicia. The inscription is in the Louvre under item code AO 7676.

It is engraved on a limestone statue base measuring 23 x 42 x 50 cm, with a 9 cm deep embedding hole. It was first published in 1916 by from the collection of French military governor, governor of the island of Rouad following the landing of the French troops on the 1 September 1915 during World War I. The provenance is unknown; Trabaud had bought the object from an inhabitant of the island who had held it for "some time". It entered the Louvre in 1921, although this was not reported at the time, so its location was long unknown and Savignac's publication was not widely reviewed by epigraphers.

== Gallery ==
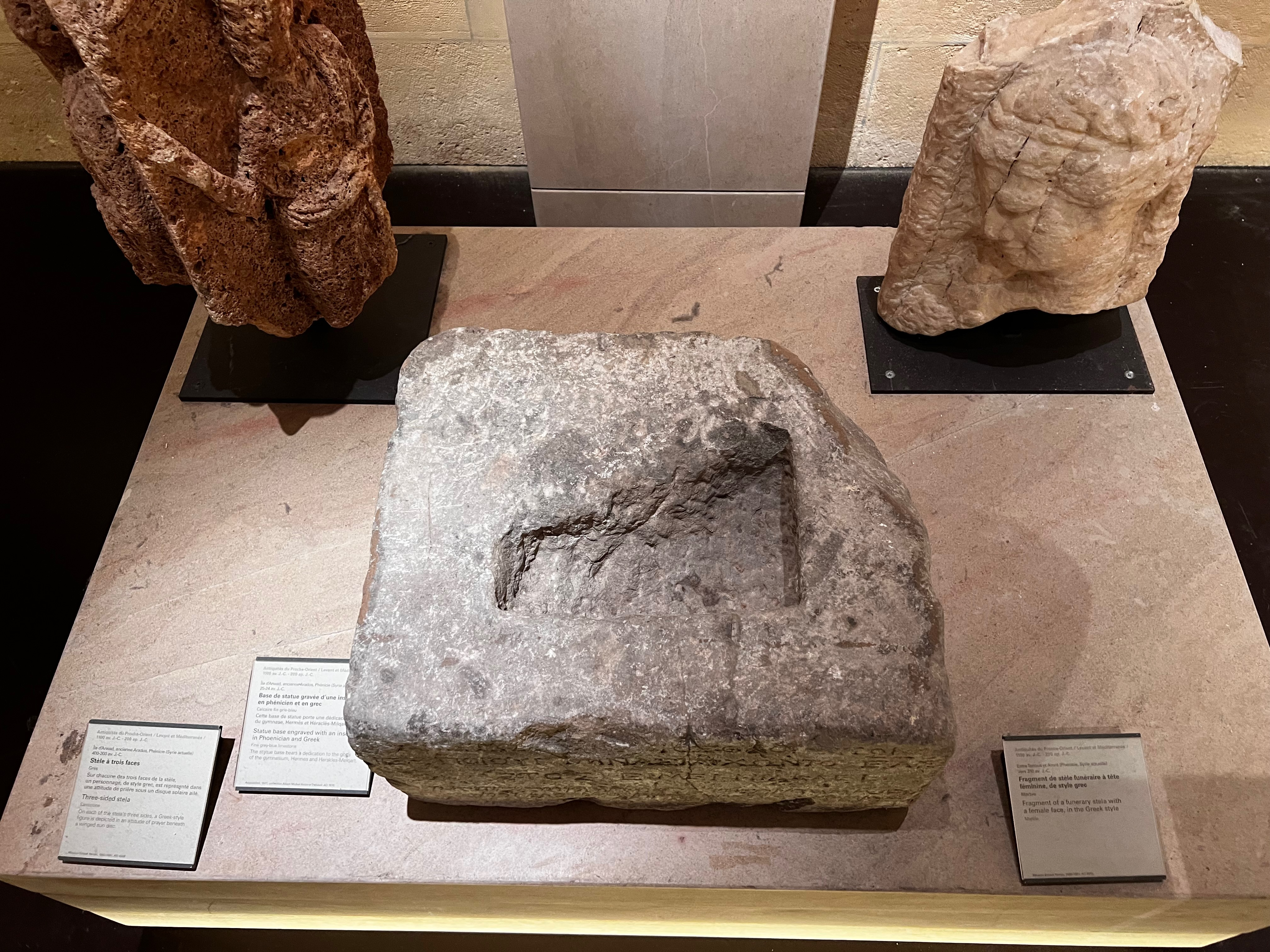

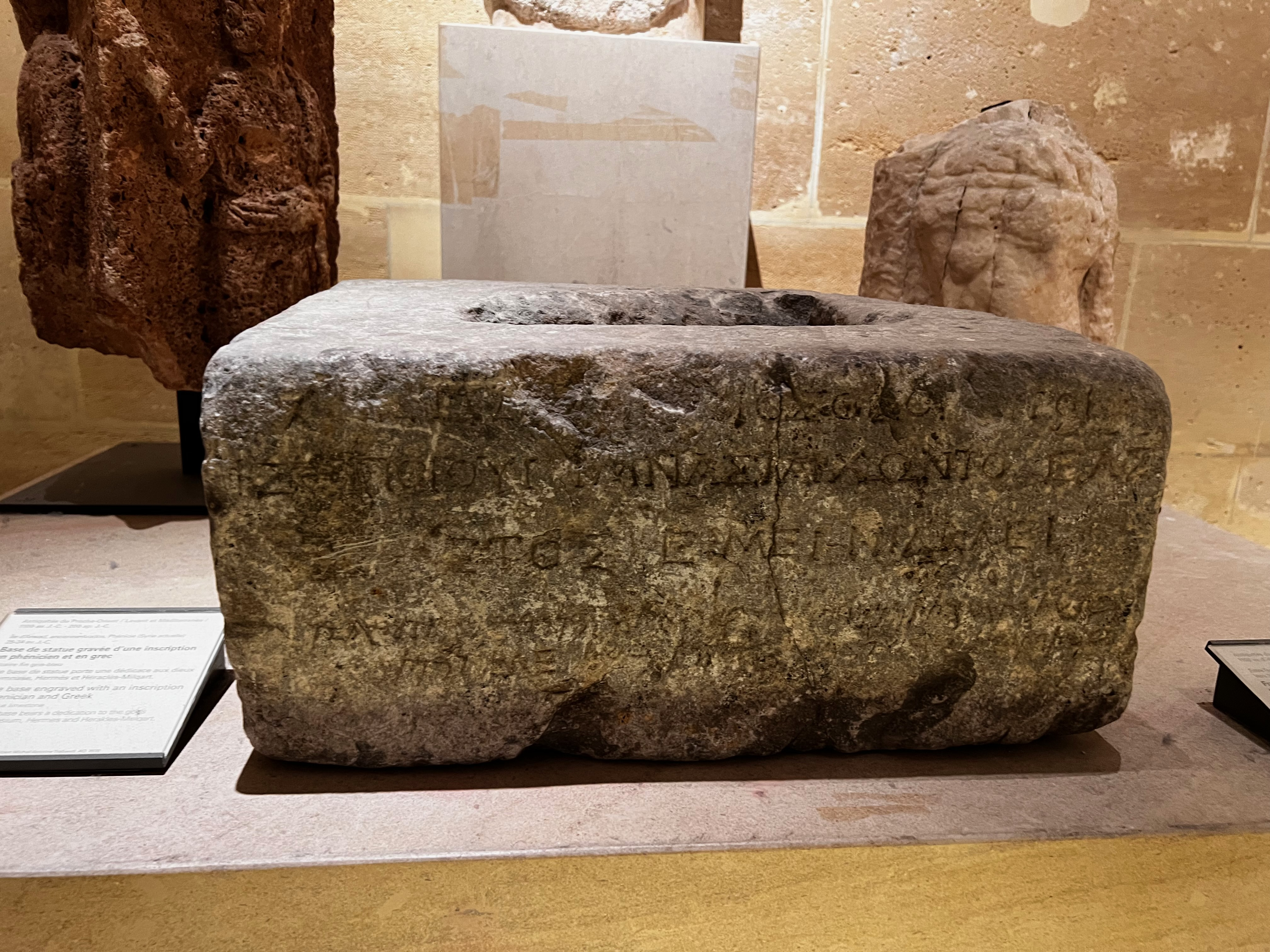

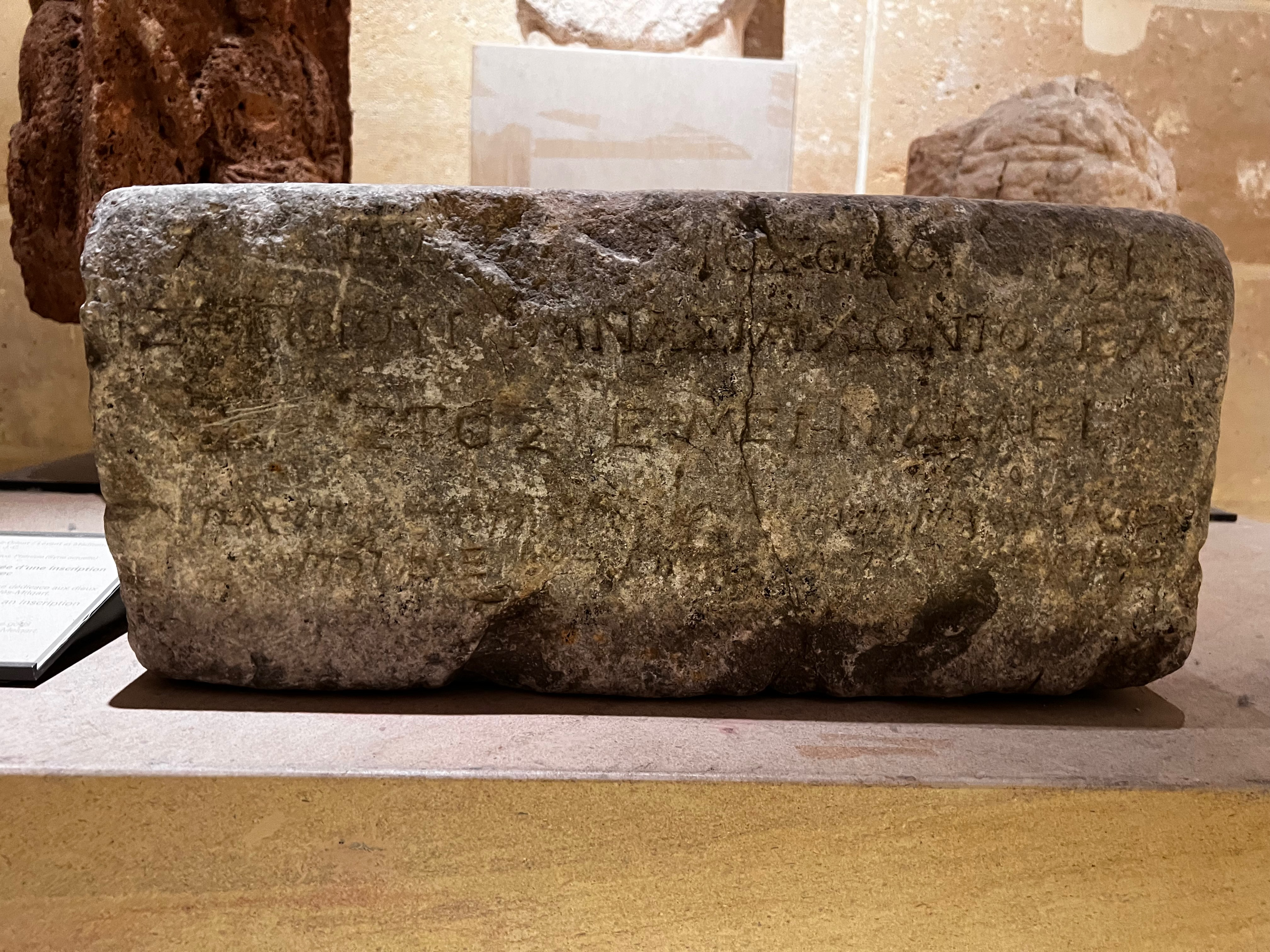

== Bibliography ==
- Françoise Briquel Chatonnet, 2013, Les inscriptions phénico-grecques et le bilinguisme des Phéniciens
