= Abydos Aramaic papyrus =

Aramaic Egyptian papyri

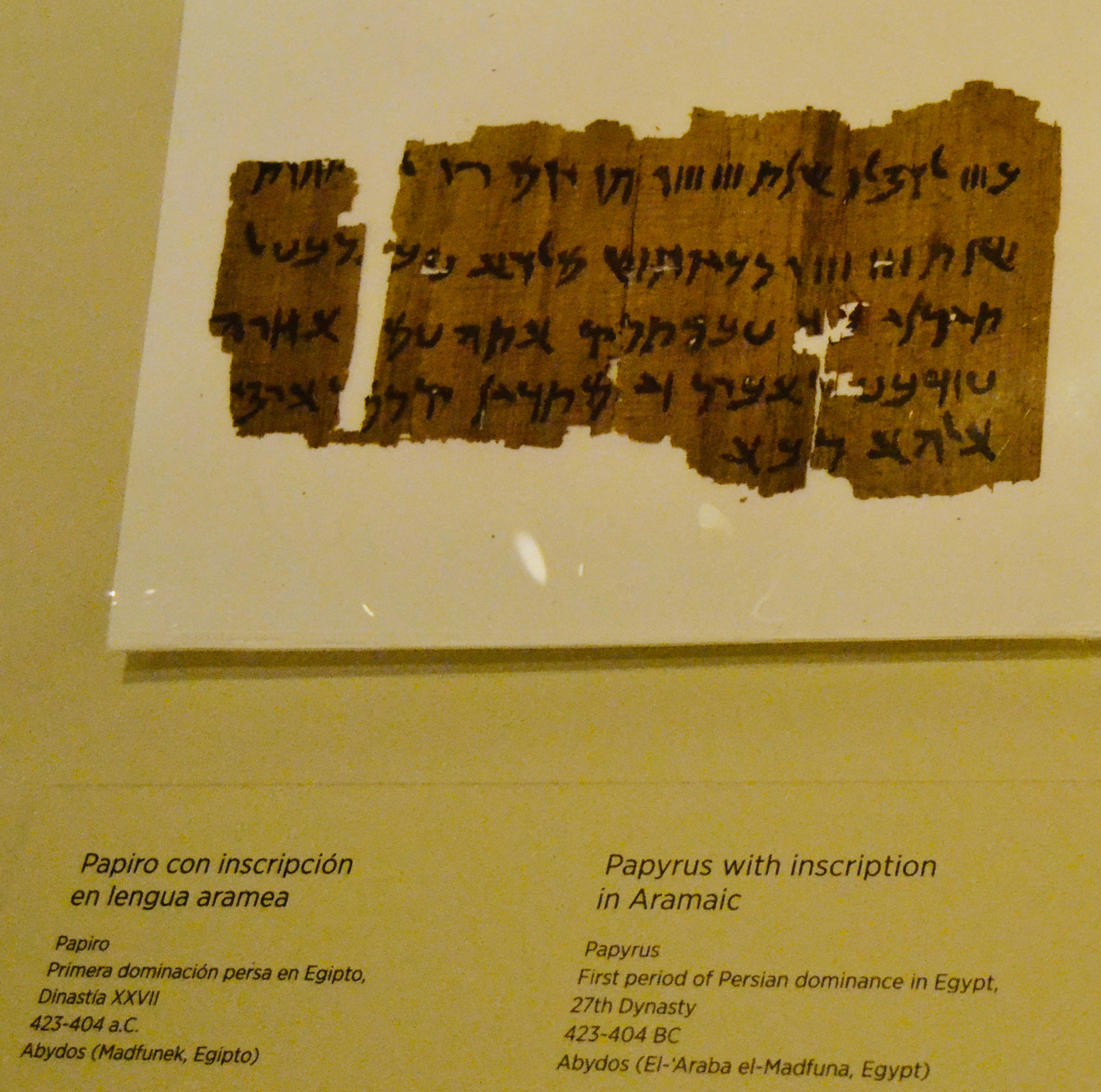
- The Abydos papyrus in the Madrid National Archaeological Museum of Madrid
- Created: 417 BC
- Discovered: 1964
- Present location: Madrid, Community of Madrid, Spain

The Abydos Aramaic papyrus, also known as the Madrid Papyrus, is an Aramaic papyrus purchased from an antiquities dealer by the National Archaeological Museum of Madrid in 1964. It was first published in 1964 by Javier Teixidor. The papyrus tells the story of two brothers who made a pilgrimage to Abydos, Egypt.

Its authenticity was challenged by Joseph Naveh in 1968; this assessment was disputed by Teixidor four years later.

The inscriptions reference to the "7th year of Darius", assumed to be Darius II, implies a dating of 417 BCE.

It is currently on display in the National Archaeological Museum of Madrid.

It is also known as TSSI II 29.
