= Pierides Kition inscriptions =

Phoenician inscriptions

The Pierides Kition inscriptions are seven Phoenician inscriptions found in Kition by Demetrios Pierides in 1881 and acquired by the Louvre in 1885.

== Concordance ==
| Image | CIS I | AO | Ledrain | KI | NSI |
|---|---|---|---|---|---|
| | 12 | 1454 | 132 | | |
| | 13 | 1455 | 130 | 20 | 14 |
| | 40 | 1451 | 134 | | |
| | 50 | 1453 | 135 | 25 | |
| | 51 | 1452 | 131 | | |
| | 52 | 1449 | 133 | | |
| | 53 | 1450 | 136 | 26 | |
