= Phoenician Sphinx inscription =

Phoenician inscription

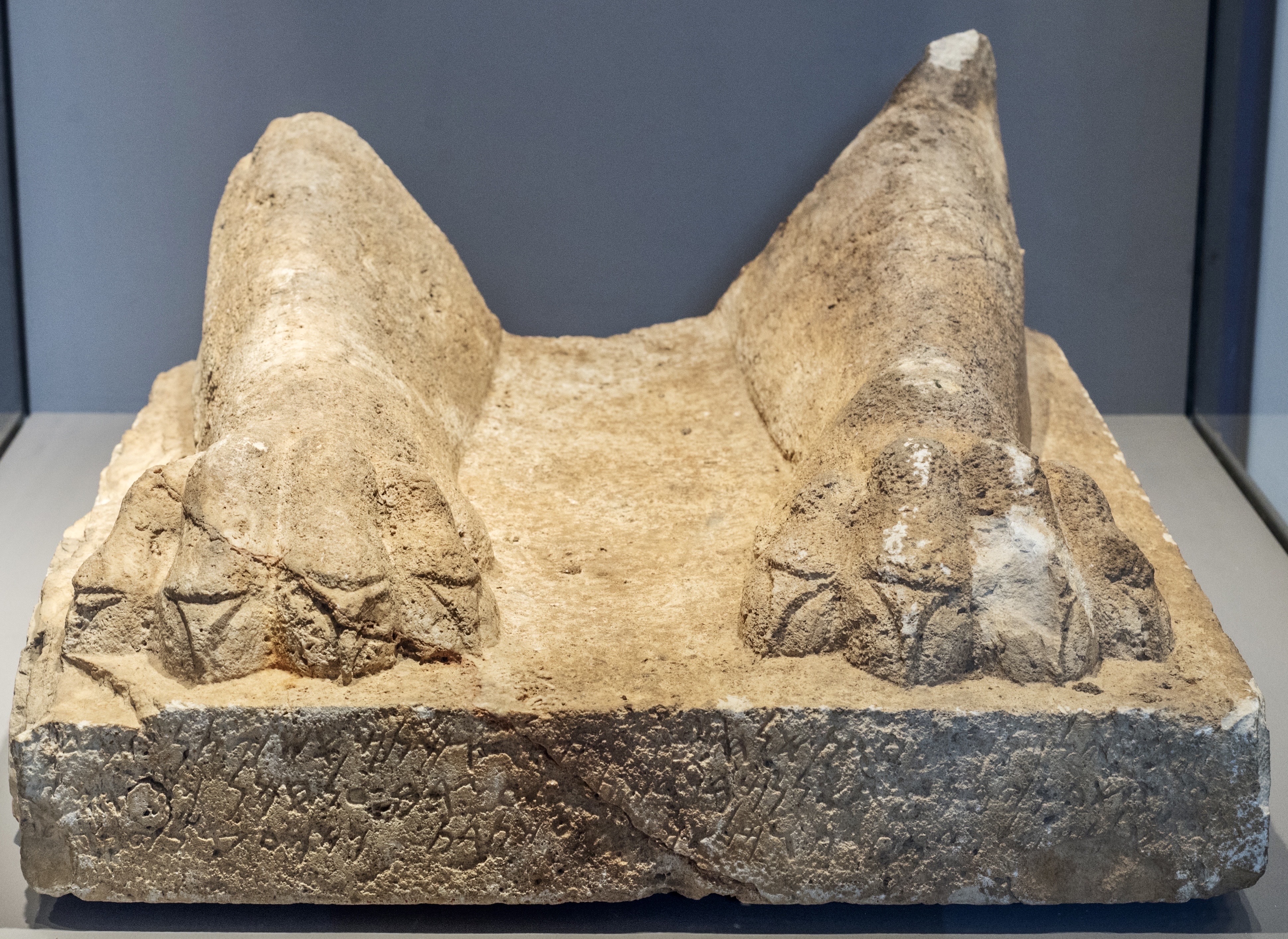
The Phoenician Sphinx inscription

The Phoenician Sphinx inscription, also known as the Abdadoni inscription, is an inscription found at Umm al-Amad, Lebanon.

The inscription is written on the socle of a statue of a couching sphinx, with only the feet and ankles still attached. The body of the sphinx was found lying next to it, but the head was not found. The inscription stated that the statue was dedicated to Milk'ashtart El - Hammon.

It was found to the right of an entrance to one of the buildings on the east side, at the edge of the street. It was one of a number of sphinx fragments found at the site. It is thought that the entrance to the temple complex was flanked by two such sphinx statues.

It is currently in the National Museum of Beirut.

It was first published in 1962 by Maurice Dunand and Raymond Duru, although likely discovered previously.

The inscription reads:

𐤋𐤀𐤃𐤍𐤉 𐤋𐤌𐤋𐤊𐤏𐤔𐤕𐤓𐤕 𐤀𐤋 𐤇𐤌𐤍 𐤊[𐤊]𐤓𐤕 𐤇𐤓𐤑 𐤔𐤕𐤌 𐤀𐤔 𐤉𐤕𐤍 𐤏𐤁𐤃𐤊	lʾdny lmlkʿštrt ʾl ḥmn k[k]rt ḥrṣ štm ʾš ytn ʿbdk	To my lord Milkashtart, god of Hammon, two talents of gold that gave your servant
𐤏𐤁𐤃𐤀𐤃𐤍𐤉 𐤁𐤍 𐤏𐤁𐤃𐤀𐤋𐤍𐤌 𐤁[𐤍] 𐤏𐤔𐤕𐤓[𐤓]𐤕𐤏𐤆𐤓 𐤁𐤏𐤋 𐤇𐤌𐤍 𐤊𐤌 𐤀𐤌𐤉	ʿbdʾdny bn ʿbdʾlnm bn ʿštr[r]tʿzr bʿl ḥmn km ʾmy	Abdadoni son of Abdalonim son of Ashtartazor, a citizen of Hammon. Like his mother
𐤋 𐤄𐤀𐤋𐤍𐤌 𐤌𐤋𐤊𐤏𐤔𐤕𐤓𐤕 𐤅𐤌𐤋𐤀𐤊 𐤌𐤋𐤊𐤏𐤔𐤕𐤓𐤕 𐤊 𐤔𐤌𐤏 𐤒𐤋 𐤉𐤁𐤓𐤊	l hʾlnm mlkʿštrt wmlʾk mlkʿštrt k šmʿ ql ybrk	were to him the gods Milkashtart and the emissary/emissaries of Milkashtart. For he heard his voice, may he bless him.

== Bibliography ==
- Dunand, M.; Duru, R. (1962). Oumm el-'Amed: une ville de l'époque hellénistique aux échelles de Tyr ... (in French). Librairie d'Amérique et d'Orient. pp. M. 435, Plate XXX.
- Krahmalkov, Charles. “NOTES ON THE INSCRIPTION OF ’BD’DNY FROM UMM EL-’AMED.” Rivista Degli Studi Orientali 46, no. 1/2 (1971): 33–37. http://www.jstor.org/stable/41880192.
- A. Caquot. "Le dieu Mikastart et les inscriptions d'Oum el-Ahmed", Semitica, XV, 1965
