= Carthaginian slaughterhouse inscription =

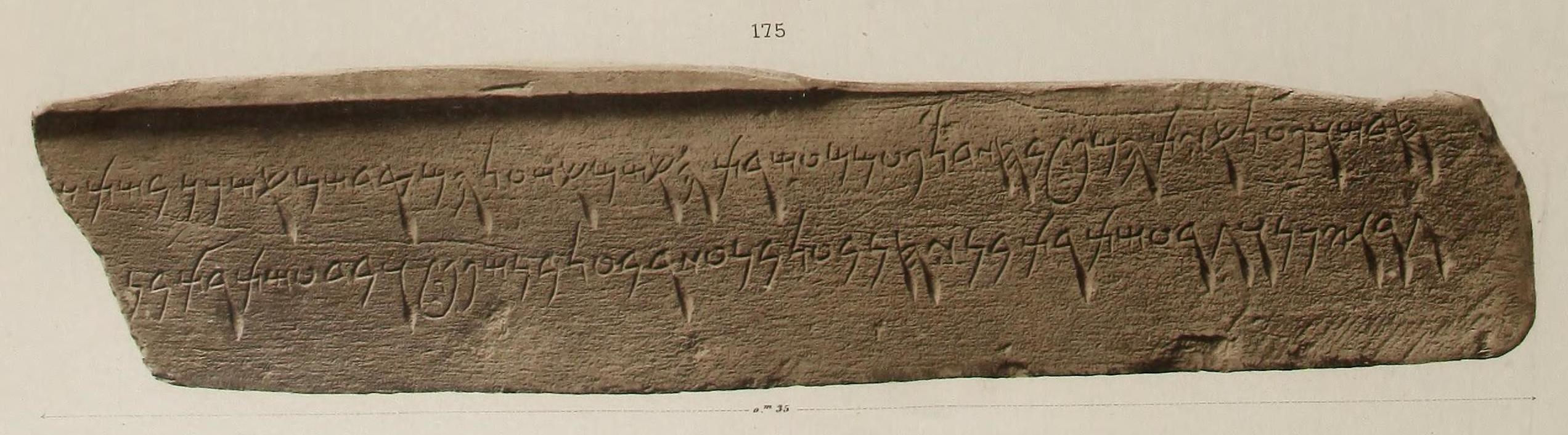
The Carthaginian slaughterhouse inscription in the Corpus Inscriptionum Semiticarum (CIS I 175)

The Carthaginian slaughterhouse inscription is a notable Punic inscription from Carthage published in 1871, currently held in the British Museum (ID number BM 125263. One of 10 inscriptions collected by Anglican clergyman William Fenner, based in La Goulette, Tunis, and given to Julius Euting for publication. Euting had numbered it Carthage 195, having numbered his collection beginning at 120, picking up after the numbering published two years previously in 1869 by Paul Schröder in his Die Phönizische Sprache. It is known as CIS I 175, NSI 46, KAI 80 and KI 68.

== Inscription ==
𐤇𐤃𐤔 𐤅𐤐𐤏𐤋 𐤀𐤉𐤕 𐤄𐤌𐤈𐤁𐤇 𐤆 𐤃𐤋 𐤐𐤏𐤌𐤌 𐤏𐤔𐤓𐤕 𐤄𐤀𐤔𐤌 𐤀𐤔 𐤏𐤋 𐤄𐤌𐤒𐤃𐤔𐤌 𐤀𐤔 𐤊𐤍 𐤁𐤔𐤕 𐤔

𐤂𐤓𐤎𐤊𐤍 𐤅𐤂𐤓𐤏𐤔𐤕𐤓𐤕 𐤁𐤍 𐤉𐤇𐤍𐤁𐤏𐤋 𐤁𐤍 𐤏𐤆𐤓𐤁𐤏𐤋 𐤁𐤍 𐤔𐤐𐤈 𐤅𐤁𐤃𐤏𐤔𐤕𐤓𐤕 𐤁𐤍

The Decemvirs in charge of the sanctuaries renovated and made this slaughter-house (?) ? steps: which was in the year of the s[uffetes....] Ger-sakun and Ger-ashtart, son of Yaḥon-baal, son of 'Azru-ba'al, son of Shafat, and Bod‘ashtart, son....

== Bibliography ==
- Euting, Julius (1871). Punische Steine. Mémoires de l'Académie Impériale des Sciences de St.-Pétersbourg (in German). Académie impériale des sciences de St.-Pétersbourg.
