= Zincirli stele =

Zincirli stele usually refers to one of a number of steles found in the archaeological site of Zincirli:

- Kilamuwa Stela
- Kilamuwa scepter
- Victory stele of Esarhaddon
- Hadad Statue
- Panamuwa II inscription
- Bar-Rakib inscriptions
- Stele of Ördek-Burnu
- Kuttamuwa stele, a stele found in 2008 dedicated to "Kuttamuwa servant of Panamuwa"
- Pancarli Hoyuk inscription
