= Kuttamuwa =

Kuttamuwa was an 8th-century BC royal official from Aramean city Samʾal named on the Kuttamuwa stele, that was to be erected upon his death. The inscription in Aramaic requested that his mourners commemorate his life and his afterlife with feasts "for my soul that is in this stele". It is one of the earliest references to a soul as a separate entity from the body. The 800-pound basalt stele is three feet tall and two feet wide. It was uncovered in the third season of excavations by the Neubauer Expedition of the Oriental Institute in Chicago, Illinois. The official publication was by Dennis Pardee, “A New Aramaic Inscription from Zincirli.” Bulletin of the American Schools of Oriental Research, no. 356, 2009, pp. 51–71
