= Bar-Rakib inscriptions =

Group of 8th-century BC steles

The Bar-Rakib inscriptions are a group of 8th-century BC steles, or fragments of steles, of King Bar-Rakib, from Samʾal.

The inscriptions were discovered during the 1888–1911 German Oriental Society expeditions led by Felix von Luschan and Robert Koldewey.

Their Aramaic inscriptions are written in Luwian-style raised characters, and represent some of the first known inscriptions to use Imperial Aramaic. Older inscriptions found at Samʾal were written in the "Samalian language" or the Phoenician language.

== Table ==
Name	Image	Current location	Description	First published	Reference
Bar Rakib I (KAI 216)		Museum of the Ancient Orient	Twenty lines, recounting the construction of the second palace between 732 and 727 B.C.E.	1891	
Bar Rakib II (KAI 218)		Vorderasiatisches Museum Berlin, VA 02817	Short inscription that states, "My lord is Baal Harran. I am Bar Rakkib, son of Panamu."	1891	
Bar Rakib III (KAI 219)		Vorderasiatisches Museum Berlin	Three small fragments	1891	
Bar Rakib IV (KAI 220)		Vorderasiatisches Museum Berlin	Three small fragments	1891	
Bar Rakib V (KAI 221)		Vorderasiatisches Museum Berlin	Three small fragments	1891	
Bar Rakib VIII (KAI 217)		Vorderasiatisches Museum Berlin, S 06581	Incomplete fragment of nine lines; at the right, a bearded man holds a drinking vessel and a fan. Symbols of deity appear at the top. In the inscription, Bar Rakkib declares his loyalty to Tiglath Pileser, "lord of the four quarters of the earth," and expresses the favor shown to him by the god Rakkab El.	1891	

== Gallery ==
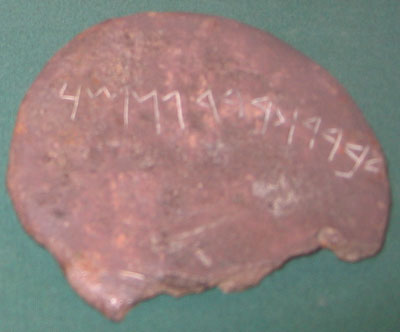
Bar-Rakib silver ingot in the British Museum (BM 134918)

== Bibliography ==
- Halévy, J., "La première inscription araméenne de Barrekoub ou A1." RevSém 3 (1895b): 394–95.
- Müller, D.H., "Die Bauinschrift des Barrekub." WZKM 10 (1896): 193–97 + 1 pl..
- Winckler, H., "Die Bauinschrift Bar-rekub's aus Sendschirli." MVAG 1 (1896): 198–202.
- Halévy, J., "La première inscription de Bar-Rekoub revue et corrigée." RevSém 4 (1896a): 185–87.
- Hoffmann, G., "Zur Bauinschrift des Barrekab." ZA 11 (1896a): 317–22.
- Halévy, J., "Le texte définitif de l'inscription architecturale araméenne de Barrekoub." RevSém 5 (1897): 84–91.
- Peiser, F.E., "Aus dem kaiserlich-ottomanischen Museum in Constantinopel." OLZ 1 (1898): 6–9.
- Halévy, J., "Nouvel examen des inscriptions de Zindjirli." RevSém 7 (1899): 333–55
- Halévy, J., "Un bas-relief à inscription araméenne de Barrekoub." RevSém 3 (1895a): 392–94
- Müller, D.H., "Die Bauinschrift des Barrekub." WZKM 10 (1896): 193–97 + 1 pl.
- Luschan, F. von, "Bildwerke und Inschriften." Pp. 325–80 In Ausgrabungen in Sendschirli, IV., Berlin: G. Reimer, 1911
- Halévy, J., "Les deux inscriptions hétéennes de Zindjîrlî." RevSém 1 (1893–94): 138–67, 218-58, 319-36; 2:25-60
- Sachau, E., "Baal-Harrân in einer altaramäischen Inschrift auf einem Relief des Königlichen Museums zu Berlin." SPAW 8 (1895): 119–22
