= Tilmen Hoyuk =

Archaeological site in Islahiye, Gaziantep, Turkey

Tilmen Höyük
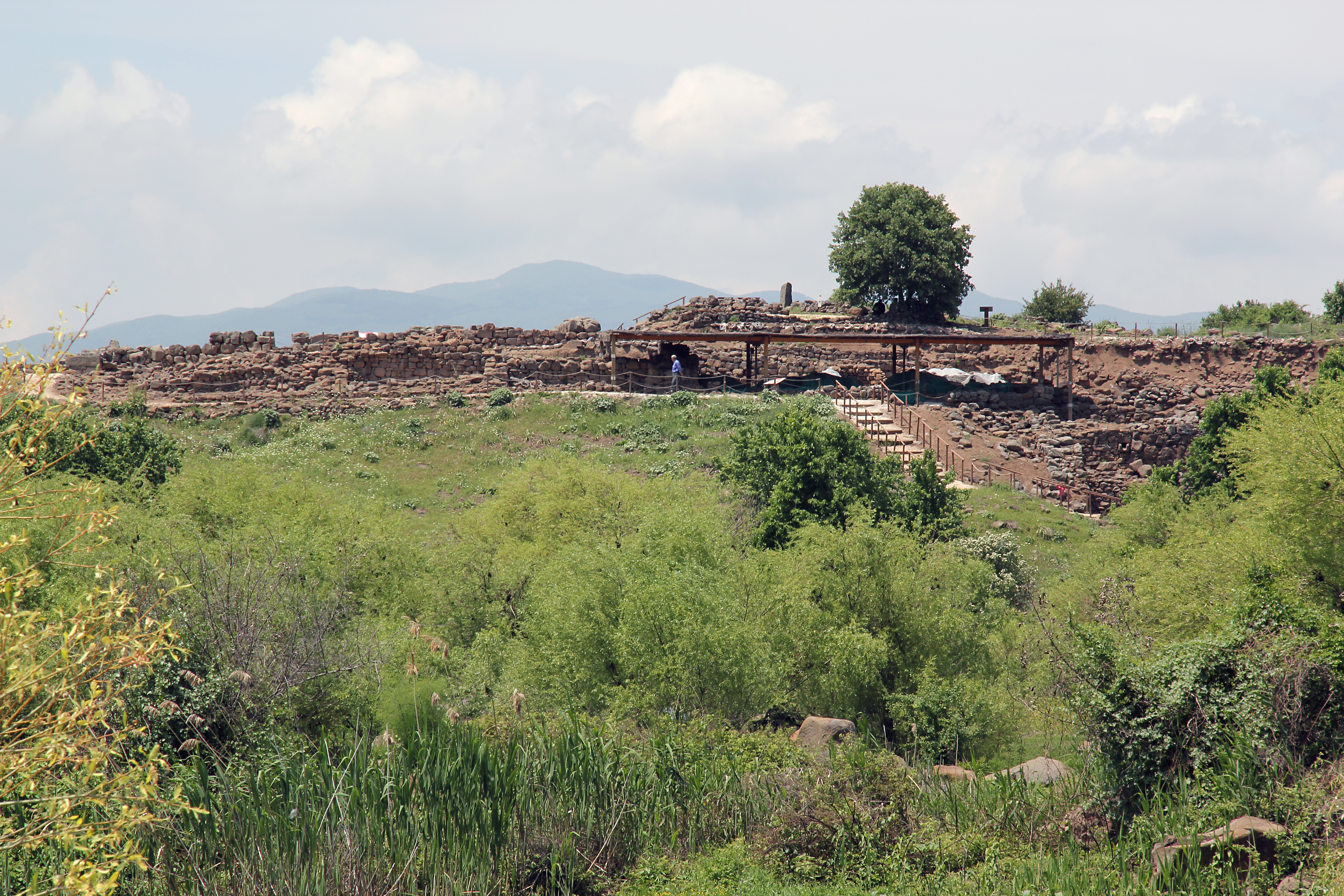
- Ancient city of Tilmen Höyük

- Location within Turkey
- 37°01′48.216″N 36°42′15.214″E
- Type: Settlement
- Location: Gaziantep Province, Turkey

History
- Built: 4th millennium BC

Tilmen Höyük (also Tilmen Hüyük) is an archaeological mound located near the town of Islahiye, in the Gaziantep province of Turkey. It is 225 meters in diameter and 21 meters high on the shores of Karasu River. It is located on the western edge of the Sakçagözü Plain. It is very near the Amanos Mountains.

== History ==
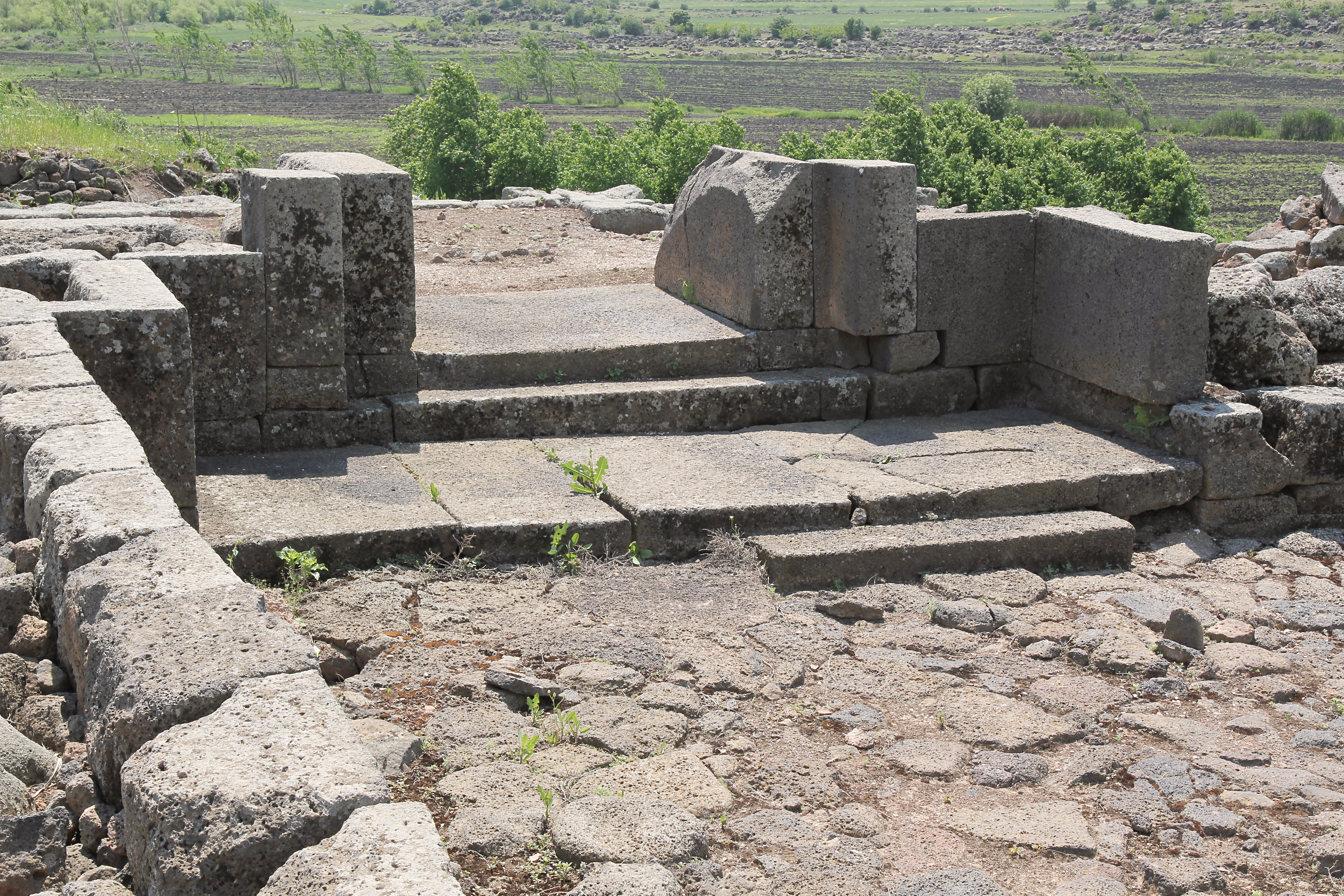
King's palace at Tilmen Höyük

The mound rises 20 meters above the vast marshes of Karasu River. The river flows on the eastern and northern edges of town. The archaeological site of Zinjirli is also located nearby, up only 10km north along the Karasu River.

- Late Chalcolithic Age (3,600 - 3,100 BC)
- Early Bronze Age (3rd millennium BC)
- Middle Bronze Age (2,000 - 1,600 BC)
- Late Bronze I (1,600 - 1,400 BC)
- Late Roman period
- Early Byzantine/Early Islamic Period

=== Early Bronze Age ===
The settlement on the mound began in the 4th millennium BC. It became a large city at the end of the 3rd millennium BC.

According to the excavator there was an extensive conflagration level between levels IIIb (Early Bronze IVb) and IIIc (Middle Bronze I) after which a completely new type of pottery appeared.

=== Middle Bronze Age ===
The high point of the city was between the 19th and 15th centuries BC. The finds indicate that Tilmen Höyük was an important link in the cultural contacts between Northern Mesopotamia and Anatolia.

==== Middle Bronze IIA ====
Yamhad period. One of the monumental structures unearthed is very similar to the palace in Alalah in Amik Plain (7th stratum). Alalah was part of the kingdom of Yamhad, an Amorite kingdom centered mainly in Aleppo. Tilmen was one of the 20 kingdoms of Yamhad.

Clay bulla. A classic Old Syrian Bulla (seal) was found the palace area in earlier excavations in 1962. The 'Old Syrian period' is generally defined as the time of the rise and predominance of Yamkhad in upper Syria. The clay bulla was found at the mound, and it is believed to be from the first half of the 2nd millennium BC. This find suggests the existence of a Babylonian trading station at Tilmen going back to the early Old Babylonian period.

Tilmen stela. An Old Syrian stela was discovered in Tilmen in 2004. It was found in the western lower town, in a monumental in antis temple and its temenos in Area M. The stela measures 67 cm in height, and 53 cm in width. It portrays a standing god with his cap with two opposite horns, and an important local official.

According to the archaeologist Nicolò Marchetti,

"This sculpture is the most ancient piece thus far retrieved in Gaziantep area and it is one of the few provenanced Old Syrian sculptures found outside of Ebla. This find also supplies an important piece of evidence for setting the scope of the activities of high-ranking personages within Old Syrian society: that a dignitary at the very end of the MBA represented himself on a stela dedicated to a deity in its temple seems significant if one compares this pattern with that of Old Babylonian Mesopotamia."

==== Middle Bronze IIB-C ====
Old Hittite period. In the second half of the 17th century BC, the Hittite Great King Ḫattušili I led a military campaign into the Amuq plain and against Aleppo: at that time Tilmen Höyük was destroyed in a major fire. The city is probably to be identified with ancient Zalbar, mentioned in the Annals of Hattusili I, the capital of Zalbar kingdom. It is also known as Zalbar or Zalwar. The city of Zalpa was formerly equated by scholars with Zalpuwa (Zalpuwa) in Anatolia, located to the north of Ḫattuša near the Black Sea.

== Excavations history ==
The excavations were started in 1959 by Dr. Bahadır Alkım and continued until 1972. Also in 1959, excavations were conducted in Gedikli Karahöyük, a nearby settlement. Excavations were also carried out in 1969-1972.

The recent excavations were started in 2003 by a joint Turco-Italian team directed by Nicolò Marchetti from the University of Bologna Bologna University, in collaboration with Dr. Refik Duru of Istanbul University.

Work has created since 2007 an archaeological park. This is a very rich ancient cultural area with over fifty mounds identified on the surrounding plain.

== Excavations results ==
The double casemate walls of the city were made of large stones without mortar, and date from the end of the 2nd millennium BC to the beginning of the 1st millennium BC.

Two basalt gate lions were found next to the monumental gate on the east side of the city, which was the main entrance gate. There are two smaller gates, one in the northwest and the other in the southwest. Rectangular defence towers around the perimeter were also constructed, and there was a casemate fortification system.

The buildings were made of basalt, which is abundant in the area; adobe construction was used only on the upper part of the walls.

== See also ==
- Cities of the ancient Near East
- Titris Hoyuk
- Coba Höyük
- Samʼal

== Bibliography ==
- R. Duru, Excavations at Tilmen Höyük I. Tilmen Höyük Kazıları I, Türk Tarih Kurumu, Ankara 2013.
- Marchetti, N. (2008). A preliminary report on the 2003 and 2004 excavations at Tilmen Höyük. In Proceedings of the 4th International Congress of the Archaeology of the Ancient Near East (Vol. 2, pp. 353-360)
- Marchetti, N. (2008). A preliminary report on the 2005 and 2006 excavations at Tilmen Höyük. In Proceedings of the 5th International Congress on the Archaeology of the Ancient Near East, Madrid April 3-8 2006: Actas del V Congreso Internacional de Arqueología del Oriente Próximo Antiguo (pp. 465-479). Universidad Autónoma de Madrid
- Marchetti, N., Matthiae, P., Pinnock, F., Nigro, L., & Marchetti, N. (2010). A preliminary report on the 2007 and 2008 excavations and restorations at Tilmen Höyük. In Proceedings of the 6th International Congress on the Archaeology of the Ancient Near East (pp. 369-383)
- Marchesi, G., & Marchetti, N. (2019). A babylonian official at Tilmen Höyük in the time of king Sumu-la-el of Babylon (Tab. I-XII). Orientalia, 88(1), 1-36
- Nicolò Marchetti: La cittadella regale di Tilmen Höyük. Palazzi, templi e fortezze del II millennio a.C. in un'antica capitale dell'Anatolia sud-orientale (Turchia) In: Maria Teresa Guaitoli u. a. (Hrsg.): Scoprire. Scavi del Dipartimento di Archeologia. Bologna, Ante Quem 2004, ISBN 88-900972-6-4, S. 191–196.
- Nicolò Marchetti: Middle Bronze Age Public Architecture at Tilmen Höyük and the Architectural Tradition of Old Syrien Palaces. In: Ina Kibrāt Erbetti. Studi di archeologia orientale dedicati a Paolo Matthiae. Rom, Università La Sapienza 2006, ISBN 88-87242-73-9, S. 275–308.
- Nicolò Marchetti: The 2005 joint turkish-italian excavations at Tilmen Höyük. In: 28. Kazi Sonuçları Toplantısı Bd. 2. Ankara, Kültür ve Turizm Bakanlığı 2007, ISBN 978-975-17-3244-6, S. 355–364.
