= Samalian language =

Extinct Northwest Semitic language of the northern Levant

Samalian
- Native to: Samʼal
- Extinct: 1st millennium BC
- Language family: Afro-Asiatic: Semitic; West Semitic; Central Semitic; Northwest Semitic; Aramoid?; Samalian

Language codes
- ISO 639-3: None (mis)
- Glottolog: sama1317

Samalian is an extinct Semitic language spoken and first attested in Samʼal. It is primarily known from three inscriptions, the Hadad Statue and the Panamuwa II inscription (KAI 214–215), both unearthed in the late 19th century, and a third known as the Kuttamuwa stele, unearthed in 2008.

== Classification ==
Among the Semitic languages, Samalian shows most similarities to Aramaic. It has been earlier often considered an outright early dialect of Aramaic, possibly influenced by Canaanite. Strong evidence is however absent, and Samalian is best considered an independent member of the Northwest Semitic group, or, together with South Gileadite, a sister variety of Aramaic in an "Aramoid" or "Syrian" group.

== Linguistic features ==
Features connecting Samalian with Aramaic include:

- a change *n > r in the word br 'son', though this is attested only as a part of personal names and may not have been the native word. The same phenomenon appears also in a Phoenician text from Sam'al (the Kilamuwa Stela).
- loss of *ʔ in the word ḥd (< *ʔḥd) 'one'. This occurs sporadically also in biblical Hebrew and in the Phoenician dialect of Byblos.
- a change *ɬʼ > q, e.g. ʔrq 'earth', known as an orthographic device also in Old Aramaic (in later Aramaic, Proto-Semitic *ɬʼ shifts instead to /ʕ/).
- appearance of n for final m.

Pat-El & Wilson-Wright propose as additional general characteristics of Samalian the development of nasal vowels, as expected word-final n after long vowels is systematically absent in the Panamuwa inscriptions; as well as an object marker wt, cognate with Aramean ləwāt 'with'.

== See also ==
- Dialect continuum
