= Sam'al lions =

Coordinates: 52°31′15″N 13°23′47″E

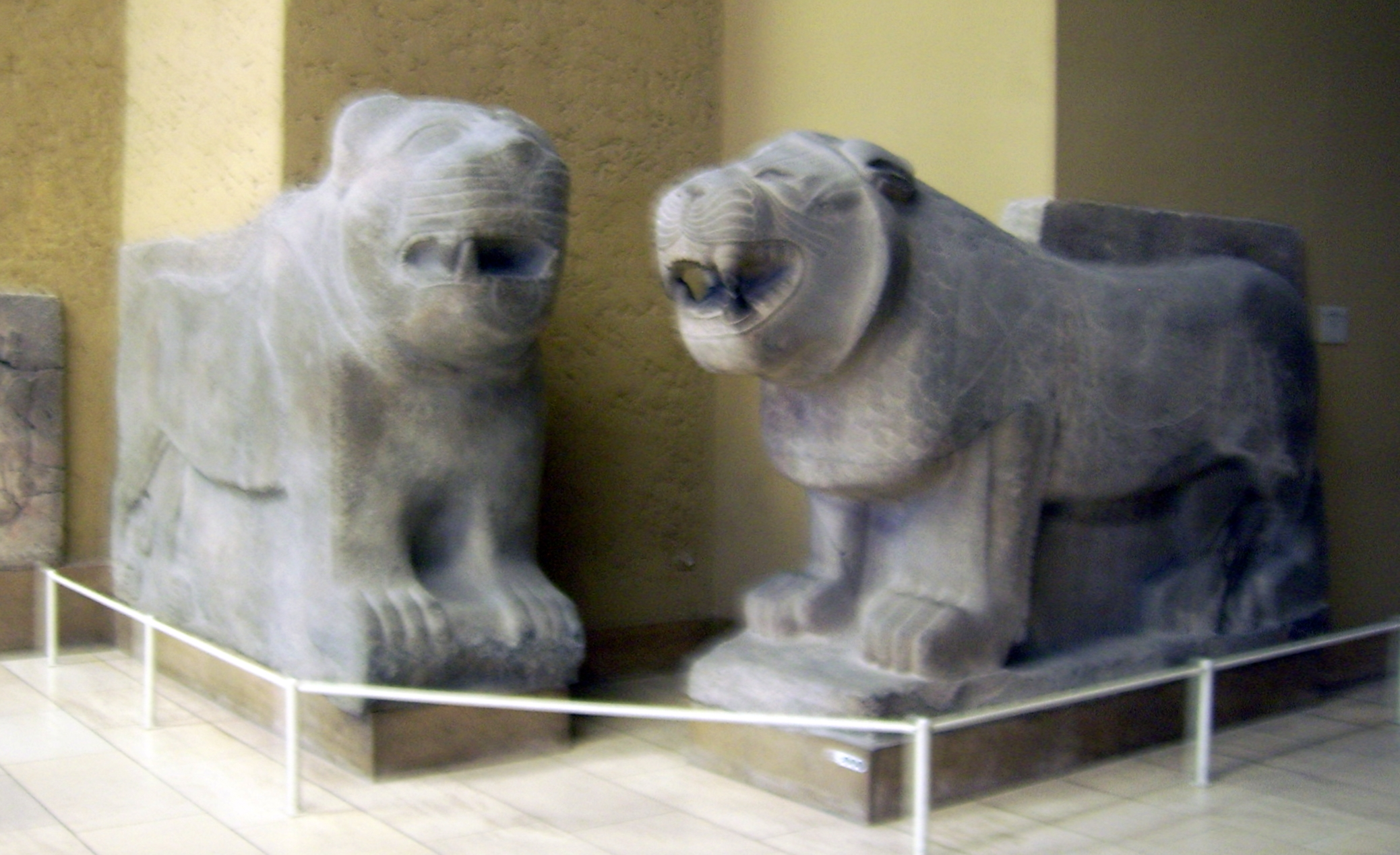
Lions from the left side (left lion is a plaster cast)

The Sam'al lions are a number of statues of lions from Sam'al, the modern Zincirli, Turkey, which are in the Vorderasiatisches Museum Berlin (Pergamon Museum), the Museum of the Ancient Orient (Istanbul) and the Louvre.

== Pergamon lions ==
The lions are made from dolerite. They are 1.9 metres high, 2.9-3.05 metres long and 0.85-.0.9 metres wide. The four statues have the inventory numbers VAG 1042, VA 2719, VA 2718 und VA 3001. Three of the lions are originals, and one is a plaster cast.

The lions have been dated from between the 10th and 8th centuries BC. They probably belong to the inner part of the east gate of the city, but were discovered in a secondary deposit. All four lions differ from one another in details. The differences are so great that current scholarship argues that the outer lions must date to the 10th century BC and the inner lions to the 8th century. Both statues stand nearly square with one another. The sides are only carved in shallow relief. The later lions have been created by reworking older statues. They are more detached from the walls than the older ones and details such as the manes and extremities have been more starkly worked. In addition, the mouths are opened wider, and give a more threatening impression. The lions served as orthostates and thus had both a decorative and a structural role.

The lions are displayed in room 2 (Syria and Asia Minor) of the Pergamonmuseum. They form an ensemble with other parts of the City gate of Sam'al and are located at the opposite end of the processional way of Babylon from the Ishtar Gate. The statues were found by the Orient-Comité excavations in 1890/91 and brought to Berlin as partage (which was common at the time).

== Istanbul lions ==
Two associated lion statues are now on display in the Istanbul Museum of the Ancient Orient.

== Gallery ==
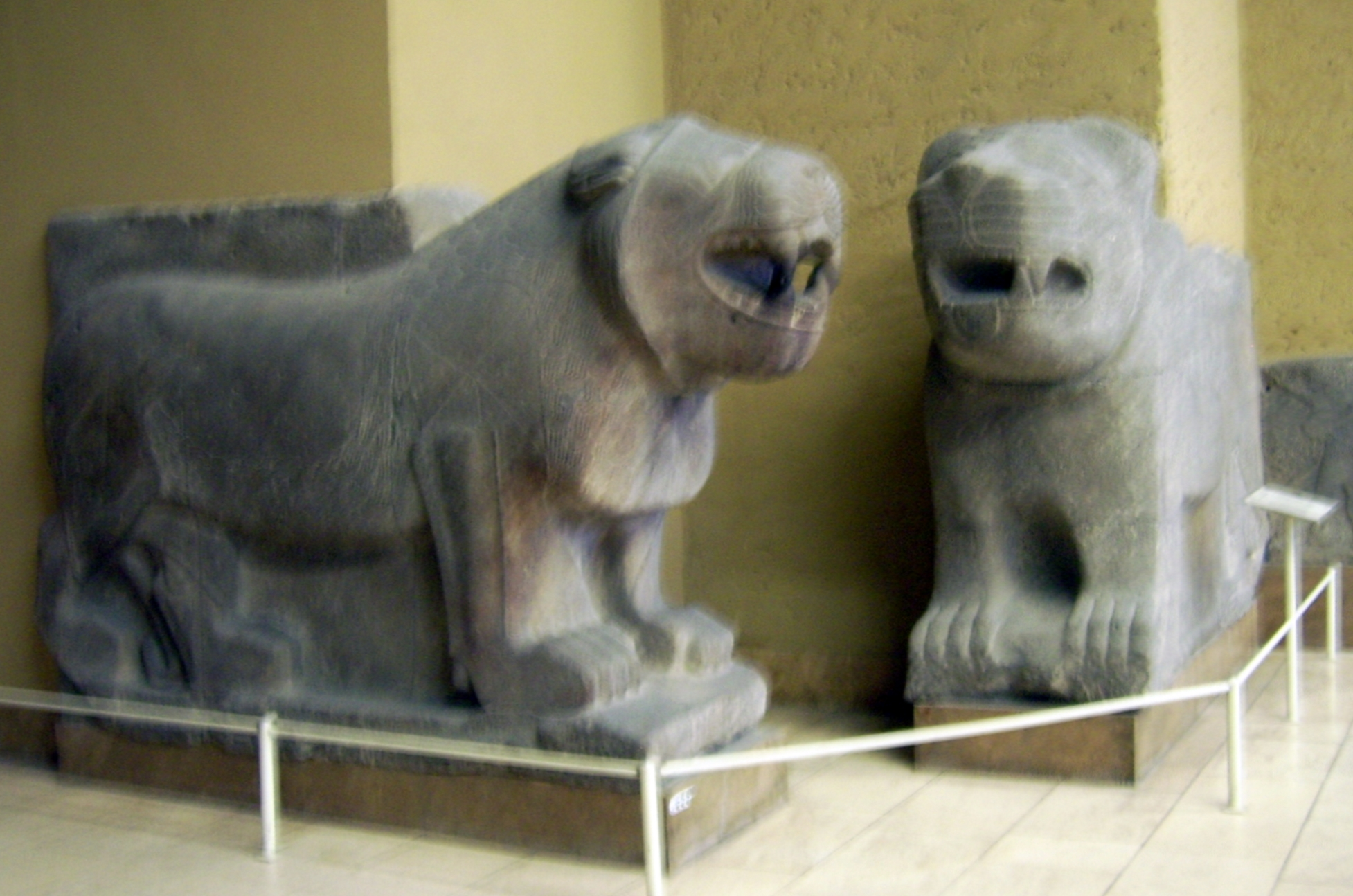
Lions from the right side, with the later lion at left and the older one at right (Pergamon)

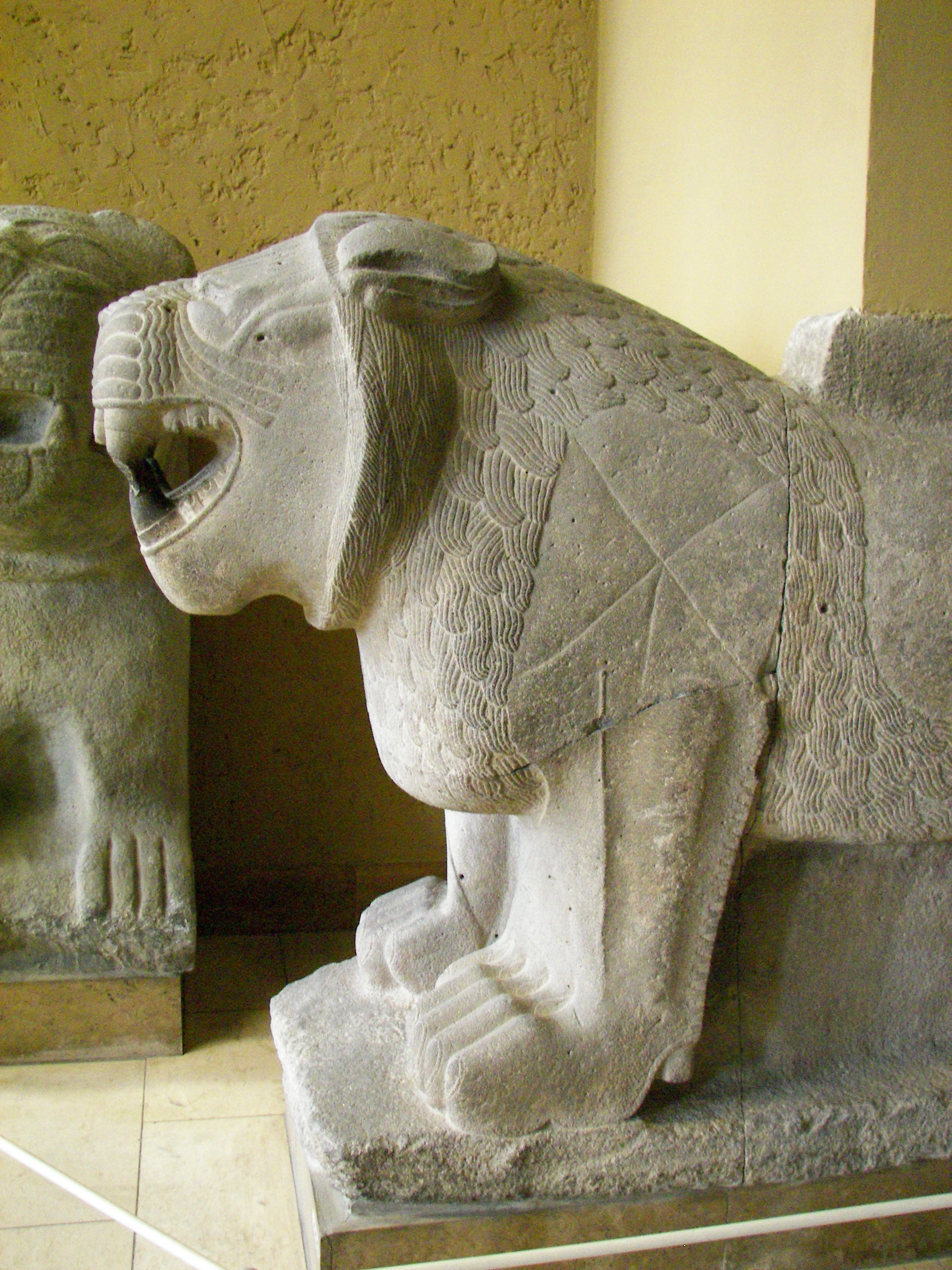
Head of the left later lion (Pergamon)

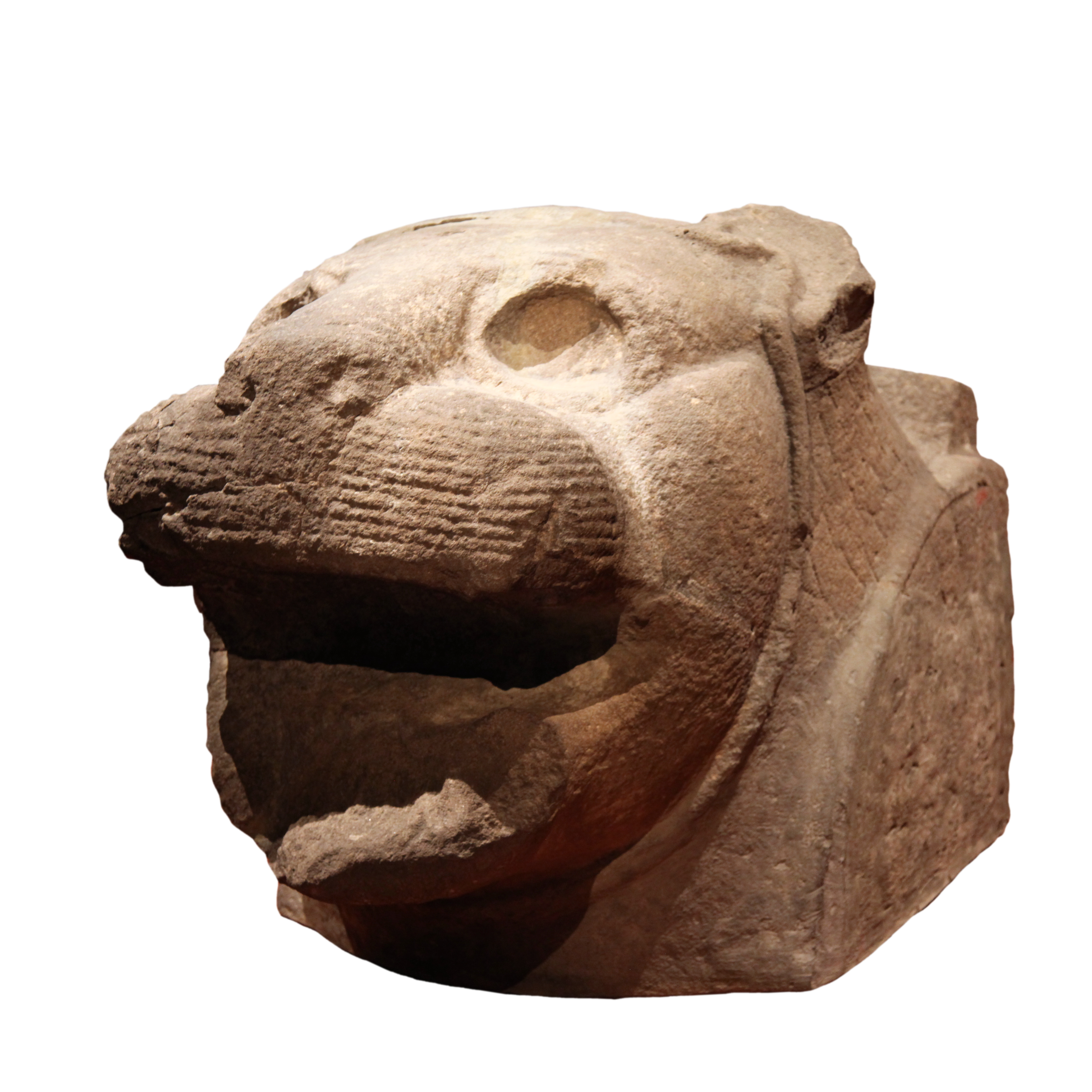
Louvre lion head from Sam'al

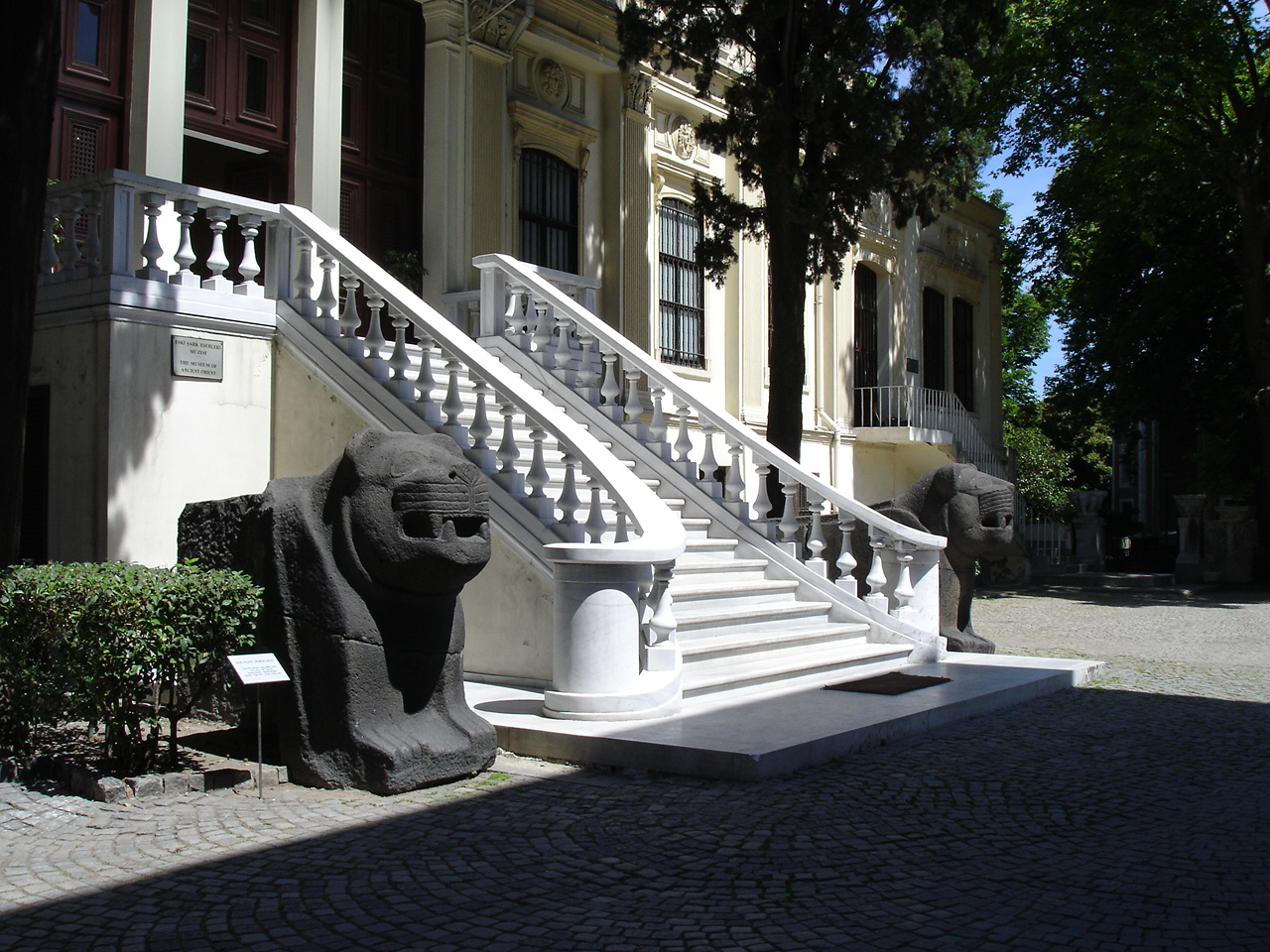
Outside the Museum of the Ancient Orient, Istanbul

== Bibliography ==
- Ralf-B. Wartke, "Rekonstruktion eines Burgtores (mit Blick in Richtung Prozessionsstraße und Istar-Tor)," and "Zwei Torlöwen," in Liane Jakob-Rost et al., Das Vorderasiatische Museum, von Zabern, Mainz 1992, pp. 218–221
