= Kilamuwa scepter =

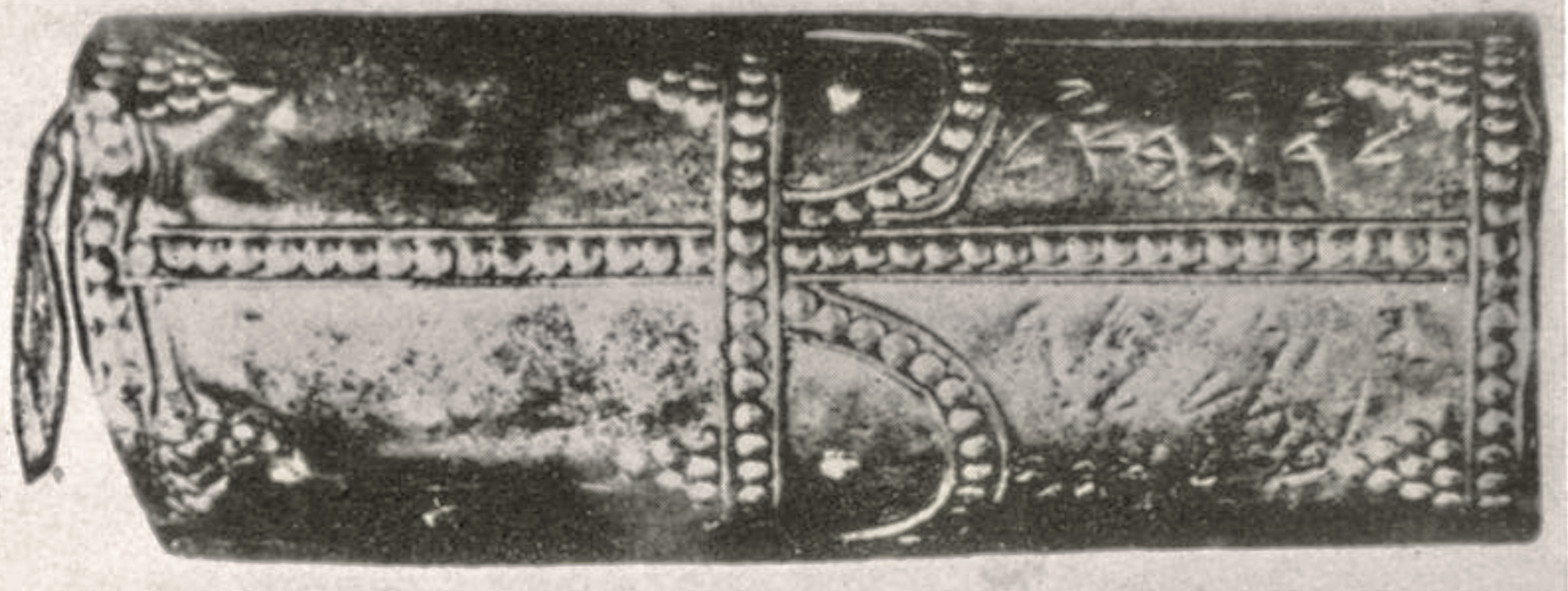
Kilamuwa scepter in the Pergamon Museum

The Kilamuwa scepter or Kilamuwa sheath is a 9th-century BCE small gold object inscribed in Phoenician or Aramaic, which was found during the excavations of Samʾal in 1943. It was found in burned debris in a corridor at the front of the "Building of Kilamuwa".

King Kilamuwa is believed to have ruled in the area of Samʾal in ca. 830 - 820 BC.

The object measures 6.7×2.2 cm, and is ornamented with soldered gold wire and gold plates; two of the rectangular plates are inscribed with a total of seven lines or writing. Felix von Luschan concluded that it was once on the handle (or sheath) of a staff or scepter.

== Text ==
Line number	Phoenician script inscription	Transliteration	Translation by Galling
1	𐤎𐤌𐤓𐤆𐤒𐤍	smr z qn	This smr
2	𐤊𐤋𐤌𐤅	klmw	Kilamuwa
3	𐤁𐤓𐤇𐤉	br ḥy	son of Ḥay(a),
4	𐤋𐤓𐤊𐤁𐤀𐤋	l Rkbʾl	(made) for (the god) RKBʾL
5	𐤉𐤕𐤍𐤋𐤄𐤓	ytn lh r	May R(-KBʾL) grant him
6	𐤊𐤁𐤀𐤋	kbʾl	(R)-KBʾL
7	𐤀𐤓𐤊𐤇𐤉	ʾrk ḥy	length of life

The inscription reads as follows: This smr Kilamuwa, son of Ḥay(a), made for (the god) RKBʿL. May RKB'L grant him length of life.

== Bibliography ==
- Felix von Luschan, Die Kleinfunde von Sendschirli . Herausgabe und Ergänzung besorgt von Walter Andrae (Mitteilungen aus den orientalischen Sammlungen, Heft XV; Berlin 1943) 102, Abb. 124, Tf. 47f-g (the book was reviewed by K. Galline; in BiOr 5 fl948] 115–120).
- Dupont-Sommer, A. “Une Inscription Nouvelle Du Roi Kilamou et Le Dieu Rekoub-El” Revue de l’histoire Des Religions 133, no. 1/3 (1947): 19–33
- Galling, Kurt. “The Scepter of Wisdom: A Note on the Gold Sheath of Zendjirli and Ecclesiastes 12: 11” Bulletin of the American Schools of Oriental Research, no. 119 (1950): 15–18. https://doi.org/10.2307/3218799
- Swiggers, P. “The Aramaic Inscription of Kilamuwa” Orientalia 51, no. 2 (1982): 249–53.
