= Stele of Ördek-Burnu =

Ancient Aramaic stele

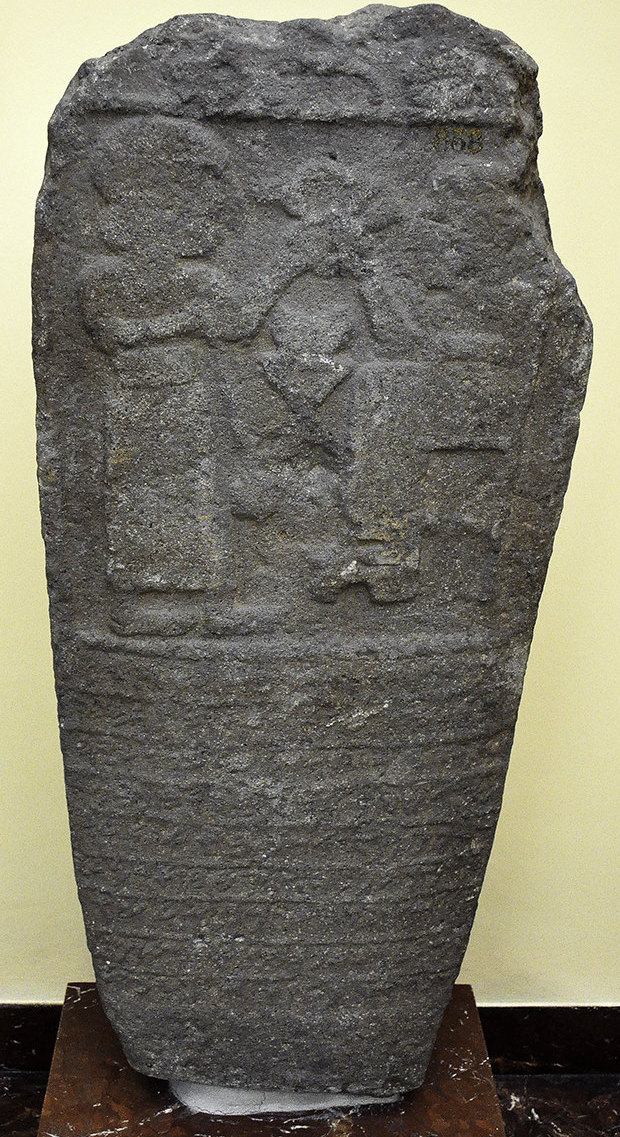
- Stele of Ordek-Burnu in the Istanbul Museum of the Ancient Orient
- Created: c. 850 BC
- Discovered: before 2014
- Present location: Istanbul, Turkey

The Stele of Ördek-Burnu is a partially deciphered stele found in Ördek-Burnu, 20 km (8 miles) south of the city of Samʾal (Zincirli, İslahiye), dates to the 9th century BCE.

It is kept at the Museum of the Ancient Orient, Istanbul, with ID number 7696.

It was discovered in 1888 by Felix von Luschan during the first excavation of Samʾal, and published in his fourth volume of Sendschirli in 1911. von Luschan wrote:

Between two rocky elevations—Katranlı Dağ and Ördek-Burnu—lies a gently sloping, very fertile small plain, bounded on the east by the Kara Su, in which, it is said, for centuries some ten or twelve Kurdish families have regularly pitched camp during the winter months. For as long as they can remember, these families have used the stone as a surface on which to beat felt, so that its somewhat imperfect state of preservation in places, despite its smooth surface, is not surprising.

== Description ==
The stele is a funerary monument commemorating a royal woman. Its front face combines a relief of a ceremonial meal with a nine-line inscription in the Aramaic alphabet, written in the Sam’alian dialect, plus a tenth line on the left edge.

== Inscription ==
The stele was undeciphered for more than a century, having been labeled “non-Semitic” by Mark Lidzbarski in 1915. In 1932, Helmuth Theodor Bossert published a partial translation, having correctly identified the language as West Semitic, but his article was overlooked by later scholarship and major corpora of Canaanite and Aramaic inscriptions. In 2013, André Lemaire and Benjamin Sass published a partial translation, confirming the language as Samʾalian Aramaic.

The second half of the inscription is easier to decipher; the deceased requests that sacrifices be made in her name to the gods and at the royal necropolis. The inscription shows a personal name beginning with “Piya-”.

Lemaire and Sass’s translation is below:

| Line | Transliteration | Translation |
|---|---|---|
| 1 | [ʾ]n[k]-----n-------------y--- | I? [am PN]........................... |
| 2 | -----bny•blḥ(btḥ)---wbḥlbh | ...... my sons in ...... and in (the) kingship/succession |
| 3 | ----ysʿd•h---•ʿl•znn lyh | ...... he will affirm ............. on this. Let him |
| 4 | ny•ʾš[m]--s---bḥrb•wbny | do good for the na[me]...... by the sword. And my sons |
| 5 | --h--•hʾ•lrkbʾl•ʾlh | .......... (be) he to Rakib’il the/my god; |
| 6 | y nʿm•wḥny•hʾ•lkbb•ʾrm ly | agreeable and gracious / well placed (be) he to Kubaba of Aram. Let him |
| 7 | slʾ mnḥ- brkbʾl•šʾ | present an offering: for Rakib’il two sheep |
| 8 | yn•lym•wbkbb•šʾyn•lym | for the Day, and for Kubaba two sheep for the Day, |
| 9 | wbmqm•mlky•šʾyn•ly | and in the royal necropolis (“[resting] place of the kings”) two sheep for me. |
| 10 | wzy <y>hny•ʾšm•py-- thy•nbšh---l- | And he who will do good for the name of Piya-X let his ‘soul’ be ....... |

== Bibliography ==
- Lidzbarski, Mark (1915), "VI. Die Stele von Ördek-burnu", Ephemeris für Semitische Epigraphik (in German), III, Giessen: 192–206 (and plates 13–15)
- Lemaire, André; Sass, Benjamin (2013). "The Mortuary Stele with Samʾalian Inscription from Ördekburnu near Zincirli". Bulletin of the American Schools of Oriental Research. 369: 57–136. doi:10.5615/bullamerschoorie.369.0057. ISSN 0003-097X.
