= Panamuwa II inscription =

Ancient Samalian royal inscription

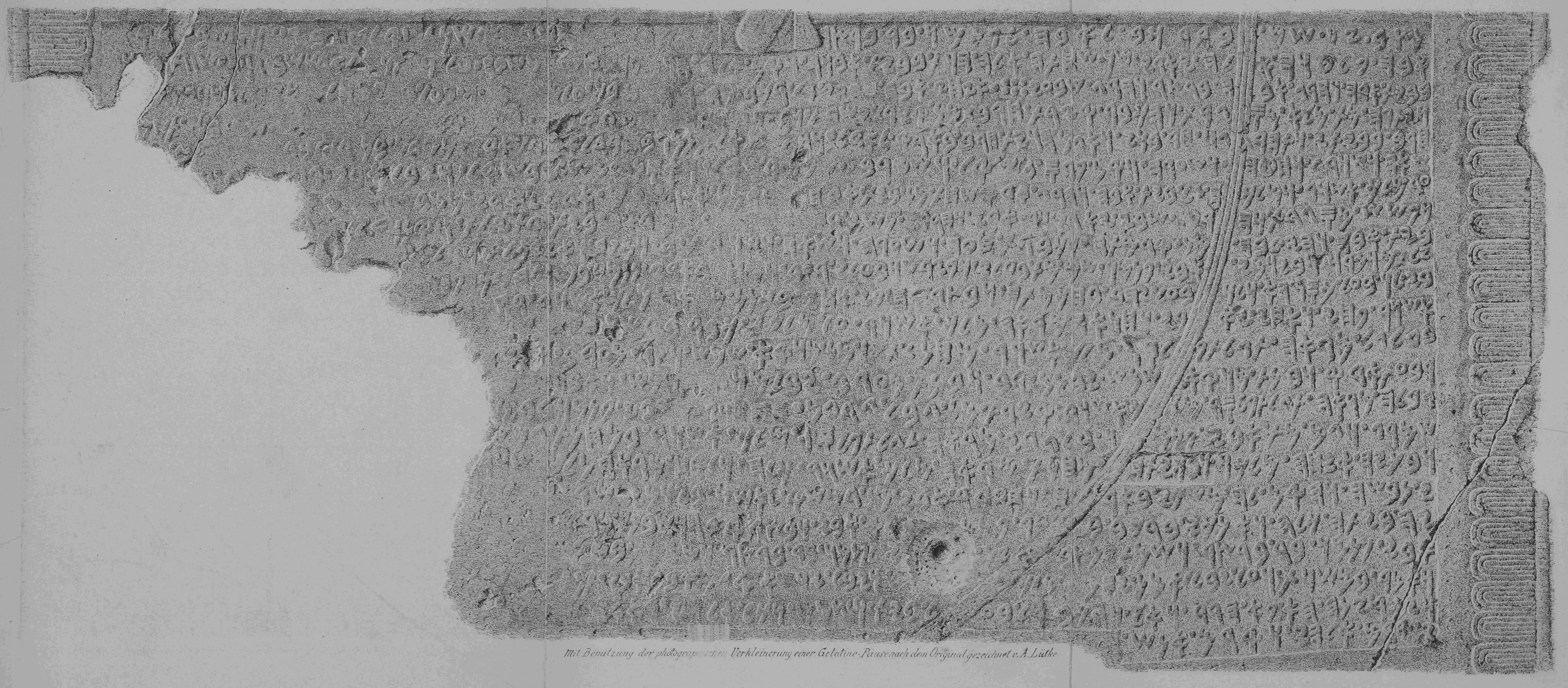
The inscription, in stretched form

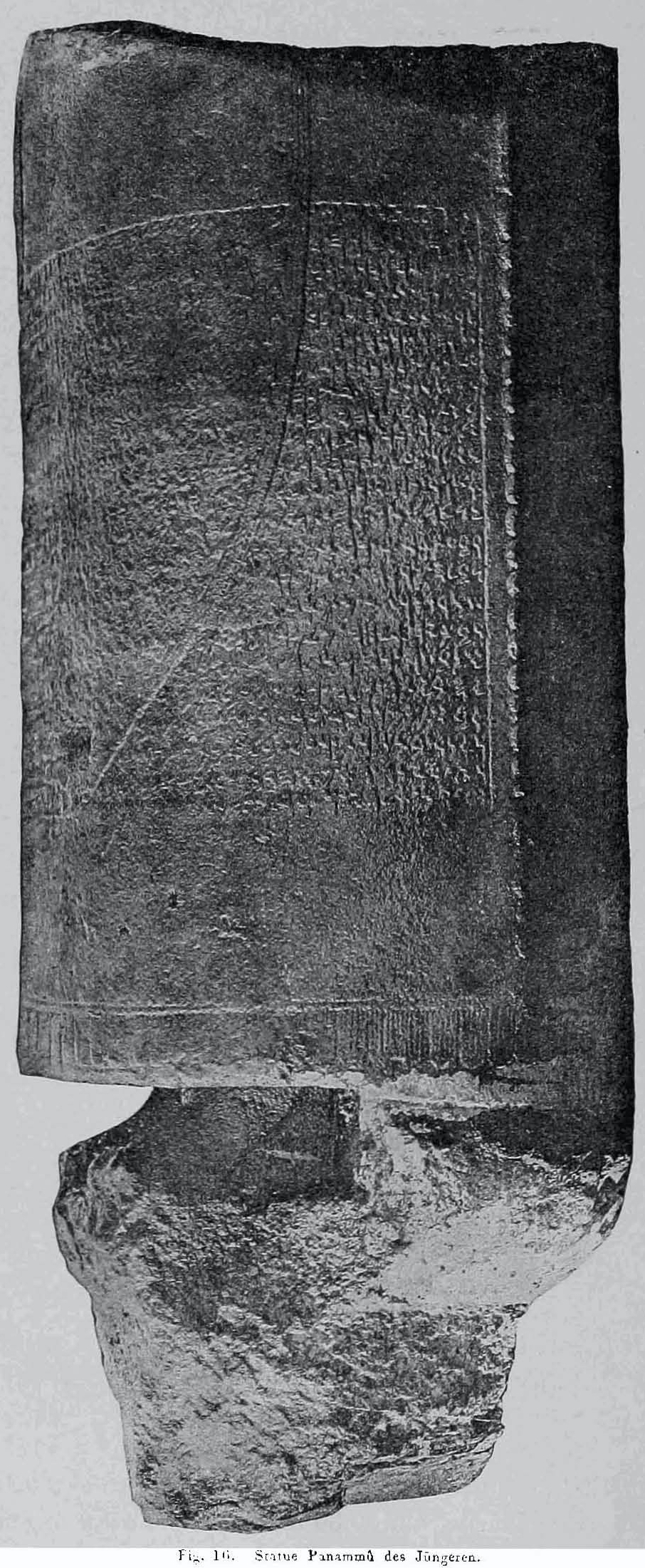
The Panamuwa II inscription

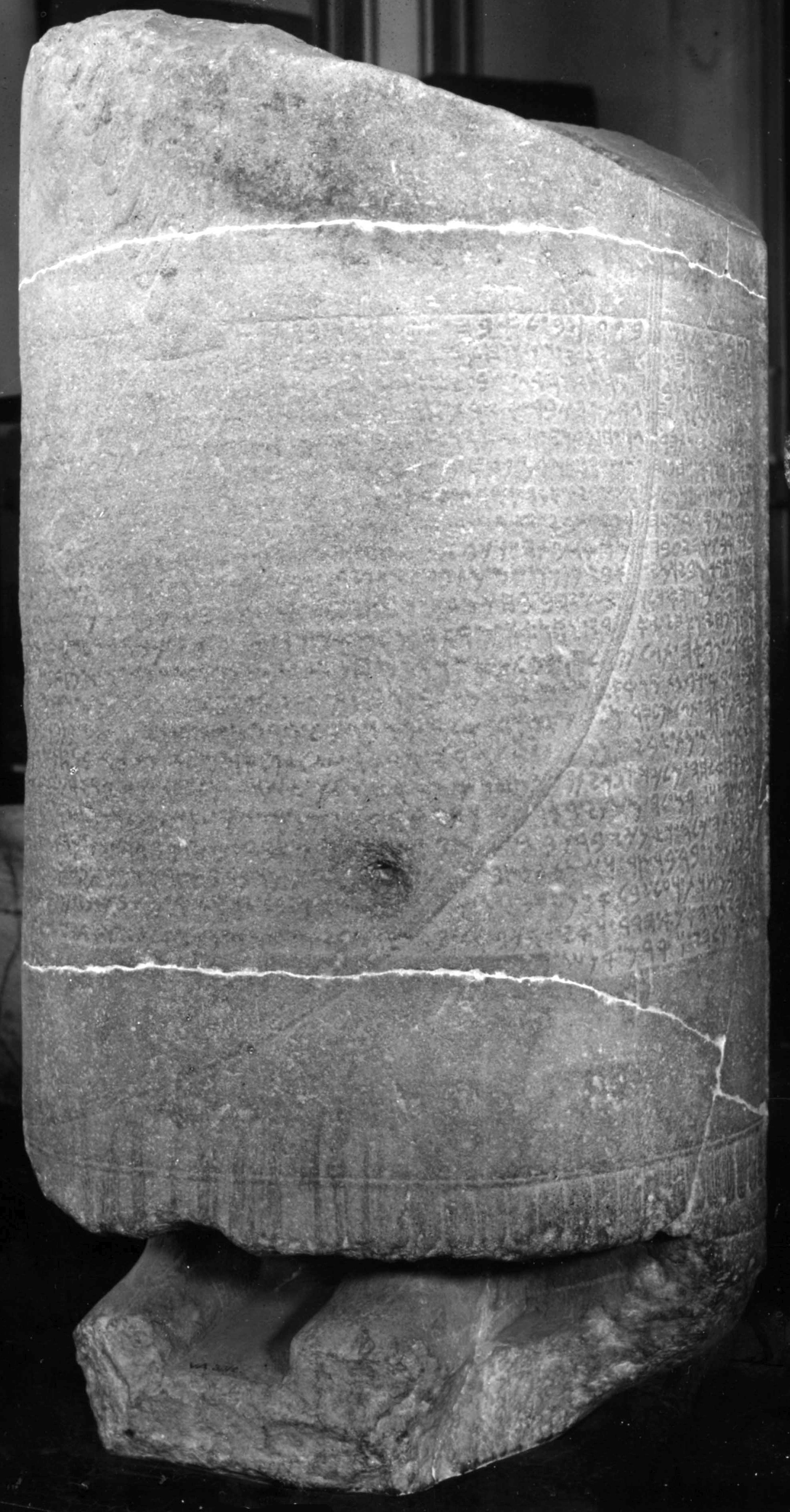
Panamuwa II inscription

The Panamuwa II inscription is a 9th-century BC stele of King Panamuwa II, from the Kingdom of Bit-Gabbari in Samʾal. It currently occupies a prominent position in the Vorderasiatisches Museum Berlin.

The 23 line inscription was discovered in 1888 during the 1888–1902 German Oriental Society expeditions led by Felix von Luschan and Robert Koldewey.

Similar to the Hadad Statue, the inscription is on the base of a pillar-shaped statue. It was written by Panamuwa II's son Bar Rakib in the Samalian language, considered to be on a dialect continuum between Phoenician and Aramaic. The inscription mentions Tiglath-Pileser III.

== Text ==
The text of the inscription below is presented in George Albert Cooke's 1903 "Text-book of North-Semitic Inscriptions: Moabite, Hebrew, Phoenician, Aramaic, Nabataean, Palmyrene, Jewish".

1. 𐤍𐤑𐤁 · 𐤆𐤍 · 𐤔𐤌 · 𐤁𐤓𐤓𐤊𐤁 · 𐤋𐤀𐤁𐤄 · 𐤋𐤐𐤍𐤌𐤅 · 𐤁𐤓 · 𐤁𐤓𐤑𐤓 𐤌𐤋̇𐤊̇ [𐤉𐤀𐤃𐤉].....𐤁 · 𐤔𐤍𐤕.𐤒̇𐤋..[𐤀]𐤁𐤉 · 𐤐̇𐤍𐤌̇𐤅̇ 𐤁..𐤒

2. 𐤀𐤁𐤄 · 𐤐𐤋𐤈𐤅𐤄 · 𐤀𐤋𐤄 · 𐤉𐤀𐤃𐤉 · 𐤌𐤍 · 𐤔𐤇𐤕𐤄 · 𐤀𐤋𐤄 · 𐤄̇𐤅𐤕 · 𐤁𐤁𐤉𐤕 · 𐤀𐤁𐤅𐤄 · 𐤅𐤒𐤌 · 𐤀̇𐤋̇𐤄 · 𐤄𐤃̇[𐤃]...𐤒...𐤌𐤔𐤁𐤄 · 𐤏̇𐤋 𐤅..𐤅..𐤀.𐤅𐤔𐤁.𐤅.𐤔𐤇𐤕...
3. 𐤁𐤁𐤉𐤕 · 𐤀𐤁𐤄 · 𐤅𐤄𐤓𐤂 · 𐤀𐤁𐤄 · 𐤁𐤓𐤑𐤓 · 𐤅𐤄𐤓𐤂 · 𐤔𐤁𐤏𐤉 ::: · 𐤀𐤉𐤇𐤉 · 𐤀𐤁𐤄 · .... · .𐤋 · 𐤓𐤊𐤁 · .𐤄̇ · ......𐤁𐤊 · 𐤏𐤋𐤌̇.....𐤊 · 𐤁𐤏𐤋 · ....𐤇𐤋.𐤋..𐤌𐤅 · ....
4. 𐤅𐤉𐤕𐤓𐤄 · 𐤌𐤕 · 𐤌𐤋𐤀 · 𐤌𐤎𐤂𐤓𐤕 · 𐤅𐤄𐤊𐤁𐤓 · 𐤒𐤉𐤓𐤕 · 𐤇𐤓𐤁𐤕 𐤌𐤍 · 𐤒𐤉𐤓𐤕 · 𐤉𐤔𐤁𐤕 · 𐤅..𐤍...........𐤒̇...................· 𐤔.... · 𐤕𐤔𐤌.
5. 𐤇𐤓𐤁 · 𐤁𐤁𐤉𐤕𐤉 · 𐤅𐤕𐤄𐤓𐤂𐤅 · 𐤇𐤃 ·𐤁𐤍𐤉 · 𐤅𐤀𐤂𐤌 · 𐤄𐤅𐤉𐤕 · 𐤇𐤓𐤁 · 𐤁𐤀𐤓𐤒 · 𐤉𐤀𐤃𐤉 · 𐤅𐤇̇𐤋..𐤀𐤋 𐤐𐤍𐤌𐤅 𐤁𐤓 𐤒𐤓𐤋 · 𐤀... · 𐤀𐤁𐤉...𐤌 · 𐤁.𐤓̇ · 𐤀𐤁𐤃....
6. 𐤔𐤀𐤄 · 𐤅𐤔𐤅𐤓𐤄 · 𐤅𐤇𐤈𐤄 · 𐤅𐤔𐤏𐤓𐤄 · 𐤅𐤒𐤌 · 𐤐𐤓𐤎 · 𐤁𐤔𐤒𐤋 · 𐤅𐤔𐤈𐤓𐤁.· ...𐤁𐤔𐤒𐤋 · 𐤅𐤀𐤎𐤍𐤁 · 𐤌𐤔𐤕 · 𐤁𐤔𐤒𐤋 · 𐤅𐤉𐤁𐤋 𐤀𐤁𐤉 · 𐤁𐤓̇... · ..
7. 𐤏𐤃 · 𐤌𐤋𐤊 · 𐤀𐤔𐤅𐤓 · 𐤅𐤌𐤋𐤊𐤄 · 𐤏𐤋 · 𐤁𐤉𐤕 · 𐤀𐤁𐤄 · 𐤅𐤄𐤓𐤂 · 𐤀𐤁𐤍̇ · 𐤀𐤁𐤍 · 𐤔𐤇𐤕 · 𐤌𐤍 · 𐤁𐤉𐤕 · 𐤀𐤁𐤄....𐤌𐤍 · 𐤀𐤑𐤓...· 𐤀𐤓𐤒̇ · 𐤉𐤀𐤃𐤉 · 𐤌𐤍 · 𐤁....
8. 𐤅𐤐𐤔𐤔 · 𐤌𐤎𐤂𐤓𐤕 · 𐤅𐤄𐤓𐤐𐤉 · 𐤔𐤁𐤉 · 𐤉𐤀𐤃𐤉 · 𐤅𐤒[𐤌 ·] 𐤀𐤁𐤉 · 𐤅𐤄𐤓𐤐𐤉 · 𐤍𐤔𐤉 · 𐤁𐤎........· ..𐤁𐤀. · 𐤁𐤉𐤕 · 𐤒𐤕𐤉𐤋𐤕 · 𐤅𐤒𐤍𐤅𐤀𐤋..𐤁.. 9. 𐤁𐤉𐤕 · 𐤀𐤁𐤄 · 𐤅𐤄𐤉𐤈𐤁𐤄 · 𐤌𐤍 · 𐤒𐤃𐤌𐤕𐤄 · 𐤅𐤊𐤁𐤓𐤕 · 𐤇𐤈𐤄 · 𐤅𐤔𐤏𐤓𐤄 · 𐤅𐤔𐤀𐤄 · 𐤅𐤔𐤅𐤓𐤄 · 𐤁𐤉𐤅𐤌𐤉𐤄 · 𐤅𐤀𐤆 𐤀𐤊𐤋𐤕 𐤅𐤔̇𐤕̇....
10. 𐤆𐤋𐤕 · 𐤌𐤅𐤊𐤓𐤅 · 𐤅𐤁𐤉𐤅𐤌𐤉 · 𐤀𐤁𐤉 · 𐤐𐤍𐤌𐤅 · 𐤔𐤌 · 𐤌𐤕 · 𐤁𐤏𐤋𐤉 · 𐤊𐤐𐤉𐤓𐤉 · 𐤅𐤁𐤏𐤋𐤉 · 𐤓𐤊𐤁 · 𐤅.𐤇.𐤁 𐤀𐤁𐤉 · 𐤐𐤍𐤌𐤅 · 𐤁𐤌𐤑𐤏𐤕̇ · 𐤌𐤋̇𐤊𐤉 𐤊̇𐤁̇𐤓̇...[𐤀]
11. 𐤁𐤉 · 𐤋𐤅 · 𐤁𐤏𐤋 · 𐤊𐤎𐤐 · 𐤄𐤀 · 𐤅𐤋𐤅 · 𐤁𐤏𐤋 · 𐤆𐤄𐤁 · 𐤁𐤇𐤊𐤌𐤕𐤄 · 𐤅𐤁𐤑𐤃𐤒𐤄 · 𐤐𐤉 · 𐤀𐤇𐤆 · 𐤁𐤊𐤍𐤐 · 𐤌[𐤓]𐤀𐤄 · 𐤌𐤋𐤊 · 𐤀𐤔𐤅𐤓 · 𐤓....
12. 𐤀𐤔𐤅𐤓 · 𐤐𐤇𐤉 · 𐤅𐤀𐤇𐤉 · 𐤉𐤀𐤃𐤉 · 𐤅𐤇𐤍𐤀𐤄 · 𐤌𐤓𐤀𐤄 · 𐤌𐤋𐤊 · 𐤀𐤔𐤅𐤓 · 𐤏𐤋 · 𐤌𐤋𐤊𐤉 · 𐤊𐤁𐤓 𐤁𐤓𐤔.....
13. 𐤁𐤂𐤋𐤂𐤋 · 𐤌𐤓𐤀𐤄 · 𐤕𐤂𐤋𐤕𐤐𐤋𐤎𐤓 · 𐤌𐤋𐤊 · 𐤀𐤔𐤅𐤓 · 𐤌𐤇𐤍𐤕 · 𐤕̇. · 𐤌𐤍 · 𐤌𐤅𐤒𐤀 · 𐤔𐤌𐤔 · 𐤅𐤏̇𐤃 · 𐤌𐤏𐤓𐤁 · 𐤅[𐤌𐤍] · ...
14. 𐤓𐤁𐤏𐤕𐤀𐤓𐤒 · 𐤅𐤁𐤍𐤕 · 𐤌𐤅𐤒𐤀 · 𐤔𐤌𐤔 · 𐤉𐤁𐤋 · 𐤌𐤏𐤓𐤁 · 𐤅𐤁𐤍𐤕 · 𐤌𐤏𐤓𐤁 · 𐤉𐤁𐤋 · 𐤌𐤅[𐤒𐤀 · 𐤔]𐤌𐤔 · 𐤅𐤀𐤁[𐤉....
15. 𐤂𐤁𐤋𐤄 · 𐤌𐤓𐤀𐤄 · 𐤕𐤂𐤋𐤕𐤐𐤋𐤎𐤓 · 𐤌𐤋𐤊 · 𐤀𐤔𐤅𐤓 · 𐤒𐤉𐤓𐤕 · 𐤌𐤍 · 𐤂𐤁𐤋 · 𐤂𐤓𐤂𐤌 · ...𐤅̇𐤉̇.[𐤅𐤀]𐤁𐤉 · 𐤐𐤍𐤌𐤅 · 𐤁𐤓̇ · 𐤁̇[𐤓𐤑𐤓]..
16. 𐤔𐤌𐤓𐤂 · 𐤅𐤂𐤌 · 𐤌𐤕 · 𐤀𐤁𐤉 · 𐤐𐤍𐤌𐤅 · 𐤁𐤋𐤂𐤓𐤉 · 𐤌𐤓𐤀𐤄 · 𐤕𐤂𐤋𐤕𐤐𐤋𐤎𐤓 · 𐤌𐤋𐤊 · 𐤀𐤔𐤅𐤓 · 𐤁𐤌𐤇𐤍𐤕 · 𐤂𐤌....
17. 𐤅𐤁𐤊𐤉𐤄 · 𐤀𐤉𐤇𐤄 · 𐤌𐤋𐤊𐤅 · 𐤅𐤁𐤊𐤉𐤕𐤄 · 𐤌𐤇𐤍𐤕 · 𐤌𐤓𐤀𐤄 · 𐤌𐤋𐤊 · 𐤀𐤔𐤅𐤓 · 𐤊𐤋𐤄 · 𐤅𐤋𐤒𐤇 · 𐤌𐤓𐤀𐤄 · 𐤌𐤋𐤊 · 𐤀𐤔𐤅𐤓...
18. 𐤉 · 𐤍𐤁𐤔𐤄 · 𐤅𐤄𐤒𐤌 · 𐤋𐤄 · 𐤌𐤔𐤕̇𐤉 · 𐤁𐤀𐤓𐤇 · 𐤅𐤄𐤏𐤁𐤓 · 𐤀𐤁𐤉 · 𐤌𐤍 · 𐤃𐤌𐤔𐤒 · 𐤋𐤀𐤔𐤓 · 𐤁𐤉𐤅𐤌𐤉 · 𐤔𐤓....
19. 𐤉𐤄 · 𐤁𐤉𐤕𐤄 · 𐤊𐤋𐤄 · 𐤅𐤀𐤍𐤊𐤉 · 𐤁𐤓𐤊𐤁 · 𐤁𐤓̇ · 𐤐𐤍𐤌[𐤅 · 𐤁𐤑𐤃]𐤒 · 𐤀𐤁𐤉 · 𐤅𐤁𐤑𐤃𐤒𐤉 𐤄𐤅𐤔𐤁𐤍𐤉 · 𐤌𐤓𐤀[𐤉...
20. 𐤀𐤁𐤉 · 𐤐𐤍𐤌𐤅 · 𐤁𐤓 · 𐤁𐤓𐤑𐤓 · 𐤅𐤔𐤌𐤕 · 𐤍𐤑𐤁 · 𐤆𐤍 · .[𐤋𐤀𐤁]𐤉 · 𐤋𐤐𐤍𐤌𐤅 · 𐤁𐤓 · 𐤁𐤓𐤑𐤓 · 𐤅𐤌..𐤕̇ · 𐤁𐤈̇...
21. 𐤅𐤀𐤌𐤓 · 𐤁𐤌𐤔𐤅𐤕 · 𐤅𐤏𐤋 · 𐤉𐤁𐤋 · 𐤀𐤌𐤍 · 𐤉𐤎𐤌̇.. · 𐤌𐤋𐤊 · ..... · 𐤅𐤉𐤁𐤋 · 𐤉𐤅.𐤀 · 𐤒𐤃̇𐤌̇ 𐤒𐤁𐤓 · 𐤀𐤁𐤉 · 𐤐[𐤍𐤌𐤅 ·]...
22. 𐤅𐤆𐤊𐤓 · 𐤆𐤍𐤄 · 𐤄𐤀 · 𐤐𐤀 · 𐤄𐤃𐤃 · 𐤅𐤀𐤋 · 𐤅𐤓𐤊𐤁𐤀𐤋 · 𐤁𐤏𐤋 · 𐤁𐤉𐤕 · 𐤅𐤔𐤌𐤔 · 𐤅𐤊𐤋 · 𐤀𐤋𐤄𐤉 · 𐤉𐤀𐤃𐤉...

23. 𐤉 · 𐤒𐤃𐤌 · 𐤀𐤋𐤄𐤉 · 𐤅𐤒𐤃𐤌 · 𐤀𐤍𐤔 ·

== Bibliography ==
- Halévy, J., "Procès-verbal de la séance générale du 26 juin 1891." JA ser. 8, vol. 18 (1891): 5–9.
- Sachau, E., "Zur historischen Geographie von Nordsyrien." SPAW 21 (1892): 313–38
- Belger, C., "Sendschirli II." Berliner philologische Wochenschrift 13 (1893): 355–56, 385-88
- Derenbourg, H., "Pînamou, fils de Karîl." REJ 26 (1893): 135–38
- Halévy, J., "Deux inscriptions sémitiques de Zindjîrlî." RevSém 1 (1893): 77–90
- Luschan, F. von, "Fünf Bildwerke aus Gerdschin." Pp. In Ausgrabungen in Sendschirli, I., Berlin: W. Spemann, 1893
- Müller, D.H., "Die altsemitischen Inschriften von Sendschirli." WZKM 7 (1893): 33–70, 113-40
- Šanda, A., "Zur Panammu-Inschrift Zeile 16." BZ 2 (1904): 369. Pan
