= Kuttamuwa stele =

Ancient Turkish funerary stele

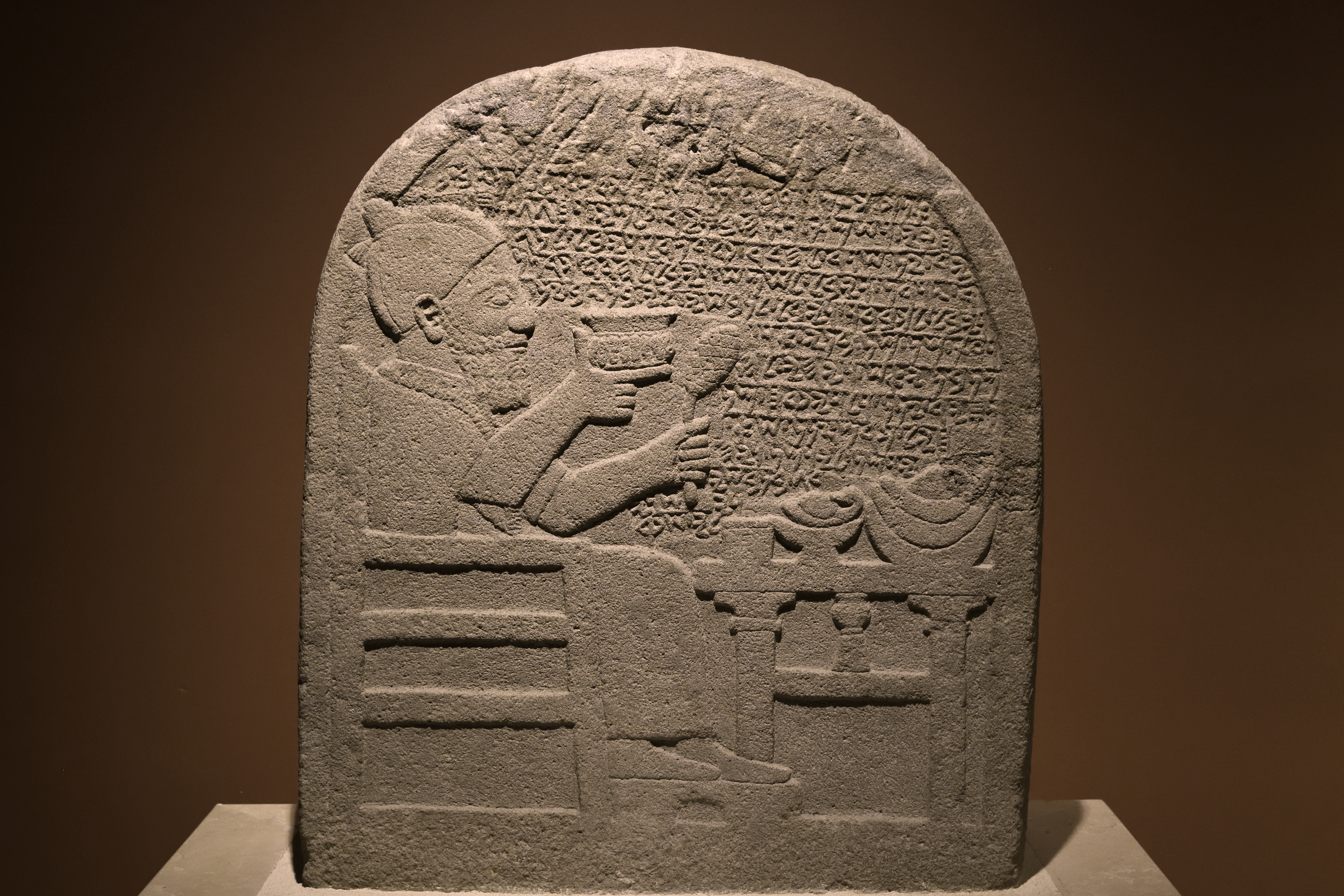
- The Kuttamuwa stele in the Gaziantep Museum of Archaeology
- Material: Basalt
- Size: 3 ft × 2 ft (0.91 m × 0.61 m)
- Weight: 800 lb (360 kg)
- Writing: Phoenician
- Created: 8th century BCE
- Period/culture: Iron Age
- Discovered: 2008; Samʾal

The Kuttamuwa stele is an 800-pound (360 kg) basalt funerary stele with an Aramaic inscription referring to Kuttamuwa, an 8th-century BCE royal official. It was found in Samʾal, in southeastern Turkey, in 2008, by the Neubauer Expedition of the Institute for the Study of Ancient Cultures at the University of Chicago.

== Description ==
The stele measures three feet (0.91 m) tall and two feet (0.61 m) wide. It was a stele for Kuttamuwa, an 8th-century BCE royal official from Samʾal who ordered an inscribed stele, that was to be erected upon his death.

== Inscription ==
The inscription requested that his mourners commemorate his life and his afterlife with feasts "for my soul that is in this stele." It is one of the earliest references in a Near East culture to a soul as a separate entity from the body.

The translation of the stele:

I am KTMW (Kuttamuwa), servant of Panamuwa, who commissioned for myself (this) stele while still living. I placed it in an eternal chamber and established a feast (at) this chamber: a bull for Hadad Qarpatalli, a ram for NGD/R ṢWD/RN, a ram for Šamš, a ram for Hadad of the Vineyards, a ram for Kubaba, and a ram for my "soul" (NBŠ) that (will be) in this stele. Henceforth, whoever of my sons or of the sons of anybody (else) should come into possession of this chamber, let him take from the best (produce) of this vine(yard) (as) a (presentation)-offering year by year. He is also to perform the slaughter (prescribed above) in (proximity to) my “soul” and is to apportion for me a leg-cut.

== Text ==
	Pardee (2009) Transcription
𐤀𐤍𐤊 . 𐤊𐤕𐤌𐤅 . 𐤏𐤁𐤃 [.] 𐤐𐤍𐤌𐤅. [𐤆𐤉] . 𐤒𐤍𐤕 . 𐤋[𐤉] . 𐤍𐤑𐤁 . 𐤁 𐤇𐤉𐤉 . 𐤅𐤔𐤌𐤕 . 𐤅𐤕𐤄 . 𐤁𐤎𐤉𐤓\𐤃 . 𐤏𐤋𐤌𐤉 . 𐤅𐤇𐤂𐤂𐤕 . 𐤎 𐤉𐤓\𐤃 . 𐤆𐤍 . 𐤔𐤅𐤓 . 𐤋𐤄𐤃𐤃 . 𐤒𐤓\𐤃𐤐𐤃\𐤓𐤋 . 𐤅𐤉𐤁𐤋 . 𐤋𐤍𐤂 𐤃\𐤓 . 𐤑𐤅𐤃\𐤓𐤍 . 𐤅𐤉𐤁𐤋 . 𐤋𐤔𐤌𐤔 . 𐤅𐤉𐤁𐤋 . 𐤋𐤄𐤃𐤃 . 𐤊𐤓𐤌𐤍 𐤅𐤉𐤁𐤋 . 𐤋𐤊𐤁𐤁𐤅 . 𐤅𐤉𐤁𐤋 . 𐤋𐤍𐤁𐤔𐤉 . 𐤆𐤉 . 𐤁𐤍𐤑𐤁 . 𐤆𐤍 . 𐤅𐤏𐤕 . 𐤌𐤍 . 𐤌𐤍 . 𐤁𐤍𐤉 . 𐤀𐤅 . 𐤌𐤍 𐤁𐤍𐤉 𐤀𐤔 . 𐤅𐤉𐤄𐤉 . 𐤋𐤄 . 𐤍𐤎𐤉𐤓\𐤃 . 𐤆𐤍𐤍 . 𐤅𐤋𐤅 𐤉𐤒𐤇 . 𐤌𐤍 𐤇𐤉𐤋 . 𐤊𐤓𐤌 . 𐤆𐤍𐤍 . 𐤔𐤀 . 𐤉𐤅𐤌𐤍 . 𐤋𐤉𐤅𐤌𐤍 . 𐤅𐤉𐤄 𐤓𐤂 . 𐤁𐤍𐤁𐤔𐤉 . 𐤅𐤉𐤔𐤅𐤉 𐤋𐤉. 𐤔𐤒	ʾnk . ktmw . ʿbd [.] pnmw . [zy] . qnt . l[y] . nṣb . b ḥyy . wšmt . wth . bsyr/d . ʿlmy . wḥggt . s yr/d . zn . šwr . lhdd . qr/dpd/rl . wybl . lng d/r . ṣwd/rn . wybl . lšmš . wybl . lhdd . krmn wybl . lkbbw . wybl . lnbšy . zy . bnṣb . zn . wʿt . mn . mn . bny . ʾw . mn bny ʾš . wyhy . lh . nsyr/d . znn . wlw yqḥ . mn ḥyl . krm . znn . šʾ . ywmn . lywmn . wyh rg . bnbšy wyšwy ly . šq

== Bibliography ==
- Herrman, Virginia & Schloen, J. David, In Remembrance of Me: Featings with the Dead in the Ancient Middle East, The Oriental Institute of the University of Chicago 37, 2014 PDF
- Schloen, J., & Fink, A. (2009). New Excavations at Zincirli Höyük in Turkey (Ancient Samʾal) and the Discovery of an Inscribed Mortuary Stele. Bulletin of the American Schools of Oriental Research, (356), 1-13. Retrieved September 16, 2020
- Pardee, Dennis (2009). "A New Aramaic Inscription from Zincirli." Bulletin of the American Schools of Oriental Research, (356), 51–71.
