= Samʾal =

Archaeological site in Turkey

Zincirli Höyük
- Sam'al
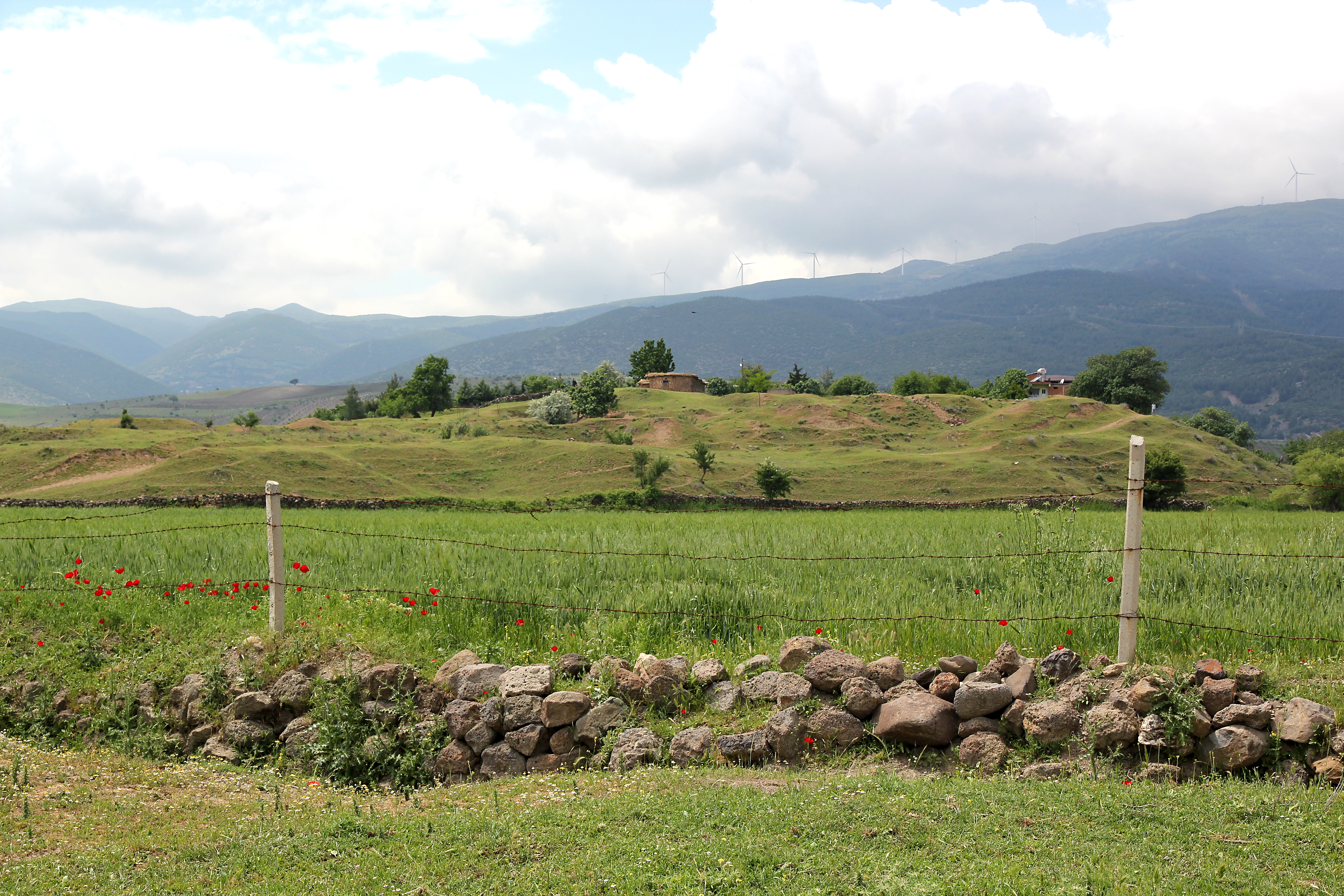
- Archeological site of Sam'al

- Location within Turkey
- 37°06′13″N 36°40′43″E
- Type: Settlement
- Location: Gaziantep Province, Turkey

Site notes
- Length: 40 ha
- Excavation dates: 1888, 1890, 1891, 1894, 1902, 2006-2017
- Archaeologists: Felix von Luschan, Robert Koldewey, David Schloen, Virginia Herrmann
- Condition: In ruins

Zincirli Höyük is an archaeological site located in the Anti-Taurus Mountains of modern Turkey's Gaziantep Province. During its time under the control of the Neo-Assyrian Empire (c. 700 BC) it was called, by them, Sam'al. It was founded at least as far back as the Early Bronze Age and thrived between 3000 and 2000 BC, and on the highest part of the upper mound was found a walled citadel of the Middle Bronze Age (ca. 2000–1600 BC).

== Location ==
Zinjirli Höyük is located at the northern end of the Kara Su river valley. The site is situated on the western side of the valley at the base of the Amanus Mountains, and measures approximately 40 ha in area. Its location was on the overland route that connected Carchemish to the fertile Cilician plain and further on west to Anatolia.

The city was protected by a double, almost circular wall with a diameter of 720 to 800 meters. Each of the two walls, made of air-dried clay bricks, was over three meters thick with the distance between them being seven meters. The walls had around 100 guard towers around, and three entrances. The residential area was located within the city walls.

On the citadel of Samal there were several palaces of Bit-hilani type, i.e. with an entrance decorated with wooden columns and a transverse main room. The citadel also contained palaces from the Assyrian period, and warehouses.

== History ==
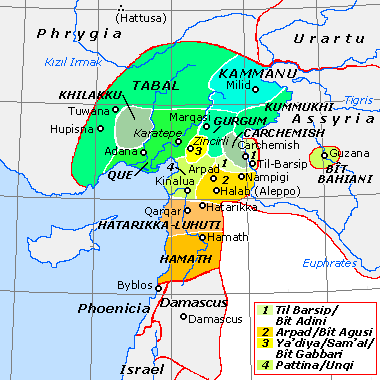
Historical map of the Neo-Hittite states, c. 800 BC, showing the location of Sam'al at modern Zincirli (3).

=== Early Bronze Age ===
The site of Sam'al was occupied in the Early Bronze Age III/IV (c. 2700–2100 BC).

It may be speculated if the site was a trade center on the Anatolian Trade Network, bringing metals from Anatolia into the Near East.

=== Middle Bronze Age ===
==== Middle Bronze II ====
At least from c.1700 to 1650 BC Zincirli Höyük was a trading hub with the production of wine transported in a specific type of vessel, the globular flask, being part of the trade centered in the nearby ancient Syrian region of Mamma. Zincirli is located only 9 km north of Tilmen Höyük, possibly the capital of the Zalpa/Zalwar kingdom, which eventually became one of the twenty vassal small states of the Yamhad kingdom based on Aleppo.

New excavations revealed a monumental complex in the Middle Bronze Age II (ca. 1800–1700 BC), and another structure (Complex DD) that was destroyed in the mid to late 17th century BC, maybe by Hititte king Hattusili I. This event was recently radiocarbon-dated to sometime between 1632 and 1610 BC, during the late Middle Bronze Age II (ca. 1700–1600 BC).

Excavations by Chicago-Tubingen Expedition revealed that the bit-hilani palace of Hilani I in Zincirli (believed by the early German excavators to be from Iron Age Sam'al period) was actually a large broadroom temple from Middle Bronze Age II, lasting roughly from 1800 to 1650 BC, destroyed in mid- to late 17th century BC based on 10 radiocarbon dates. Additional samples later produced a radiocarbon date of c. 1632–1610 BC for the destruction. The archaeological site of Zincirli was not abandoned after Hattusili I's sack sometime around 1632 to 1610 BC, as there is recent evidence of Hittite occupation during the Late Bronze Age.

In 2020, the nearby site of Tilmen Höyük was "convincingly identified" with the ancient 'Zalpa' in the Annals of Ḫattušili I. There is also another ancient town of Zalpa, located at Zalpuwa to the north of Ḫattuša near the Black Sea. That northern Zalpa was mentioned in the Hittite "Queen of Kanesh" myth. Scholars were formerly unsure about the location of 'Zalpa' that Hattusili I destroyed, and thought it was in the north.

=== Late Bronze ===
The site was thought to have been abandoned during the Hittite and Mitanni periods, but excavations in 2021 season showed evidence of occupation during the Late Bronze Age in Hittite times (ca. 1600–1180 BC).

=== Iron Age ===
The Iron Age II town of Zincirli was founded about 900 BC, according to the inscription of Kilamuwa. The name of Gabbar suggests that he was an Aramaean chieftain seizing power in the predominantly Luwian area.

The area flourished in the Iron Age (Iron IIA period), initially under Luwian-speaking Neo-Hittites, and the city soon had become a kingdom. In the 9th and 8th century BC it came under control of the Neo-Assyrian Empire and by the 7th century BC had become a directly ruled Assyrian province.

==== Aramean kingdom ====
The Aramean kingdom flourished here from the early 900s to 713 BC, with its capital at Zinjirli. Its native Samalian language name was Yādiya or Ya'diya. The Assyrians knew it as Sam'al, and in Aramaic it was known as Ya'udi, or Yaudi. This was a middle power of the Middle-East in the early first millennium BC.

A dynasty of eleven Aramean kings ruled this city state, that was formerly Luwian. Its location was near the Nur Mountains. The monumental inscription of Kilamuwa, the fifth king of the dynasty, is the earliest inscription that provides us with historical information. Four more of these kings have also left inscriptions later. These are the main sources for historical data about this time period.

The Aramean dynasty founder was king Gabbar, dated around 900 BC. Royal steles and stone tablets from the period of Panamuwa II are also important.

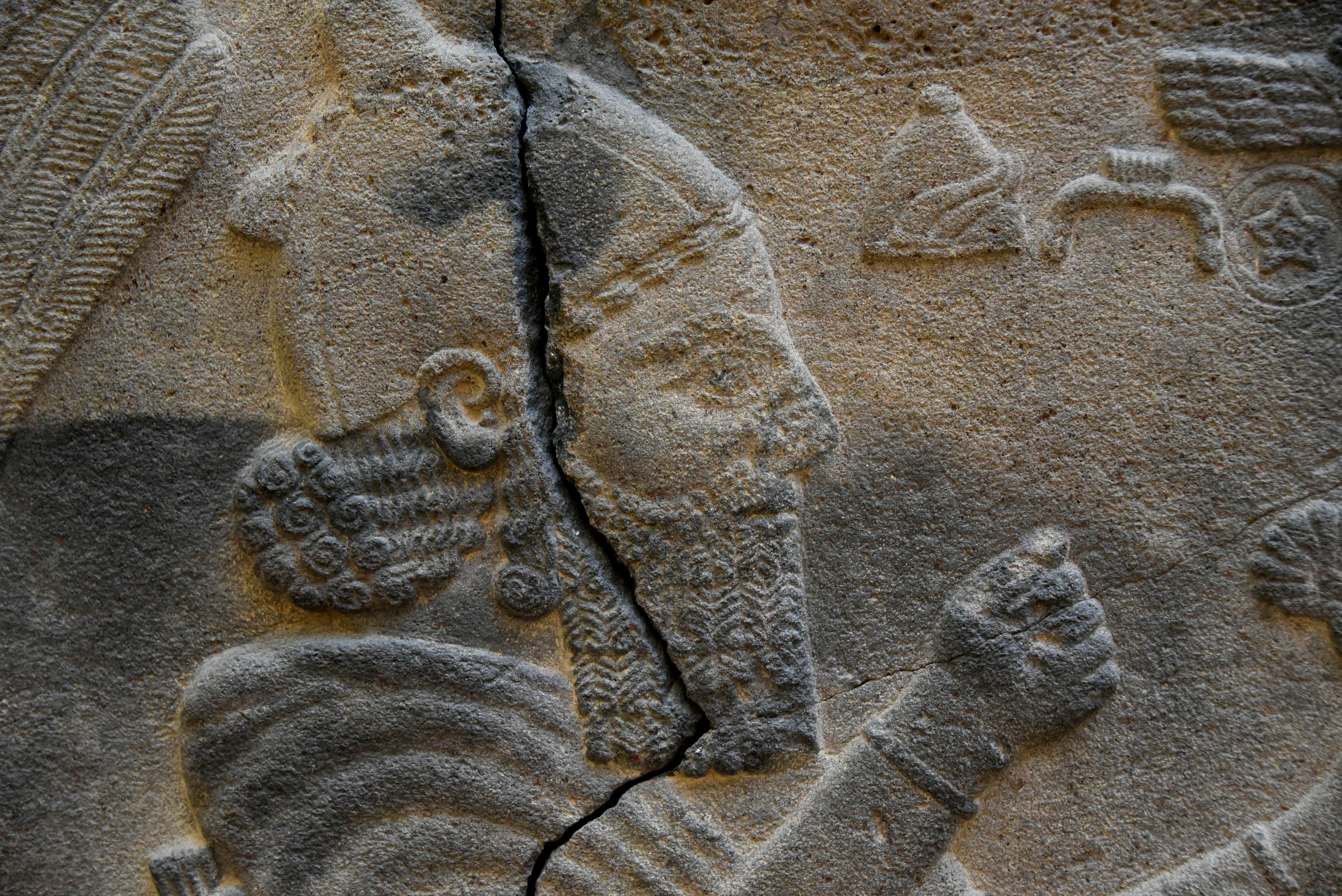
Inscription of King Barrekub

Also the Kilamuwa scepter has been found here in 1943. It is a small gold object inscribed in a similar old type of Phoenician alphabet.

The kingdom became a middle power at the end of the 10th century BC. It had expanded from being a city state and gained territories from Carchemish, around Adana from Quwê and remained independent. It didn't become part of Cilicia.

==== Assyrian expansion ====
In 859 BC, Shalmaneser III moved westward with his army to Lutibu in Sam’al, where he fought a hostile coalition of kings including a ruler of Sam’al named Hayyanu, as well as Sapalulme of Patina (also known as Suppiluliuma (Pattin)). And soon after, there was also a battle near Alimus (Aliṣir/Alimush), the fortified city of the same Sapalulme the Patinean, where Shalmaneser again fought an anti-Assyrian coalition. Again, kings from Sam’al, Patina, Bit-Adini, Karkemiš, and others were members of this coalition. Shalmaneser defeated them. Hayyanu, king of Sam'al was again taking part, and later he was forced to pay tribute to Shalmaneser at the city of Dabigu along with others of these kings.

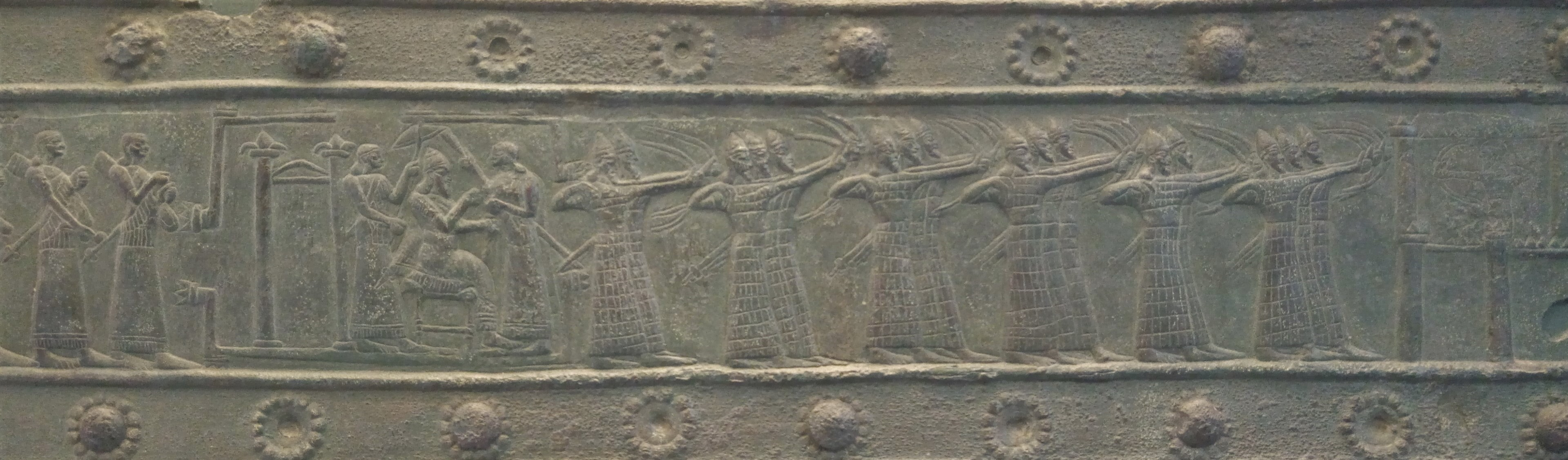
Bronze relief from the Balawat Gates: Shalmaneser watching the storming of Dabigu, Northern Syria, 858 BC. L. W. King, Bronze reliefs from the gates of Shalmaneser, King of Assyria, B.C. 860-825, London, 1915, plates XX-XXI Band IV.2 et 3

Hayyanu didn't participate in the Battle of Qarqar in 853 BC, and instead paid tribute to Shalmaneser III. This battle was fought to the south in Syria around Hama. So Assyria did not pursue then its expansion to the Western areas.

The campaign of Assyria in 825 BC occupied the vital territories of Sam'al, Quwê had been defeated, but it had been reorganised as Denyen. After the death of Shalmaneser III, Ya'udi again became independent.

Some rulers of Sam'al had aggressive expansionist politics; others acceded to one of the anti-Assyrian Syrian coalition. Assyrian sources are not clear regarding Sam'al. Ya'udi was one of Assyria's satellite states in the annals of Shalmaneser III. Though around 830 BC Azitawadda, king of Denyen, states Ya'udi is his satellite country – at the same time, Kilamuwa mentions on his stela that he hired Assyria against Denyen.

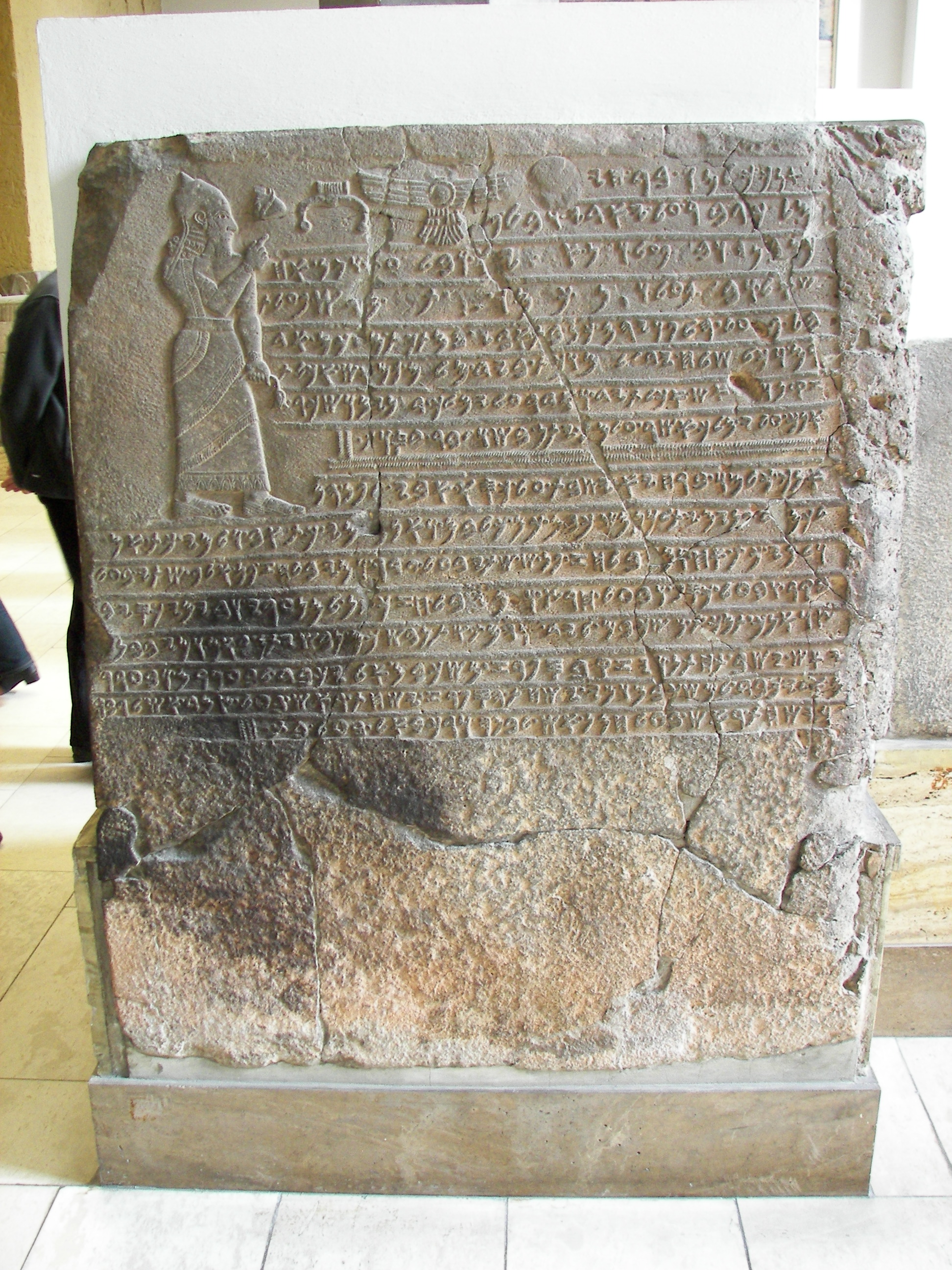
Kilamuwa Stela: an inscription of Prince Kilamuwa of Samal, Pergamon Museum

Other sources from the same period mention Ya'udi as a satellite state of Denyen and Assyria wanted to occupy this territory. Kilamuva might offer for Deyen to be a satellite state. Before this, he should defeat his greatest foe, Azitawadda. Assyrians won over Denyen and Sam'al in 825 BC. Sam'al became independent after the death of Shalmaneser III.

There is an alternative opinion which states that Ya'udi and Sam'al were originally separate royal houses. Indeed, the List of Neo-Hittite kings attests Y'adiya/Ya'udi and Sam'al as two separate royal houses, Ya'udi being the older of the two.

Gabar, the founder of Ya'udi, and his successors became a member of the Assyrian satellites.

The Kingdom of Sam'al was founded by Hayyanu and his successor was Ahabbu of Siri'laya (Zincirli) in 854 BC.

This makes clear why Shalmaneser III lists Ya'udi (Bit-Gabbari) but not Sam'al as a satellite state. The Kingdom of Ya'udi wanted to open a corridor between Assyria and Denyen. It was prevented by the unified Syrian forces. This unity had been dissolved in 825 BC.

After the death of Shalmanezer III Denyen couldn't occupy Ya'udi but the Samalians could. Sam'al annexed Ya'udi and moved into the palace of Kilamuva.

Sam’al’s friendly relationship with the Assyrian Empire probably started during Shalmaneser’s reign and continued into the early years of Šamši-Adad V (824-811 BC). This brought prosperity to the kingdom by providing access to the huge volume of the imperial trade. Big construction projects are also dated to this period.

At the end, in 717 BC, Assyria occupied the country under the rule of Sargon II.

== Archaeology ==
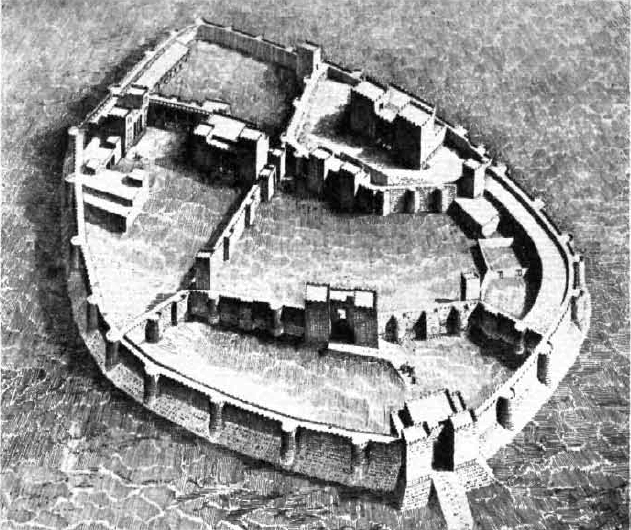
Reconstruction of the citadel

The site covers an area of about 40 hectares. It was visited by archaeologist Osman Hamdi Bey in 1882. In 1883 three German travelers collected and took photographs there. At that time orthostats were still visible at the surface. It was excavated in 1888, 1890, 1891, 1894 and 1902 during expeditions led by Felix von Luschan and Robert Koldewey. Each of the expeditions was supported by the German Orient Committee, except for the fourth (1894), which was financed with monies from the Rudolf-Virchow-Stiftung and private donors. They found a walled heavily fortified teardrop-shaped citadel accessed by the outer citadel gate, which was surrounded by the as yet unexcavated town and a further enormous 2.5 kilometer long double fortification wall with three gates (most notably the southern city gate) and 100 bastions. Finds from the excavations are held in the Vorderasiatisches Museum Berlin and the Istanbul Archaeology Museum. The Louvre holds a carved orthostat and two sphinx protomes and some minor sculptures are held at museums in Adana and Gaziantep. During the 1902 excavation at Zincirli Höyük the Kilamuwa Stela (Zincirli 65), a 9th-century BC stele of King Kilamuwa (c. 840–810 BC) in Phoenician language was found at the entrance to Building J. It is written in an Old Aramaic form of the Phoenician alphabet.

At the foundation of Gate E of the inner citadel five basalt lion statues were found buried in a pit that ranged as deep as 4.2 meters. The date of the pit is unclear, though the excavators suggested the Middle Bronze age. The statues are in two different styles which the excavators placed as being from the late 10th century BC (Zincirli I) and c. 700 BC (Zincirli IV). These became known as the Sam'al lions.

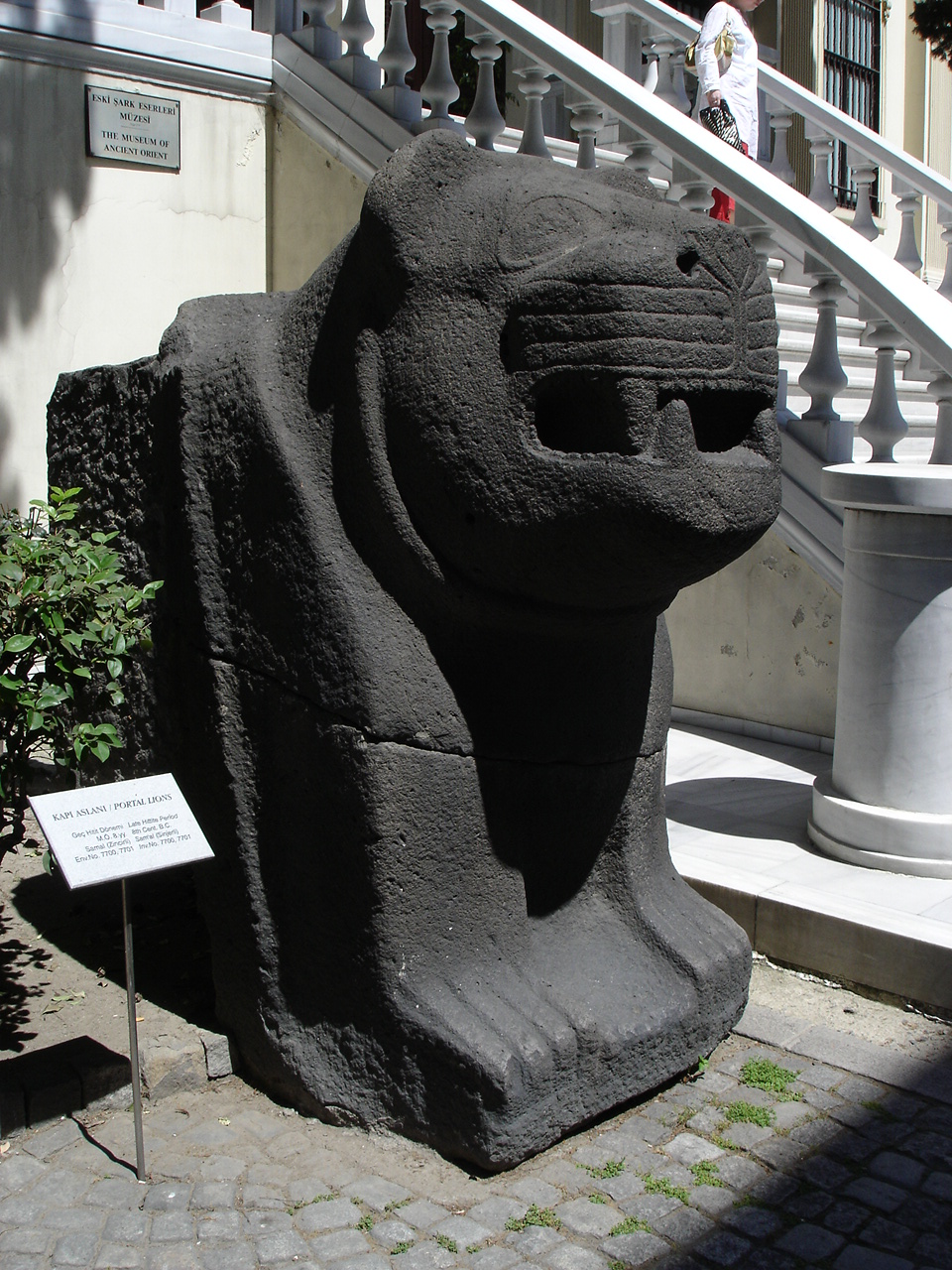
A lion at the Istanbul Archaeology Museum

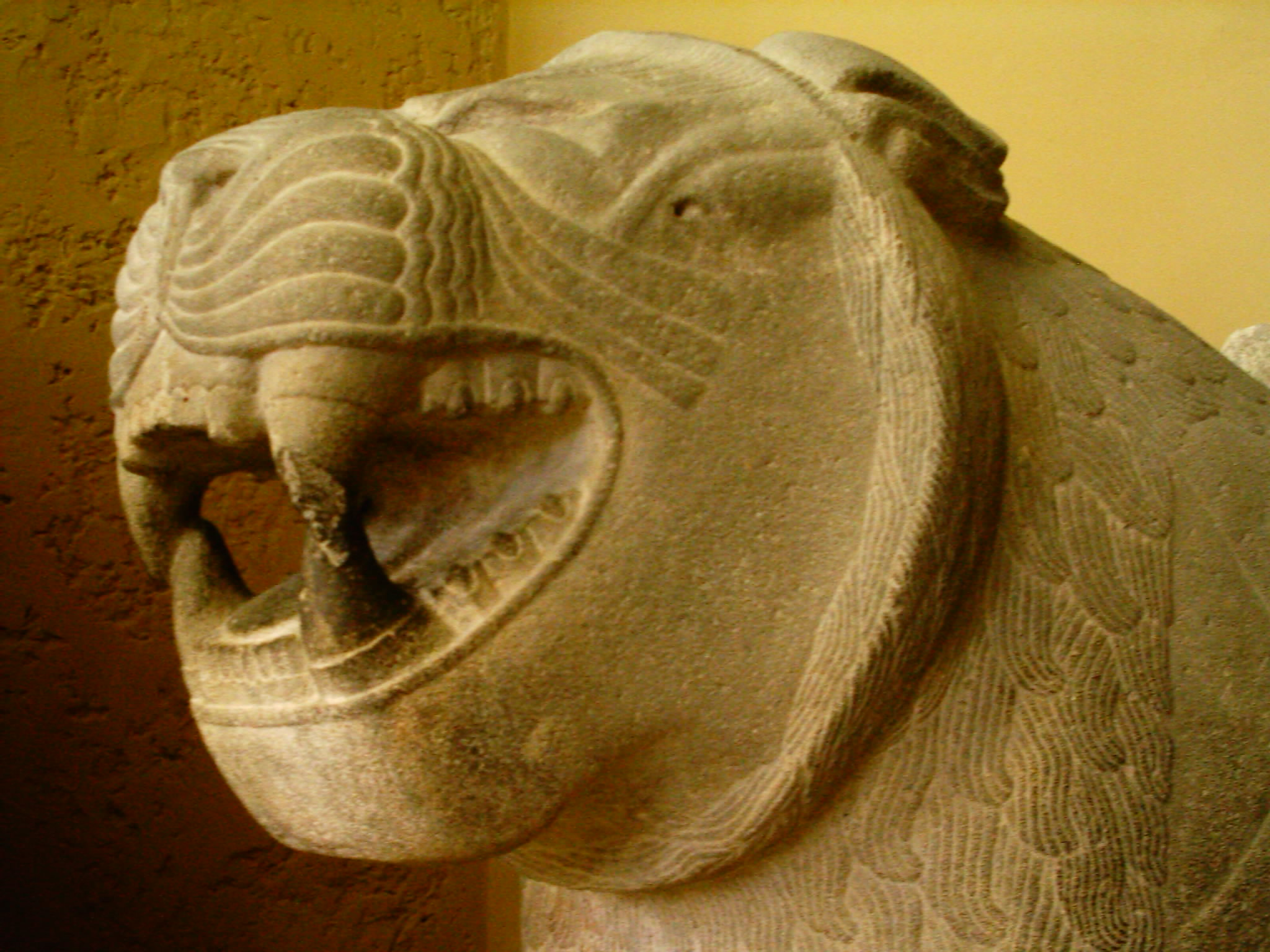
A lion of Samal, now in the Pergamon Museum

There were five excavation reports:

- Volume 1: Felix von Luschan et al, "Ausgrabungen in Sendschirli: Einleitung und Inschriften", Spemann, 1893
- Volume 2: Felix von Luschan and Carl Humann and Robert Koldewey, "Ausgrabungen in Sendschirli: Ausgrabungsbericht und Architektur", Spemann, 1898
- Volume 3: Felix von Luschan, "Ausgrabungen in Sendschirli: Thorsculpturen", Georg Reimer, 1902
- Volume 4: Felix von Luschan and Gustav Jacoby, "Ausgrabungen in Sendschirli", Georg Reimer, 1911
- Volume 5: Felix von Luschan and Walter Andrae, "Ausgrabungen in Sendschirli: Die Kleinfunde von Sendschirli", Walter de Gruyter, 1943

The field diaries of the excavation were lost during World War II.

In August 2006, the Oriental Institute of the University of Chicago together with the Institute for Ancient Near Eastern Studies of the University of Tübingen began a new long-term excavation project at the site of Zincirli under the directorship of David Schloen and Virginia Herrmann. Eleven seasons of excavation were conducted ending in 2017. Finds included the Kuttamuwa stele, in the Samalian variant of Aramaic and dated c. 740 BC. A destroyed Middle Bronze Age II building was found at Area 2 on the eastern citadel. it is nearby and on the same stratigraphic level as the bit-hilani palace located by early excavators. That palace was present only in its stone foundations as the area was clear for construction of the Neo-Assyrian governors residence (Palace G) of the 7th century BC. With the redating of the bit-hilani structure there is not a complete lack of monumental construction in Iron Age II until the time of Kilamuwa.

== Inscriptions found in the area ==
Multiple important historical inscriptions have been found in this area. They include at least seven inscriptions, as listed at the link above, including the Kuttamuwa stele found in 2008.

The German excavations on the citadel recovered large numbers of relief-carved orthostats, along with inscriptions in Aramaic, Phoenician, and Akkadian. These are on exhibit in the Pergamon Museum, Berlin, and Istanbul. Also found was the notable Victory stele of Neo-Assyrian ruler Esarhaddon celebrating his victory over Egyptian pharaoh Taharqa in 671 BC.

Three royal inscriptions from Ya'udi or Sam'al are particularly informative for the history of the area. The earliest is from the reign of King Panammu I, the others later at 730 BC. Their language is known as Samalian or Ya'udic. Some scholars including P.-E. Dion and S. Moscati have advanced Samalian as a distinct variety of Old Aramaic. Attempts to establish a rigorous definition of "Aramaic" have led to a conclusion of Samalian as distinct from Aramaic, despite some shared features.

=== Pancarli Hoyuk inscription ===
The site of Pancarli Hoyuk is located about 1 km southeast of Zincirli. A new hieroglyphic Luwian inscription has been discovered here in 2006, and published in 2016. It bears 3 fragmented lines of hieroglyphic Luwian text.

The inscription is fragmentary, but nevertheless it appears to be of a royal character. Previously, all known inscriptions from this area were exclusively written in Northwest Semitic languages. According to the authors, the most probable conclusion is that PANCARLI inscription represents a ruler or a local king of the tenth or early ninth century BC.

This inscription provides new information about the Early Iron Age of the Islahiye valley, and the history of the Aramaean dynasty of Gabbar.

If the inscription is considered to date to the 10th century BC, it may be the first solid evidence for a Luwian-speaking kingdom in the Islahiye valley, as possibly an offshoot of the Hittite rump-state at Karkemish.

== Gallery ==
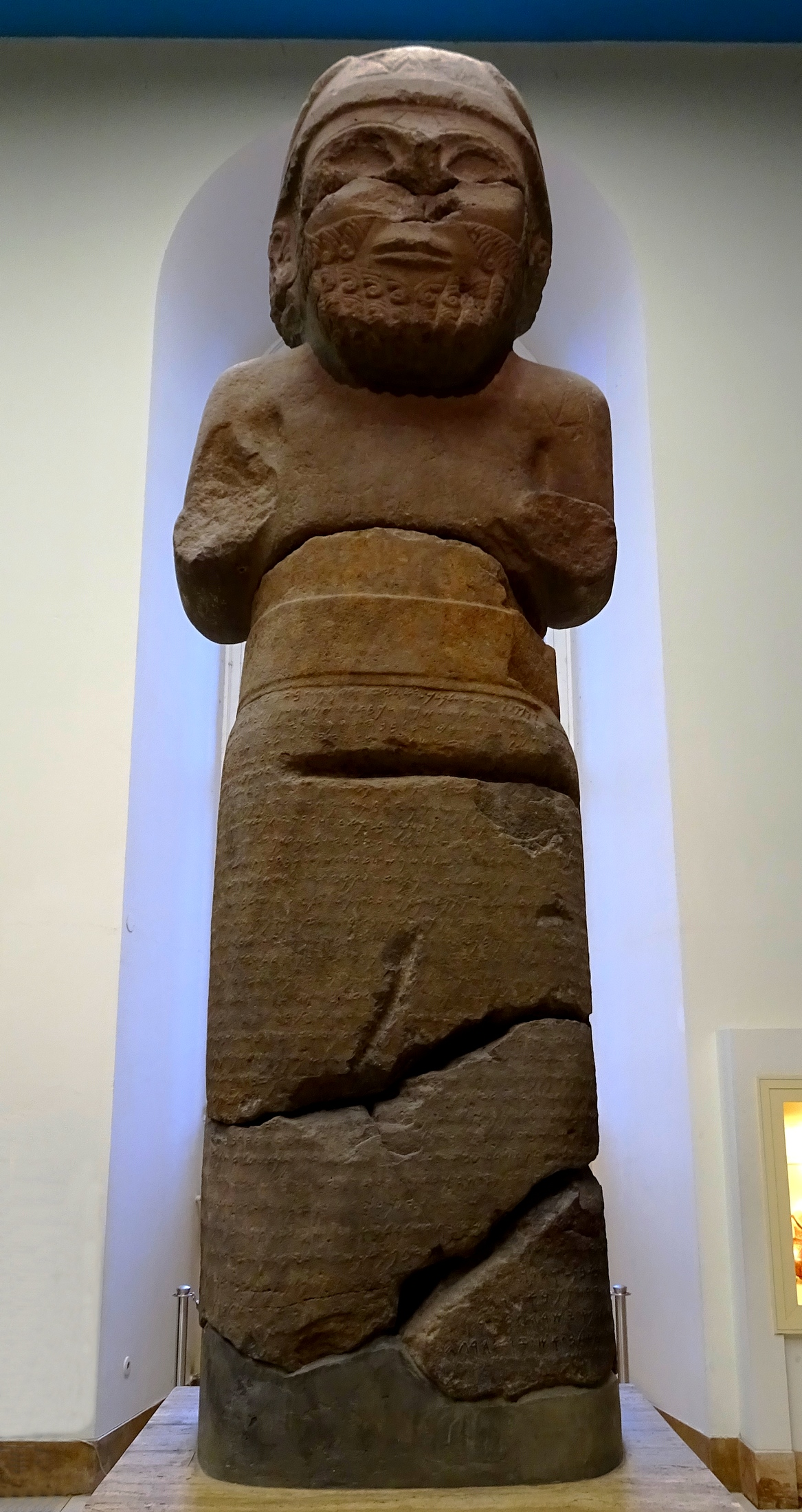
Hadad Statue with inscription (KAI 214), Pergamon Museum

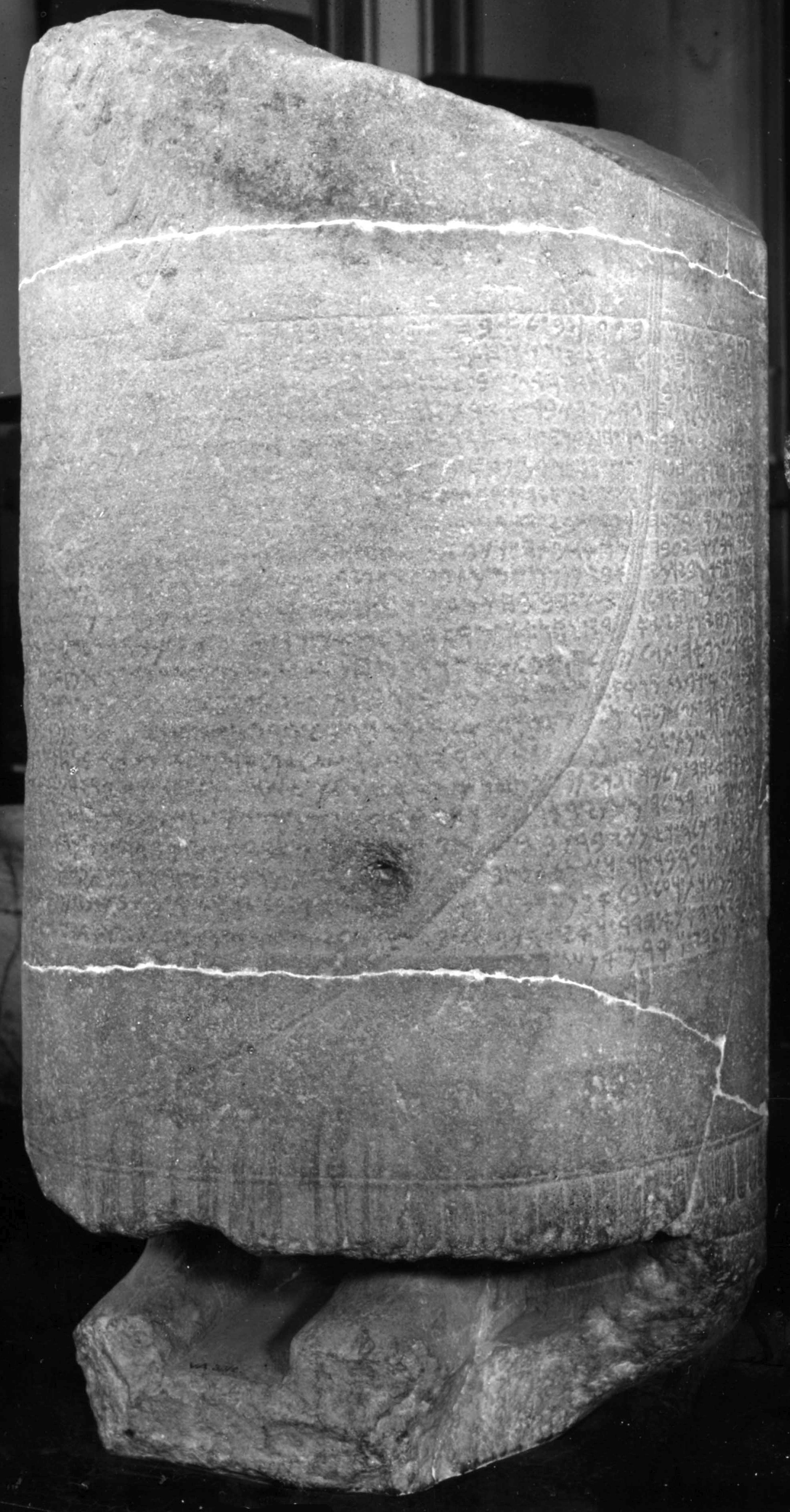
Panamuwa II inscription (KAI 215)

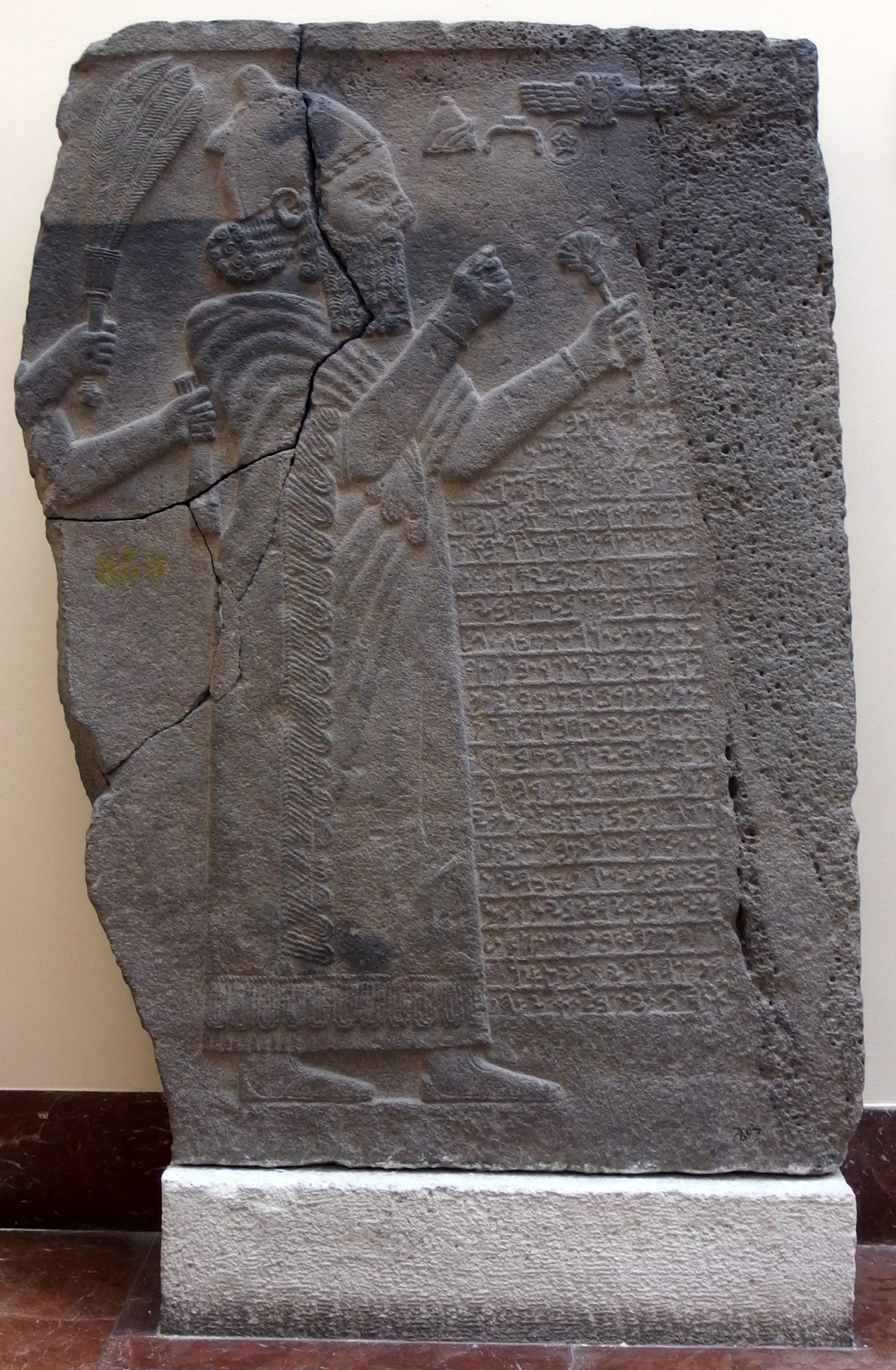
Bar-Rakib stele I (KAI 216), Istanbul Museum

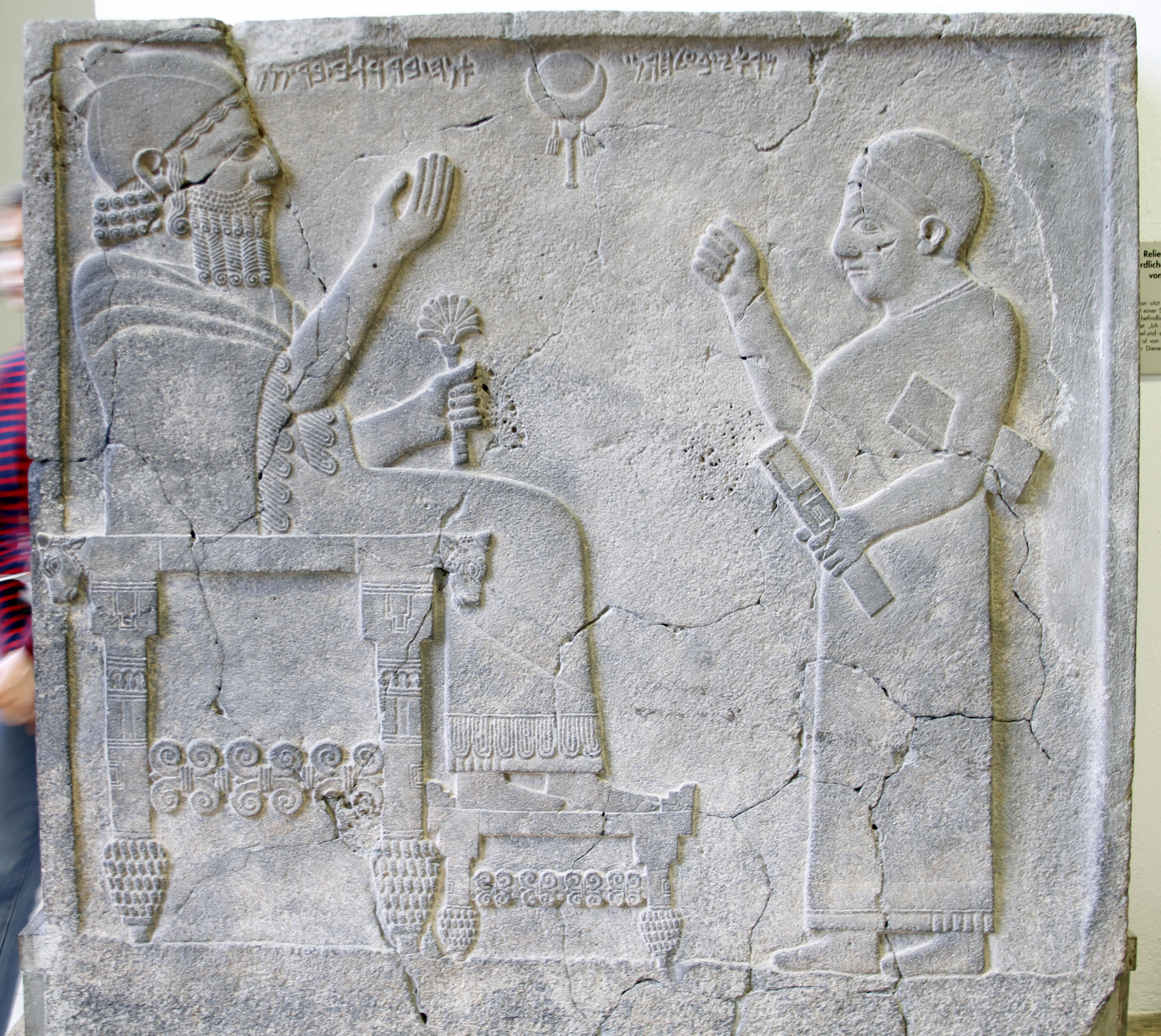
Bar-Rakib stele III (KAI 218), Pergamon Museum

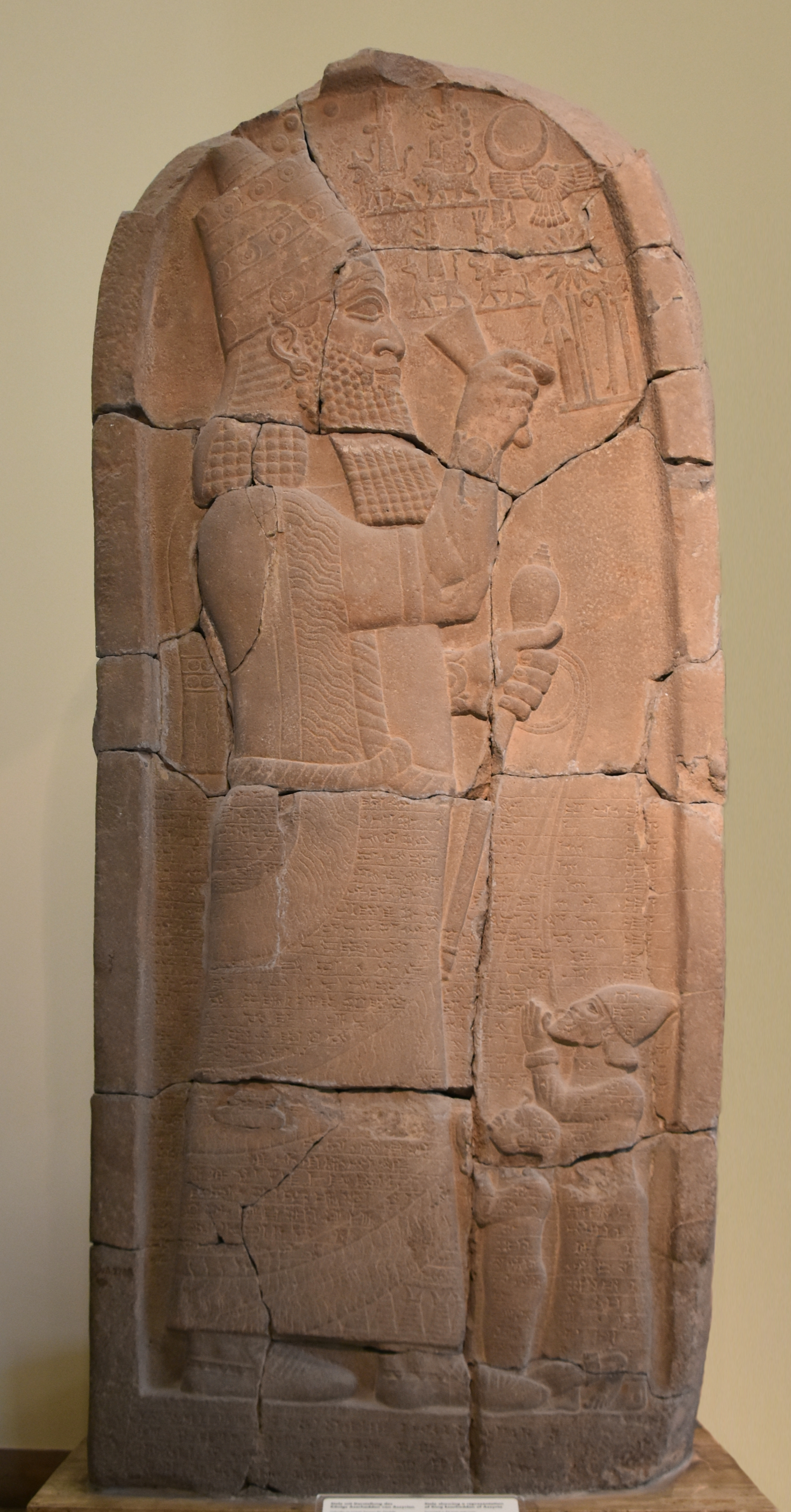
Victory stele of Esarhaddon

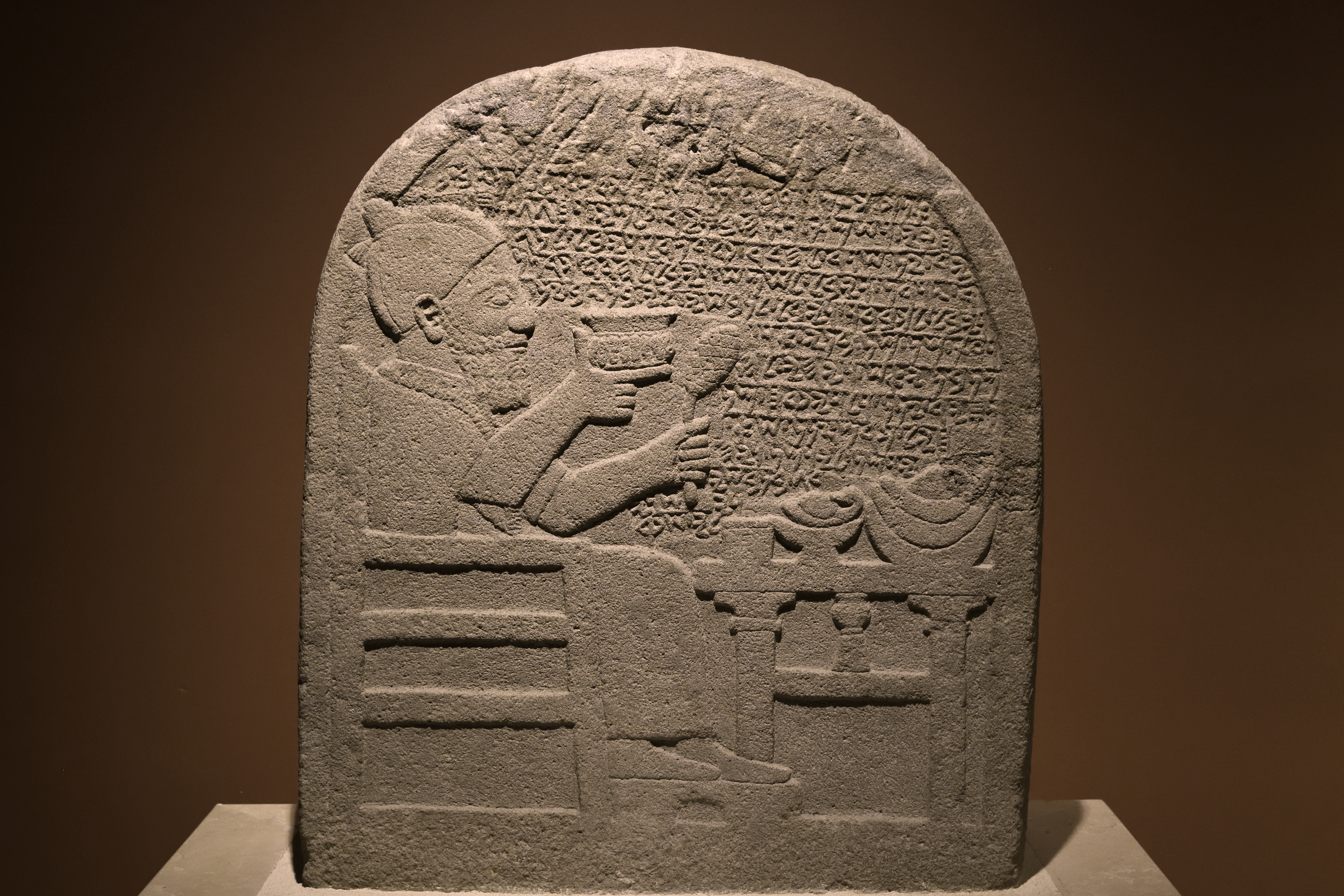
Kuttamuwa stele

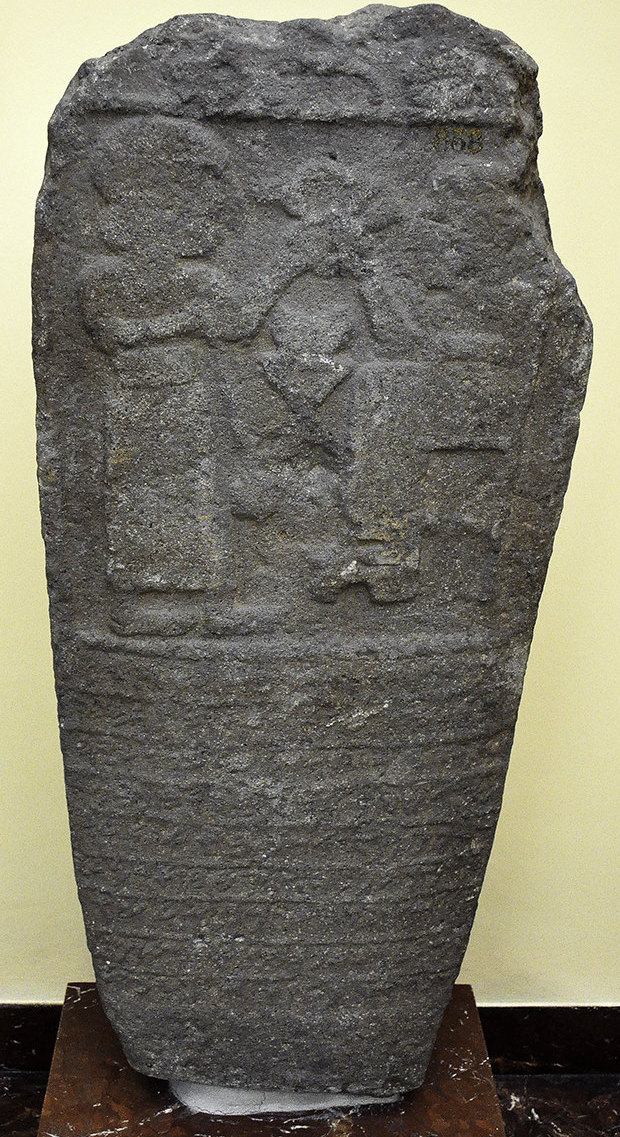
Stele of Ördek-Burnu in the Istanbul Museum of the Ancient Orient

== See also ==
- Cities of the ancient Near East
- Short chronology timeline
- Euphrates Syrian Pillar Figurines
- Euphrates Handmade Syrian Horses and Riders
