= Thrones of Astarte =

Phoenician votive thrones

Places associated with the Thrones of Astarte

The Thrones of Astarte are approximately a dozen ex-voto "cherubim" thrones found in ancient Phoenician temples in Lebanon, in particular in areas around Sidon, Tyre and Umm al-Amad. Many of the thrones are similarly styled, flanked by cherubim-headed winged lions on either side. Images of the thrones are found in Phoenician sites around the Mediterranean, including an ivory plaque from Tel Megiddo (Israel), a relief from Hadrumetum (Tunisia) and a scarab from Tharros (Italy).

Two of the thrones bear inscriptions – one published by Ronzevalle in 1907, and a second published by Lemaire in 2014.

== List of Thrones ==
Image	Period	Location found	Current location	Inscription	Description	First published
	Hellenistic	Byblos	National Museum of Beirut	none	On the front, two figures pouring a libation into a flower. On the seat, rectangular anathyrosis for placing an object.	Dunand
	Hellenistic	Sidon	National Museum of Beirut	none	On the front, a Phoenician palmette. On the seat, a large rectangular mortise used to fix an object. Backrest without decoration.	1941 Dunand
	Roman	Sidon	National Museum of Beirut	Greek inscription	Seat very tilted, unable to hold an object. The back shows a globe inside a crescent.	1924
		Sidon	Louvre	none	Naiskos in which is a throne with two sphinxes. Above the seat, U-shaped cavity, intended to receive an object rounded at the bottom: perhaps a round baetyl and its crowns. On the side faces, officiating priests.	1933
		Sidon	Istanbul Archaeology Museums	none	Naiskos analogous to the previous one. At the back is a small cavity, intended to hold an object. On the sides, winged goddesses of Egyptian style.	
	2nd century BCE	Khirbet et-Tayibeh, near Ras al-Ain near Tyre	Louvre	Phoenician dedication to Astarte, known as KAI 17	On the throne, two stelae with reliefs, depicting two standing officiants.	1907 Ronzevalle
	Hellenistic	Ain Baal near Tyre	National Museum of Beirut	none	Seat contains a stele or baetyl	
	Hellenistic	Region of Tyre	National Museum of Beirut	none	Seat contains a stele or baetyl	
	4th century BCE	Umm al-Amad	Louvre	none	On the front, a Phoenician palmette	1860, Renan
		Umm al-Amad	National Museum of Beirut	none	The front is broken. Horizontal seat, rounded front. Backrest without decoration. Large throne which could fit a person.	Dunand
		Temple of Eshmun	Temple of Eshmun	none		Dunand
		Temple of Eshmun	National Museum of Beirut	none		Dunand
	Hellenistic	Unknown	National Museum of Beirut	none		

== Gallery ==
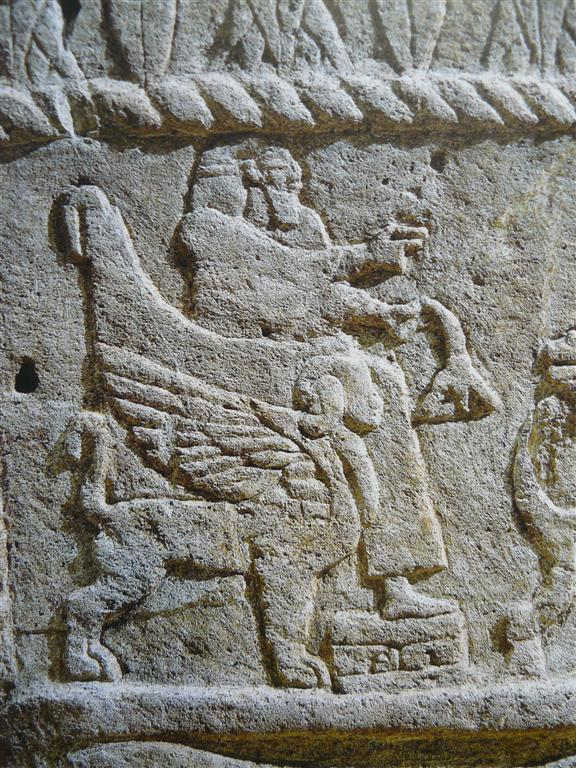
A similar throne depicted on the Ahiram sarcophagus

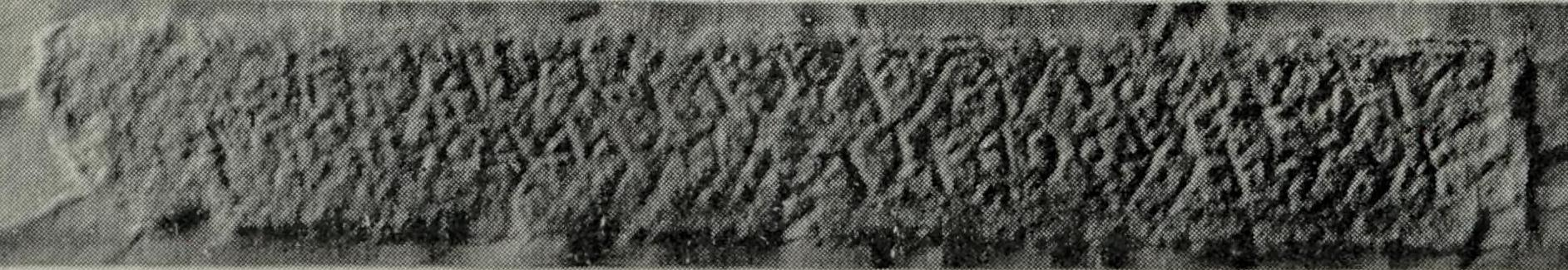
KAI 17 (photo)

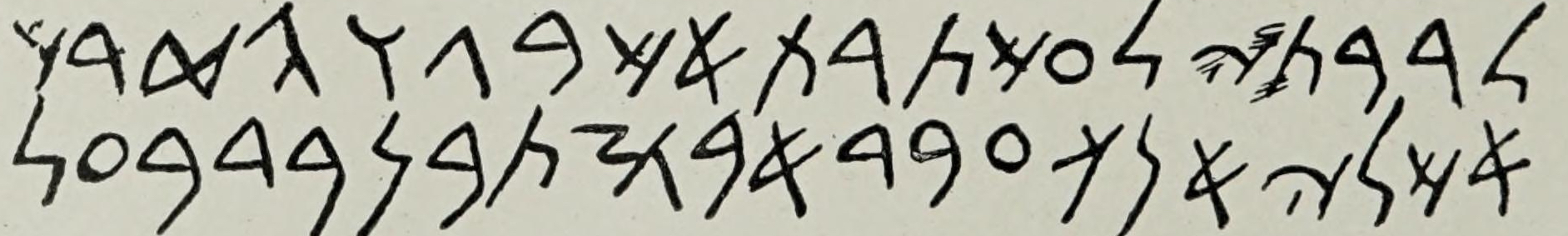
KAI 17 (copy)

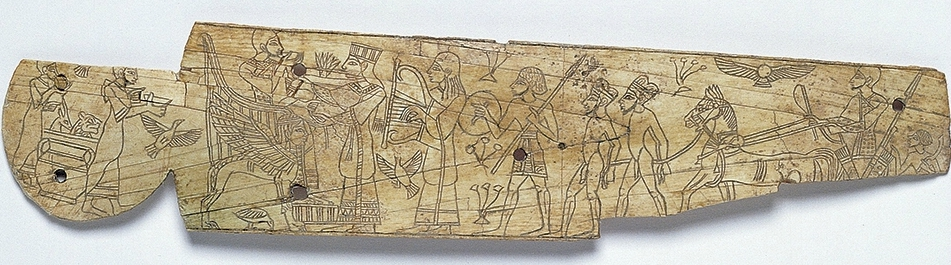
Ivory plaque with Throne of Astarte

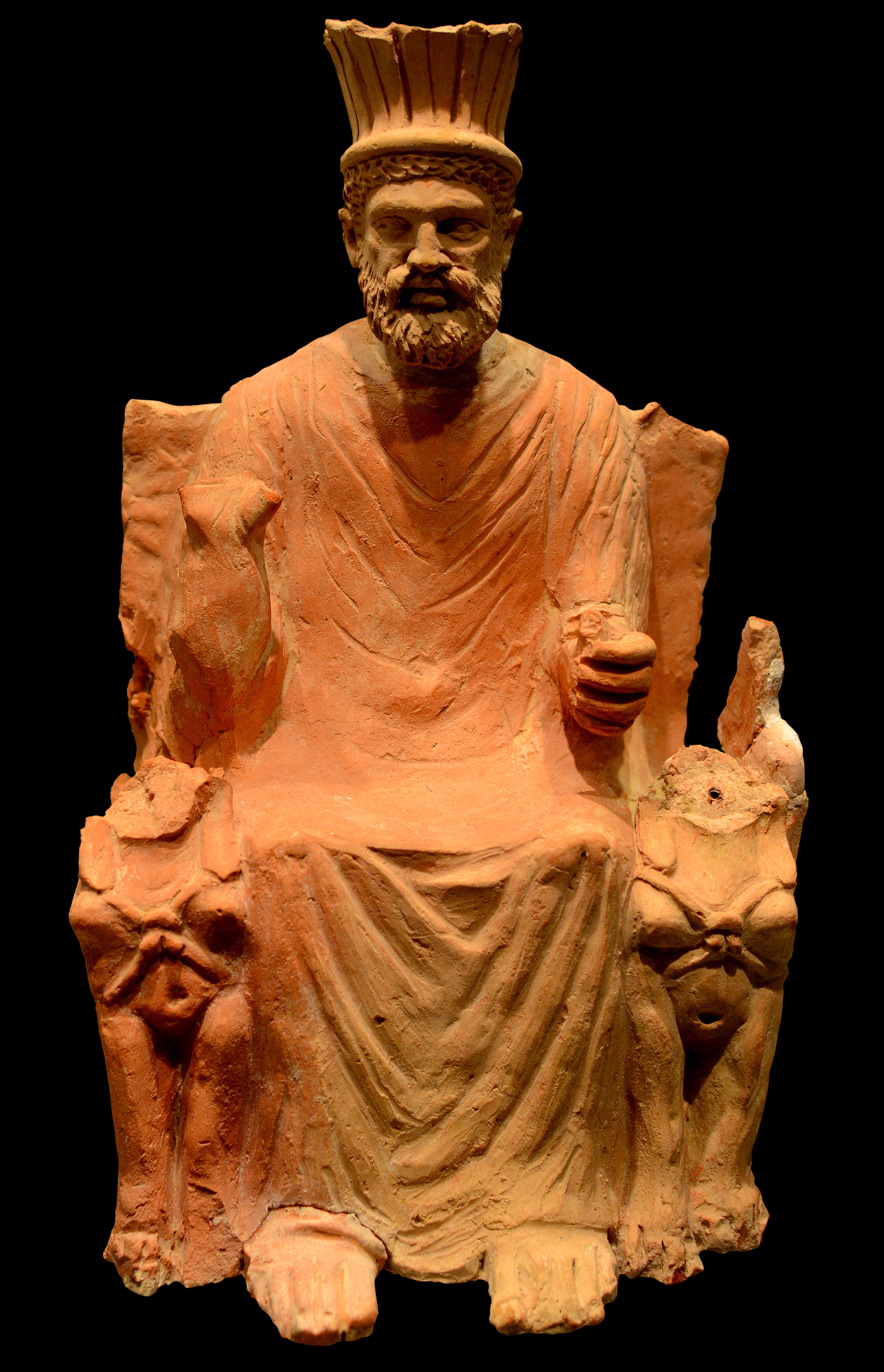
Punic statue from Tunisia (Sanctuaire de Thinissut)

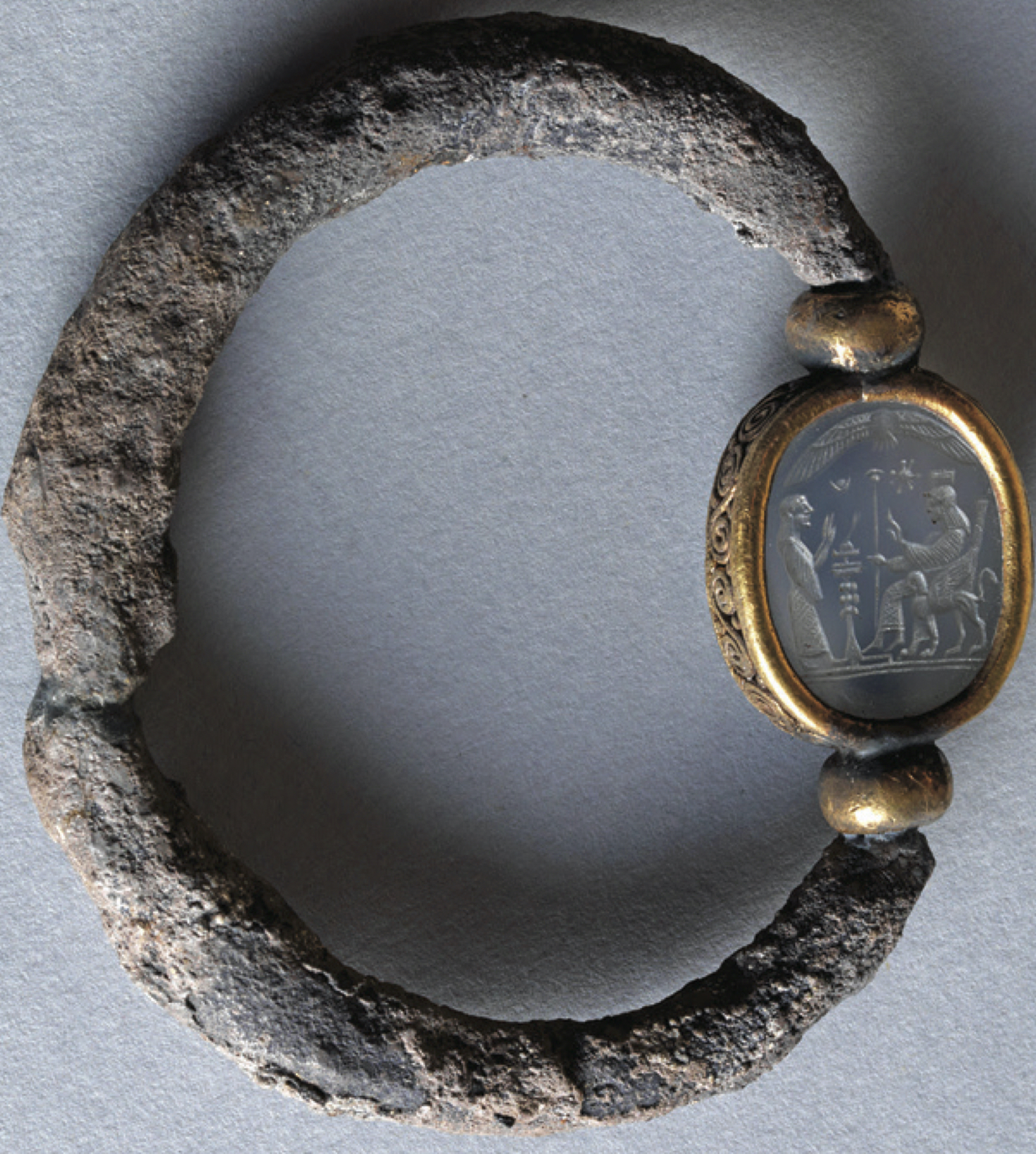
Scarab with Throne of Astarte

== Bibliography ==
- Sébastien Ronzevalle, Le "Trône d'Astarté", Mélanges de la Faculté Orientale (Beirut) 3 (1909), 755–83, pls 9–10;
- Sébastien Ronzevalle, 'Note sur un monument phénicien de la région de Tyr', CRAI (1907), 589–98
- James R. Davila and Bruce Zuckerman (1993). The Throne of ʿAshtart Inscription. Bulletin of the American Schools of Oriental Research, (289), 67–80. doi:10.2307/1357365
- Józef Milik (1967). Les papyrus araméens d'Hermoupolis et les cultes syro-phéniciens en Égypte perse. Biblica, 48(4), 546–622. Retrieved July 28, 2020, from www.jstor.org/stable/42618436
- Henri Seyrig. Antiquités syriennes. In: Syria. Tome 36 fascicule 1–2, 1959. pp. 38–89; doi : https://doi.org/10.3406/syria.1959.5447 https://www.persee.fr/doc/syria_0039-7946_1959_num_36_1_5447
- Edward Lipiński, Rereading the Inscriptions of the 'Throne of Astarte' and the Sidonian Obelisk, Journal of Semitic Studies, Volume 61, Issue 2, Autumn 2016, Pages 319–325, https://doi.org/10.1093/jss/fgw011
- Andre Lemaire, 'Tróne a Keroubs avec inscription phénicienne', in A. Lemaire (ed.), Phéniciens d'Orient et d'Occident: Mélanges Josette Elayi, Cahiers de Institut du Proche-Orient Ancien du Collége de France, 2 (Paris, Maisonneuve, 2014), pp. 127-45.
