= Phoenician sundial =

Sundial discovered in Lebanon

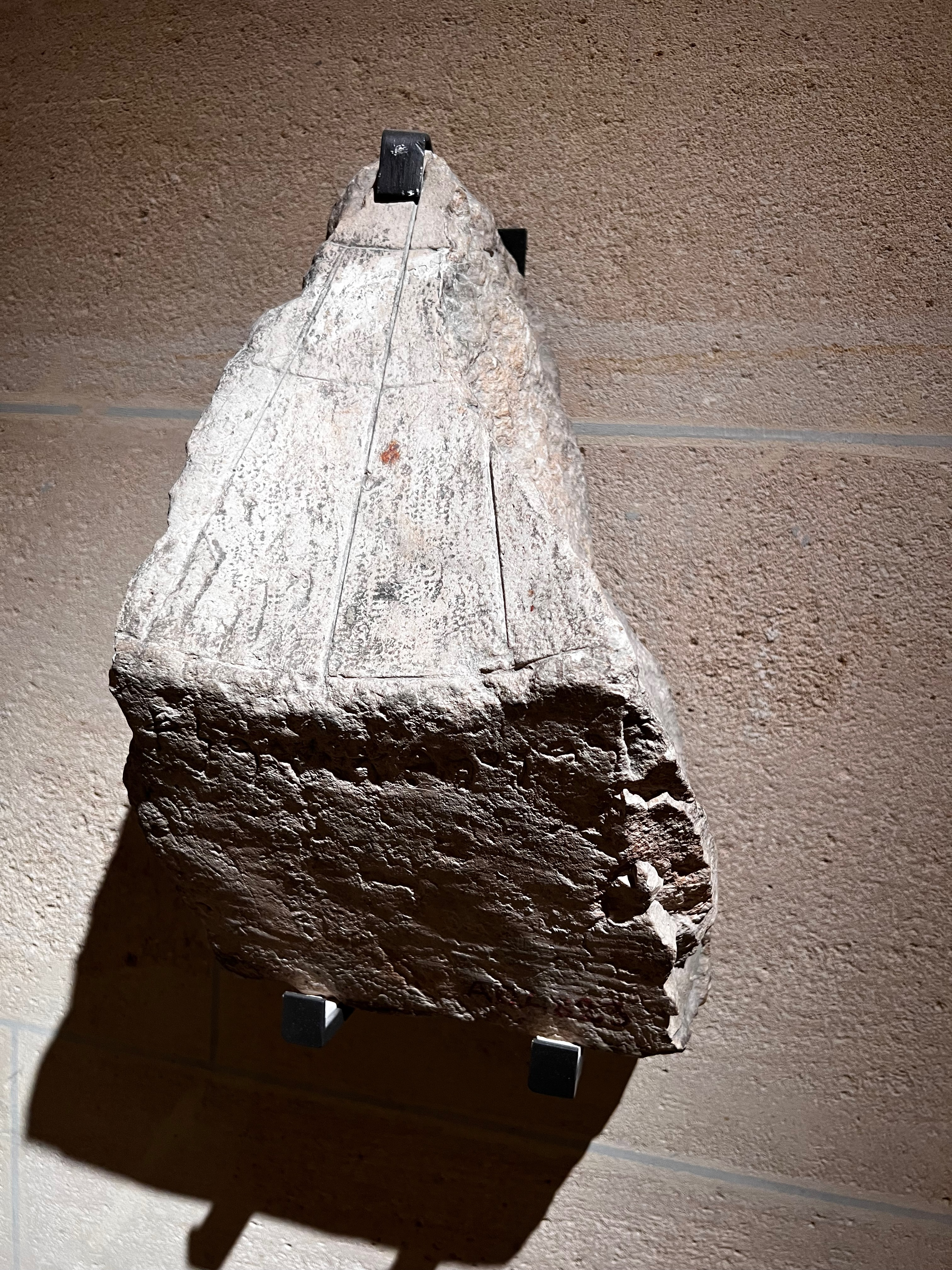
The Louvre fragment

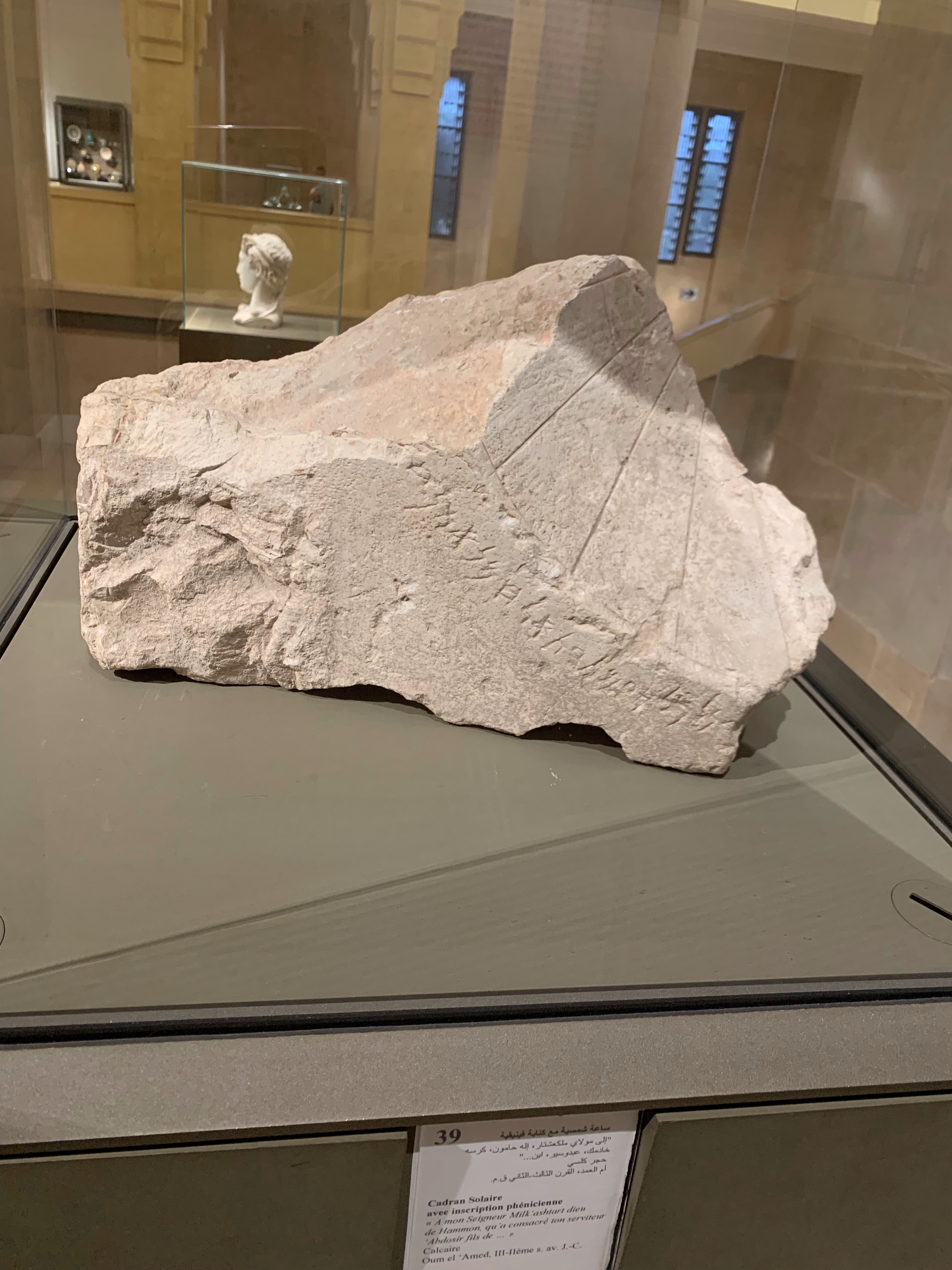
The Beirut fragment

The Phoenician sundial is a 2,000 year old scaphe sundial discovered in Umm al-Amad, Lebanon.

It was found in two fragments, 80 meters apart. The first fragment was discovered by Ernest Renan's Mission de Phénicie in 1860–61, whereas the second fragment was found in the 1940s in Maurice Dunand's 1943–45 excavations.

The first fragment, known as CIS I 9, is exhibited at the Louvre Museum (AO 4823) and the other at the National Museum of Beirut (No. 4880).

A replica of the fully reconstructed sundial is in the Saint Nicolas Garden in Achrafieh, Beirut.

The scaphe sundial is in the shape of a half-sphere or a concave quarter-sphere, comprising eleven lines dividing the time interval between sunrise and sunset into twelve equal parts.

== Inscriptions ==
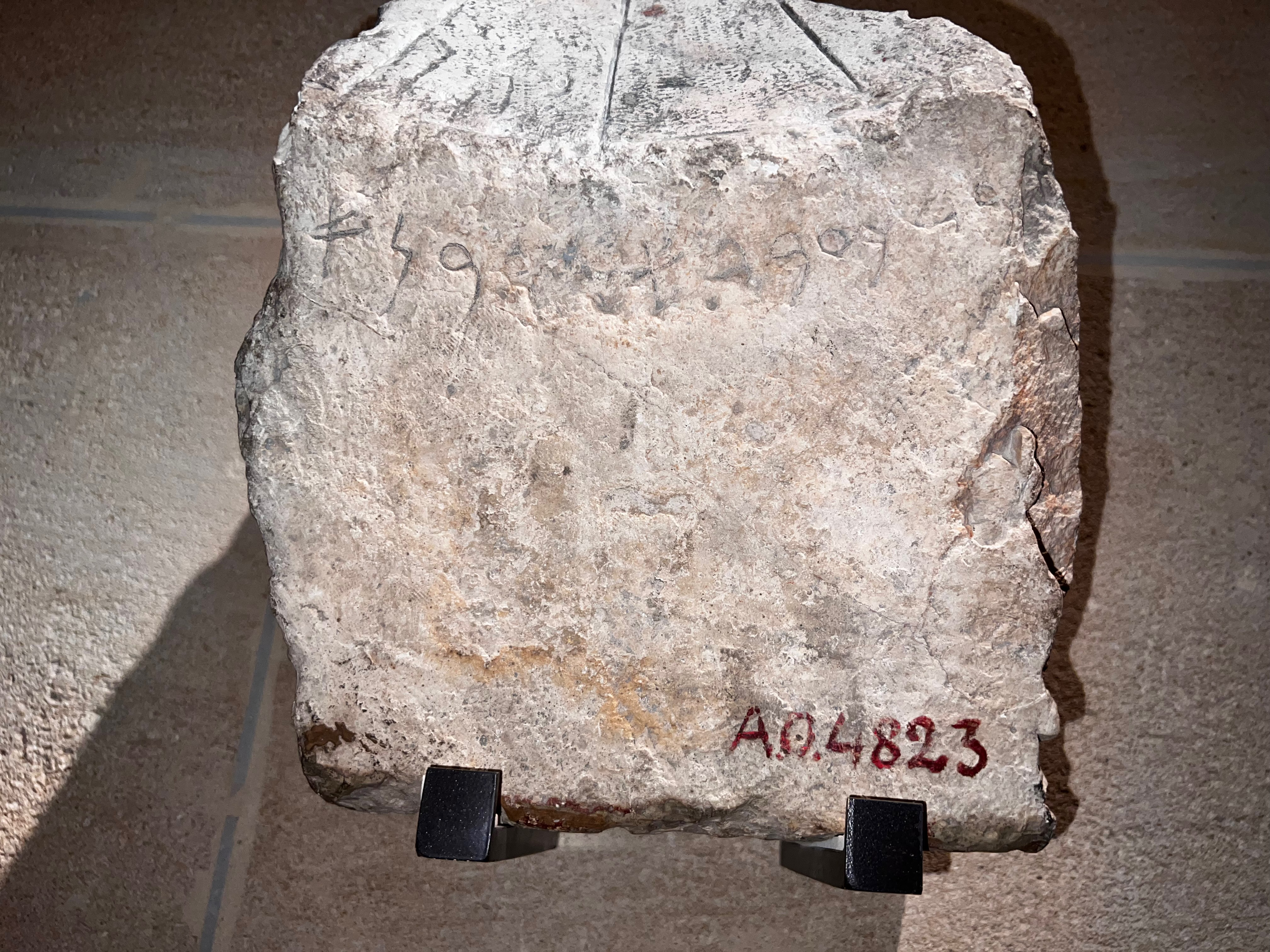
Close up of the inscription in the Louvre

The combined fragments include a Phoenician dedication:

[L] ’DN LMLK ‘ŠTRT ’L ḤMN ‘Š ND[R] ‘BDK ‘BD’SR BN ’[

To Lord Milkashtart, god of Hammon", from your servant Abdosir, son of [ ]

== Gallery ==
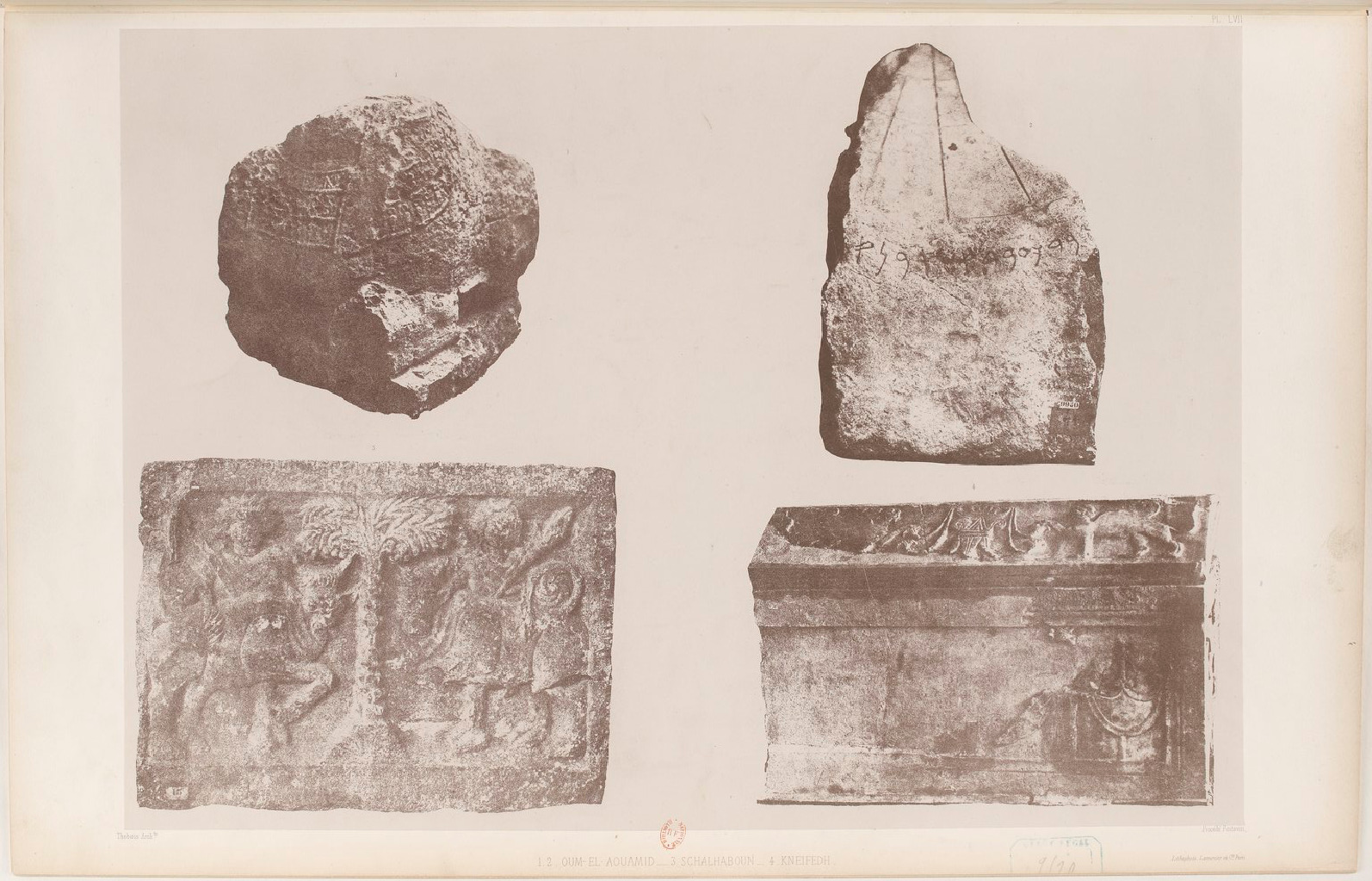
In the Mission de Phénicie

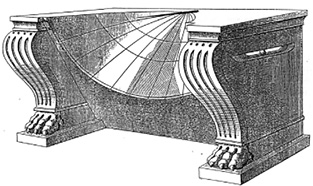
Reconstruction in the Mission de Phénicie
