= Baalshamem inscription =

c. 132 Phoenician inscription

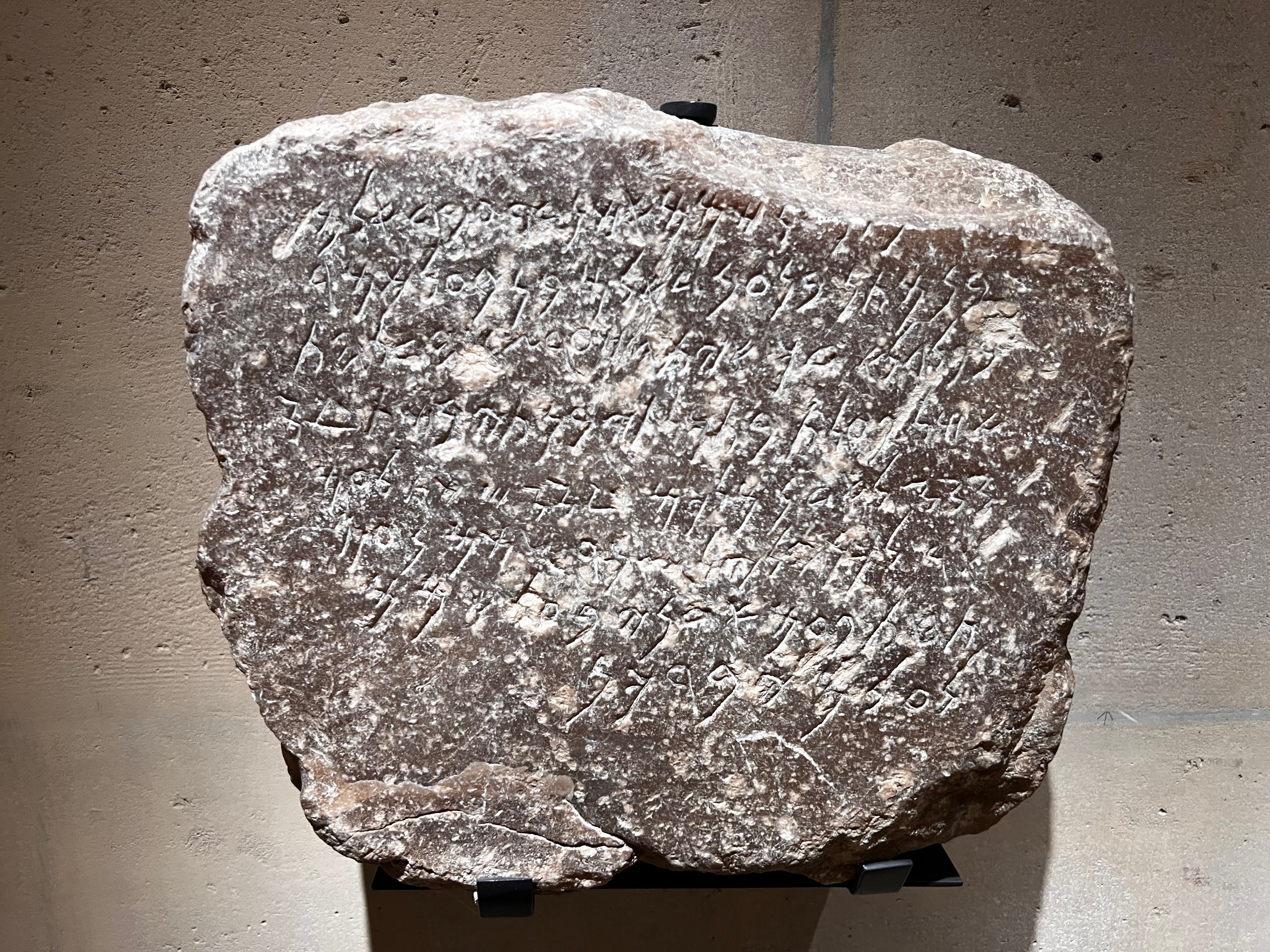
- The inscription in the Louvre
- Material: Alabaster
- Height: 29 cm
- Width: 32 cm
- Created: c. 132 BC
- Discovered: 1860–1861; Umm al-Amad, Lebanon, South, Lebanon
- Present location: Paris, Ile-de-France, France

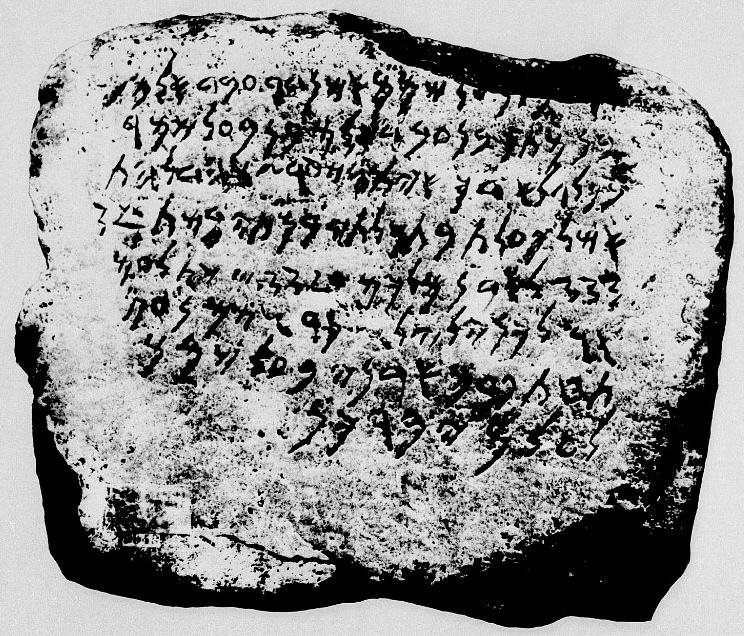
Baalshamem inscription in Mission de Phénicie

The Baalshamem inscription is a Phoenician inscription discovered in 1860–61 at Umm al-Amad, Lebanon, the longest of three inscriptions found there during Ernest Renan's Mission de Phénicie. All three inscriptions were found on the north side of the hill; this inscription was found in the foundation of one of the ruined houses covering the hill.

The inscription is on an alabaster slab about 32 x 29cm. The writing is not deeply engraved and is not considered to be of monumental character; it was found almost intact except for the beginning, consisting of eight letters, which scholars were able to reconstruct partly from the traces present and partly from the content of the inscription.

The inscription is known as KAI 18 or CIS I 7. Today it is on display at the Louvre, with ID number AO 4831.

== The inscription ==
The Phoenician characters read from right to left; (Note: Unfortunately the rendered direction of the Phoenician text may vary across web browsers. See relevant talk page section.) characters inside brackets denote a filled in lacuna:

(line 1)	𐤋𐤀𐤃𐤍 𐤋𐤁𐤏𐤋𐤔𐤌𐤌 𐤀𐤔 𐤍𐤃𐤓 𐤏𐤁𐤃𐤀𐤋𐤌	[L’DN L]B‘L-ŠMM ’Š NDR ‘BD’LM	[(This monument is dedicated) to the Lord, to] Ba‘l-samêm! He who vowed (the monument) (was) ‘Abd’ilim,
(2)	𐤁𐤍 𐤌𐤕𐤍 𐤁𐤍 𐤏𐤁𐤃𐤀𐤋𐤌 𐤁𐤍 𐤁𐤏𐤋𐤔𐤌𐤓	BN MTN BN ‘BD’LM BN B‘LŠMR	son of Mittun, son of ‘Abd’ilim, son of Ba‘alsamor,
(3)	𐤁𐤐𐤋𐤍 𐤋𐤀𐤃𐤊 𐤀𐤉𐤕 𐤄𐤔𐤏𐤓 𐤆 𐤅𐤄𐤃𐤋𐤄𐤕	BPLG L’DK ’YT HŠ‘R Z WHDLHT	from the district of Laodicaea. (Note: Referring to Laodicea in Phoenicia, the former name of modern Beirut.) This gate and the doors
(4)	𐤀𐤔 𐤋𐤐𐤏𐤋𐤕 𐤁𐤕𐤊𐤋𐤕𐤉 𐤁𐤍𐤕𐤉 𐤁𐤔𐤕 𐤙𐤘	’Š L P‘LT BTKLTY BNTY BŠT 120(+)	that I made for it, I built at my own expense in the year 180
(5)	𐤘𐤘𐤘 𐤋𐤀𐤃𐤍 𐤌𐤋𐤊𐤌 𐤙𐤘𐤘𐤖𐤖𐤖 𐤔𐤕 𐤋𐤏𐤌	(+)60 L’DN MLKM 143 ŠT L‘M	of the Lord of Kings, (that is) year 143 of the people of
(6)	𐤑𐤓 𐤋𐤊𐤍𐤉 𐤋𐤉 𐤋𐤎𐤊𐤓 𐤅𐤔𐤌 𐤍𐤏𐤌	ṢR LKNY LY LSKR WŠM N‘M	Tyre, that it might be for me a memorial and (a monument to) my good name,
(7)	𐤕𐤇𐤕 𐤐𐤏𐤌 𐤀𐤃𐤍𐤉 𐤁𐤏𐤋𐤔𐤌𐤌	TḤT P‘M ’DNY B‘L-ŠMM	under the feet of (i.e., showing my fealty to) my Lord Ba‘al-samêm.
(8)	𐤋𐤏𐤋𐤌 𐤉𐤁𐤓𐤊𐤍	L‘LM YBRKN	May he bless me forever!

The title "Lord of Kings" in line 5 (’dn mlkm, ’adōn malkîm) was used by the Ptolemies who reigned Egypt as Pharaohs since 305 BCE. This would suggest the year 125 BCE as the date of the inscription. A slightly different date, 132 BCE, follows from the "people of Tyre" dating, that is reckoned from the year 275 BCE when the city abandoned the concept of monarchy and instead became a republic. If the reign of the first Ptolemy is counted from the First Battle of Gaza in 312 BCE, then both dates agree.

== Bibliography ==
- Editio Princeps: Renan, Ernest (1862). "Trois Inscriptions Phéniciennes Trouvées à Oum-El-Awamid". Journal asiatique: Ou recueil de mémoires d'extraits et de notices relatifs à l'histoire, à la philosophie, aux sciences, à la littérature et aux langues des peuples orientaux (in French). 20. Société Asiatique.
- Renan, Ernest (1863). "Addition au mémoire de M. Renan sur les inscriptions d'Oum-el-Awamid". Journal Asiatique (in French). Nov. -Dec. 1863. Société asiatique.: 517.
- Ledrain, Eugène, Notice sommaire des monuments phéniciens du Musée du Louvre, Musée du Louvre, Paris, Librairies des imprimeries réunies, 1888, p. 60, n° 126
- Clermont-Ganneau, C. (1895). "Nouvel essai d'interprétation de la première inscription phénicienne D'Oumm El-Awamid". Études d'archéologie orientale. Bibl. de l'École des Hautes Études, Sci. philol. et hist (in French). F. Vieweg.
- Bargès, J. J. L. (1863). "Observations sur les inscriptions phéniciennes du musée Napoléon III". Journal Asiatique (in French). Société asiatique.: 161–195.
- Levy, M.A. (1864). "Drei inschriften von Umm-el-Awamid". Phönizische studien (in German). F. E. C. Leuckart. p. 31-.
