= Phoenician Adoration steles =

Group of Phoenician and Punic steles

The Phoenician Adoration steles are a number of Phoenician and Punic steles depicting the adoration gesture (orans).

In Umm al-Amad, Lebanon, 23 such steles have been found. These date to between 100 and 400 BCE. Many of the steles contain inscriptions; these usually reference religious titles such as "priest", "chief", or "chief of gates". Of the males depicted, most images show the person in a long robe holding a bowl with an elongated handle in the shape of a naked girl considered to be the Ancient Egyptian Cosmetic Spoon: Young Girl Swimming.

== Baalyaton stele (KI 15) ==
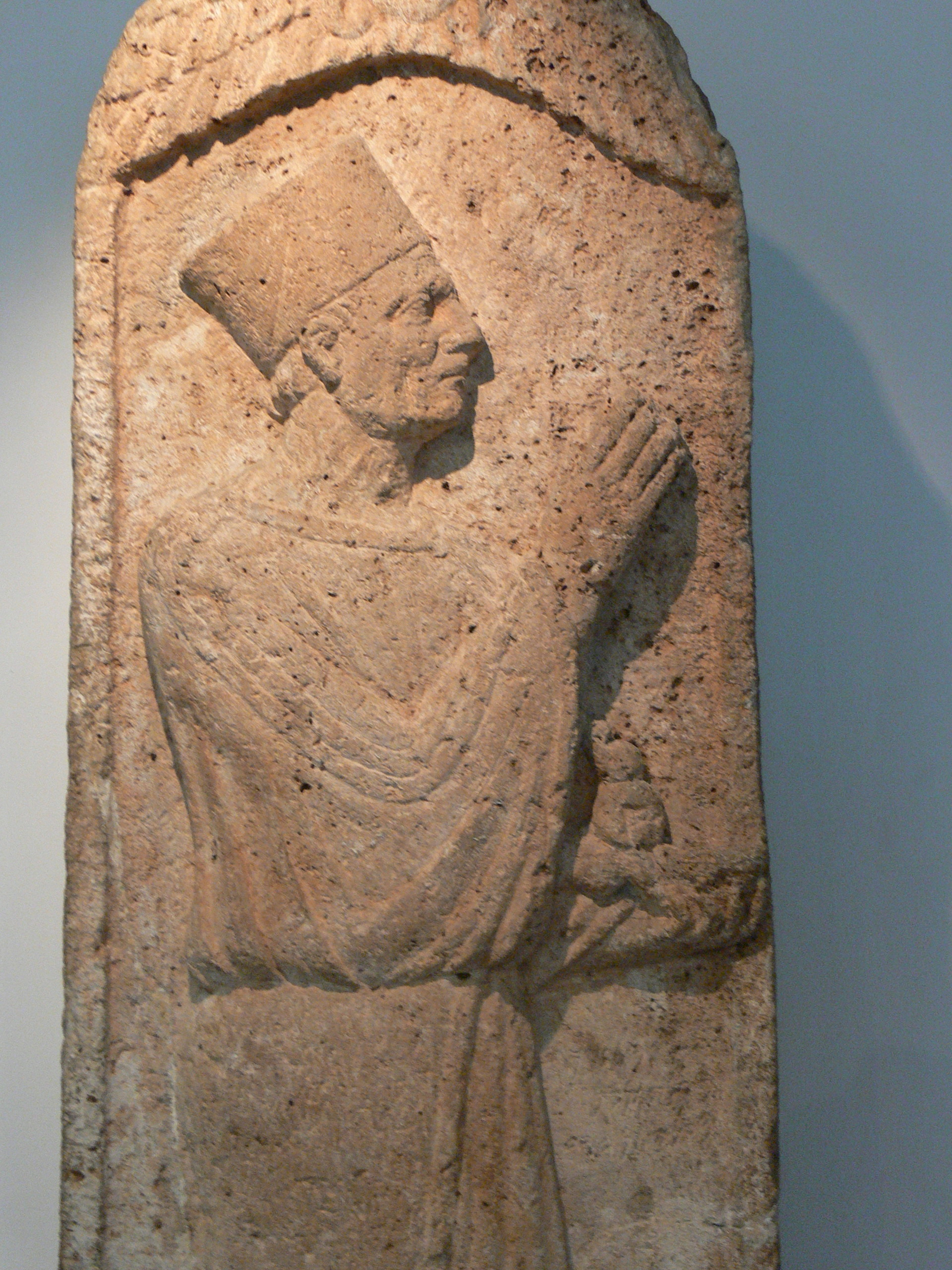
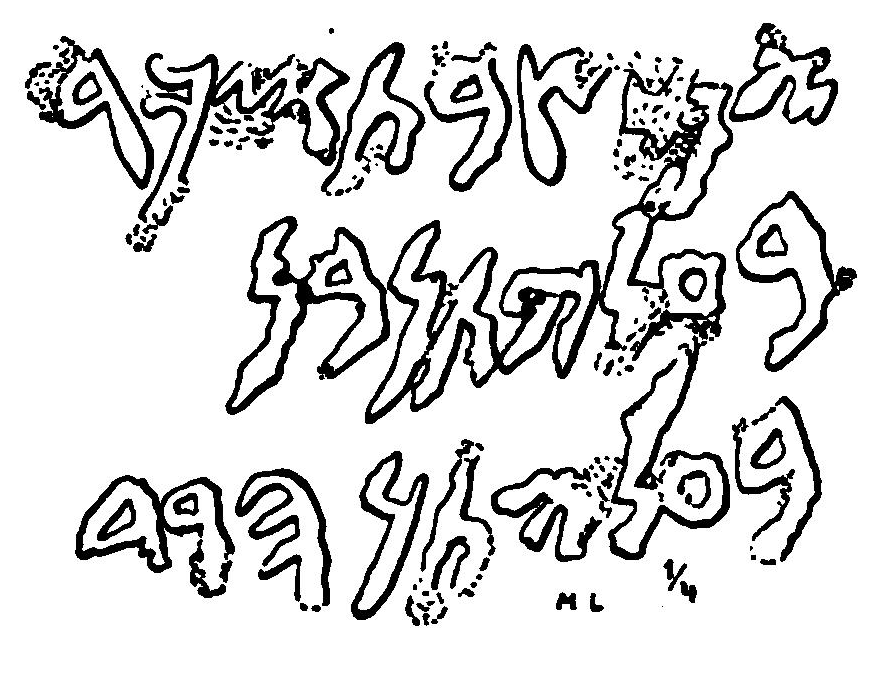
The stele at the Ny Carlsberg Glyptotek, and a sketch of the inscription (KI 15)

The Baalyaton stele is a stele dated to 150BC found in 1900 in three parts at Umm al-Amad, Lebanon.

On the front side is a representation of a man in bas-relief, with a three-line inscription engraved below the left hand. At the top is solar disk, in Egyptian style, flanked by two uraei (cobras). The main portrait is full length, beardless, in a tunic down to bare feet; the open right hand stretched forward in the habitual gesture of adoration.

The three line inscription is known as KI 15. The inscription has been translated as follows: “This is the memory stone of Baalyaton, son of Baalyaton hrd/b”

It was discovered by local antiquities dealers in c.1902-03, apparently on the encouragement of Charles Simon Clermont-Ganneau, and acquired by Jacobsen. It is currently at the Ny Carlsberg Glyptotek in Copenhagen.

== KI 14 or RES 307 (at the Louvre) ==
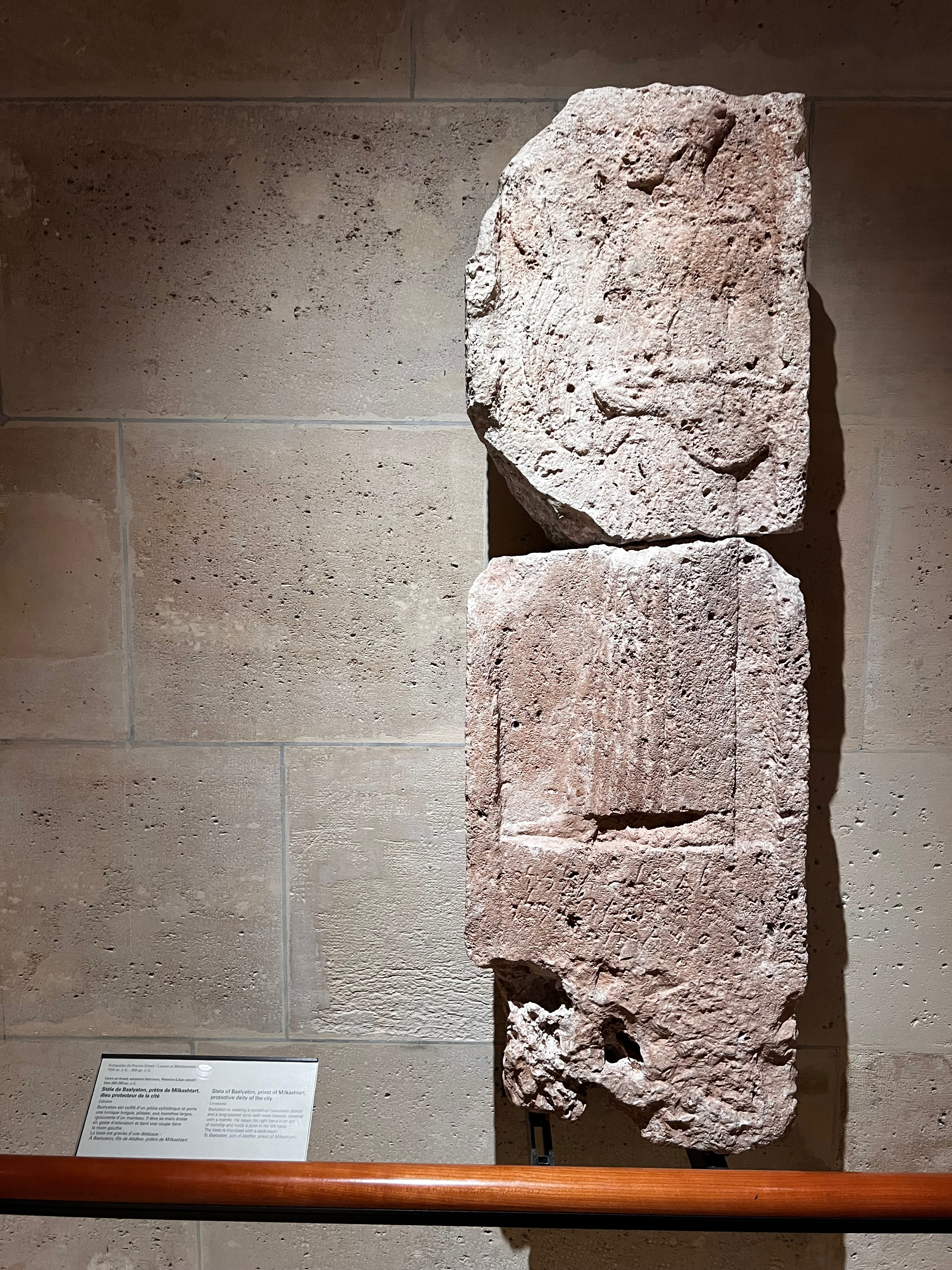
KI 14 or RES 307

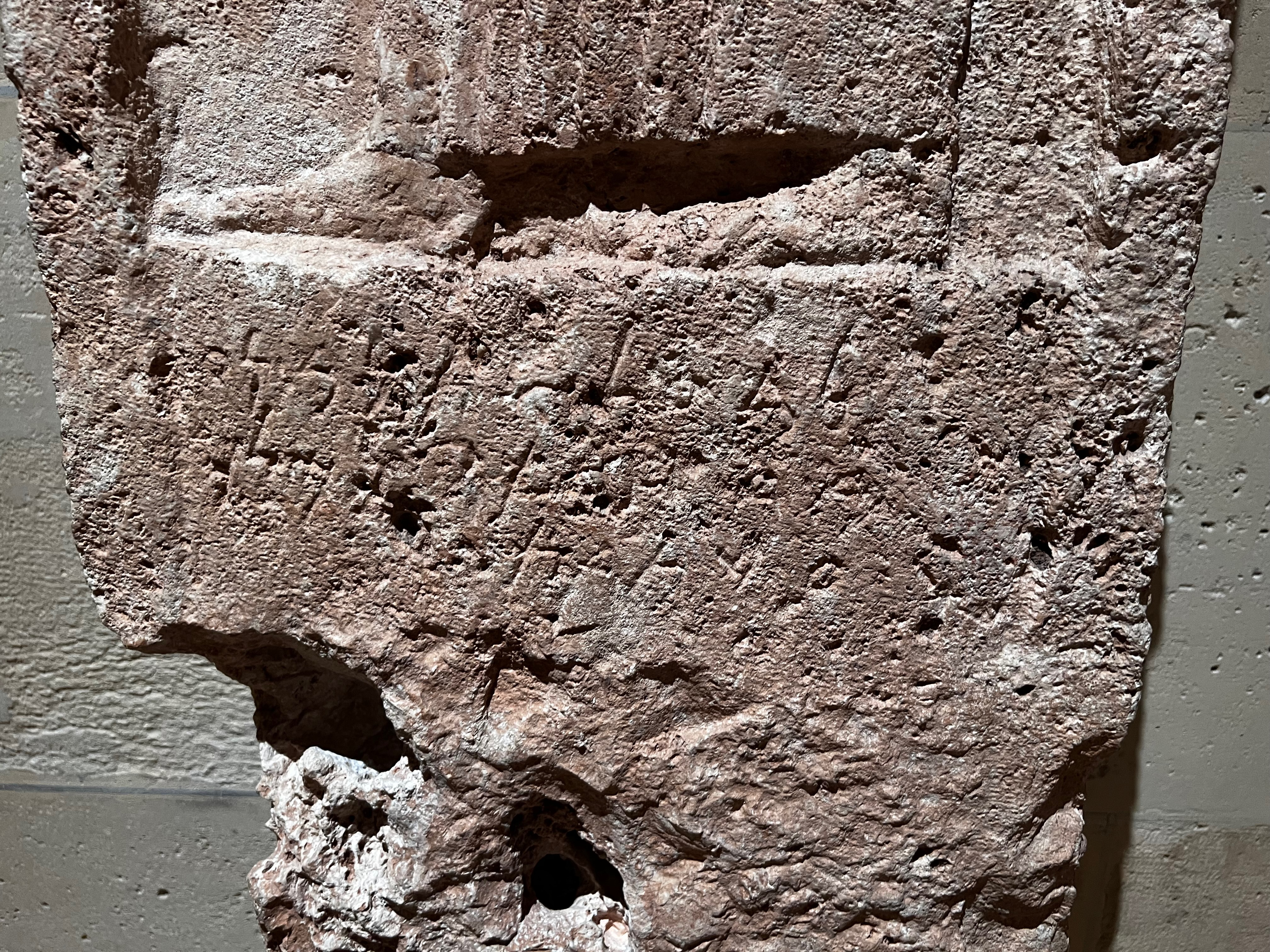
Inscription

The same 1902-03 unofficial excavations uncovered a number of additional steles, which were acquired by the Louvre. One of these, in three fragments, later known as KI 14 or RES 307, was dedicated to Baalyaton, priest of Milkashtart. On the upper part of the arched stele appears a dedicant wearing a polo shirt raising his hand in a sign of adoration. His feet and the inscription are on another fragment of the stele.

== Gallery ==
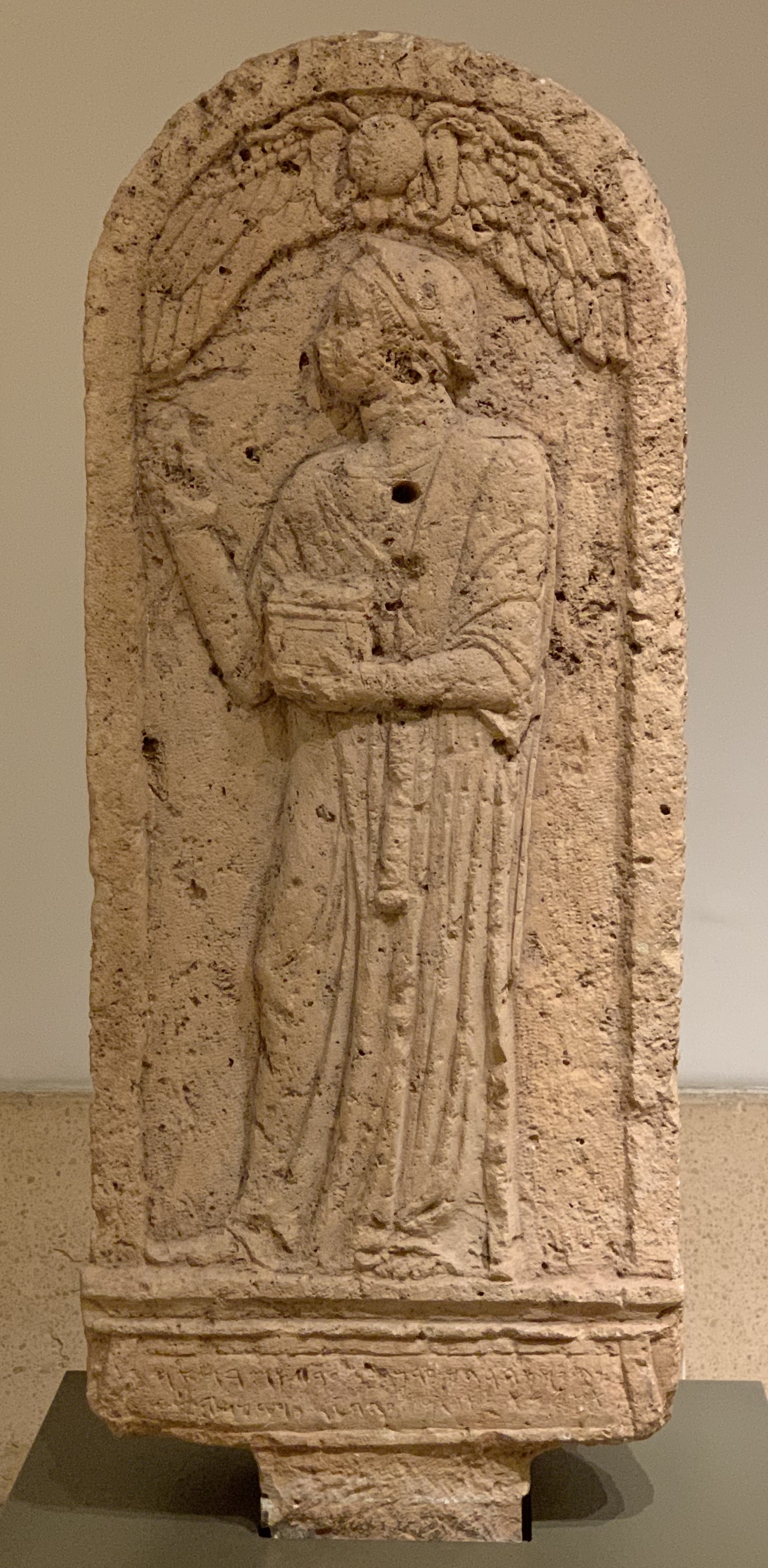
Funerary stele with a Phoenician inscription in the National Museum of Beirut: "To Baalshamar, son of 'Abdosir... chief of the porters"

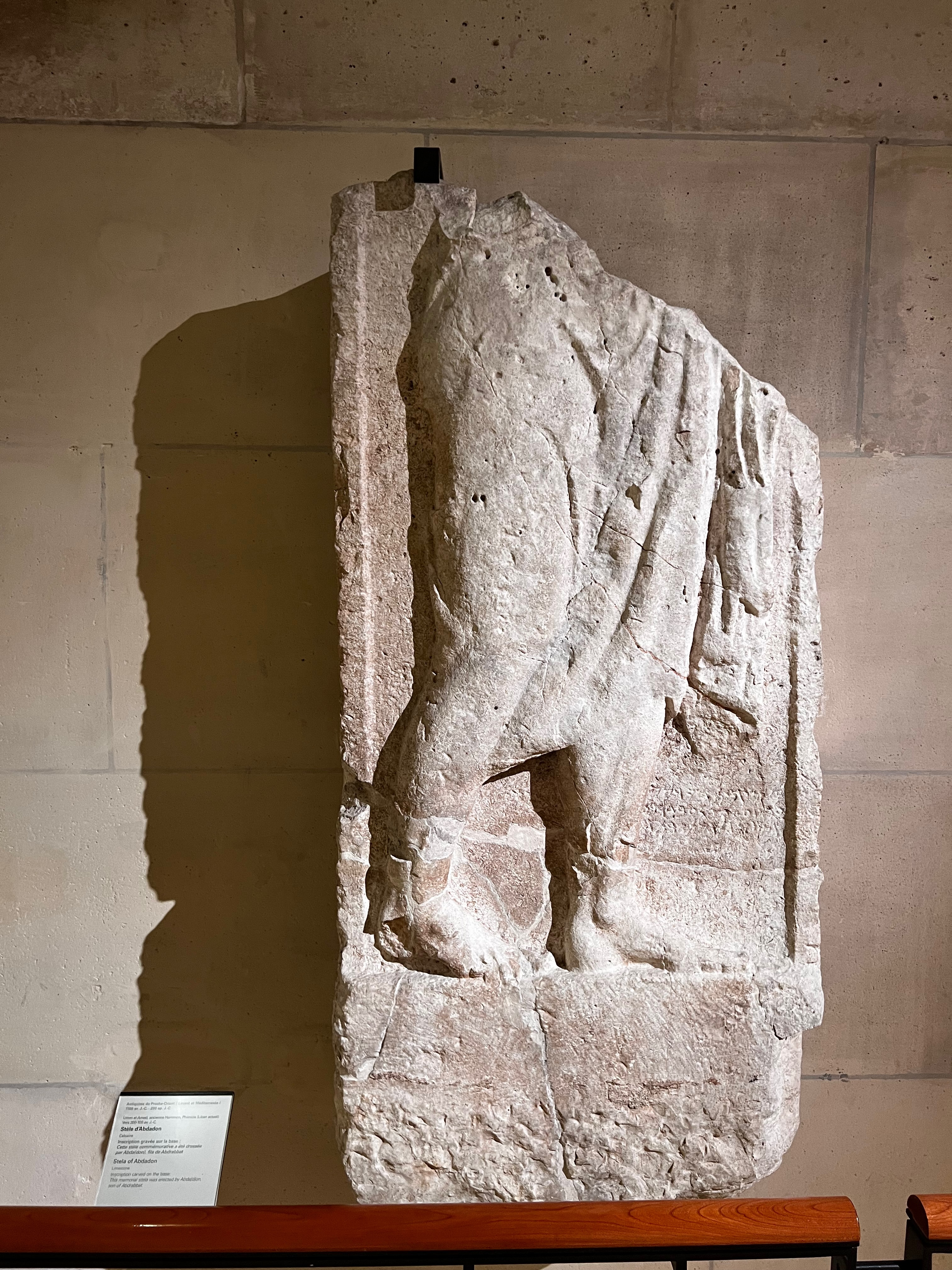
AO 4402 at the Louvre

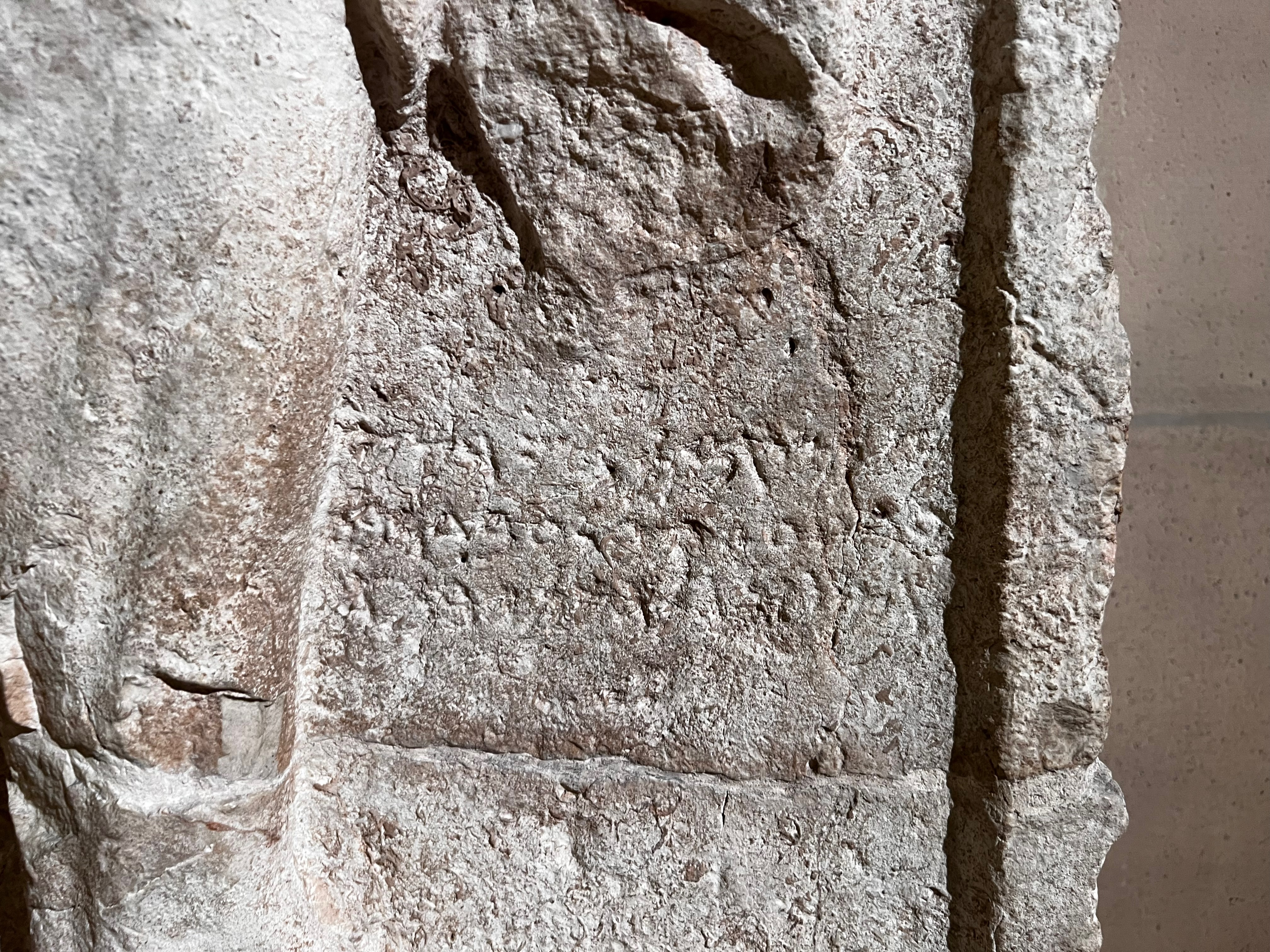
AO 4402 at the Louvre (close up)

== Bibliography ==
=== General ===
- Caubet, Annie; Fontan, Elisabeth; Gubel, Eric, Art phénicien : la sculpture de tradition phénicienne (Paris, Musée du Louvre), [Musée du Louvre/Département des Antiquités orientales], Paris, RMN/Snoeck, 2002, Disponible sur : M:\AO\Ouvrages numériques\Caubet-Fontan-Gubel_ArtPhénicien_2003.pdf, p. 144, n° 157
- Maës, Antoine, « Le costume phénicien des stèles d'Umm el-'Amed », dans Lipinski, Edward (dir.), Phoenicia and the Bible, Louvain, Peeters, (Studia Phoenicia, 11), 1991, P. 209–230, p. 212-213, fig. 2
- Maximilian F. Rönnberg, Bemerkungen zur phönizisch-punischen Priesterikonographie, Zeitschrift des Deutschen Palästina-Vereins, Bd. 133, H. 1 (2017), pp. 84–105
- Henrike Michelau, Hellenistische Stelen mit Kultakteuren aus Umm el-ʿAmed, Zeitschrift des Deutschen Palästina Vereins 130/1, 2014, 77-95
- Henrike Michelau, Adorantendarstellungen karthagischer und phönizischer Grabstelen, in: H. Töpfer / F. Schön (ed.), Karthago-Dialoge. Karthago und der punische Mittelmeerraum – Kulturkontakte und Kulturtransfers im 1. Jahrtausend vor Christus (RessourcenKulturen, 2; Tübingen), 137–158.

=== Baalyaton stele (KI 15 or RES 250) ===
- Mark Lidzbarski, Kanaanäische Inschriften 15
- RES 250
- Clermont-Ganneau, La stèle phénicienne d'Oumm el'Aouâmid, Receuil d’Archéologie Orientale 5, 1903, 1-8 and 84.Paris
- Note di Epigrafia fenicia I-IV, A.Catastini, Rivistate di studi fenicie XIII, 1985
- Lidzbarski, Mark, Ephemeris für semitische Epigraphik, volume I, p. 280 ff

=== KI 14 or RES 307 (at the Louvre) ===
- Mark Lidzbarski, Kanaanäische Inschriften 14
- RES 307
- Clermont-Ganneau, Un prêtre de Malak-Astarté, Recueil d'archéologie orientale (RAO V), Paris, 1903, p. 150-154
- Heuzey Léon. Archéologie orientale. In: Comptes rendus des séances de l'Académie des Inscriptions et Belles-Lettres, 46ᵉ année, N. 2, 1902. pp. 190–206. DOI: https://doi.org/10.3406/crai.1902.17111
- Louvre (AO 4047, AO 4062, AO 3137)
