= Umm al-Amad, Lebanon =

Archaeological site in Lebanon

Umm al-Amad
- ام العمد (Arabic)
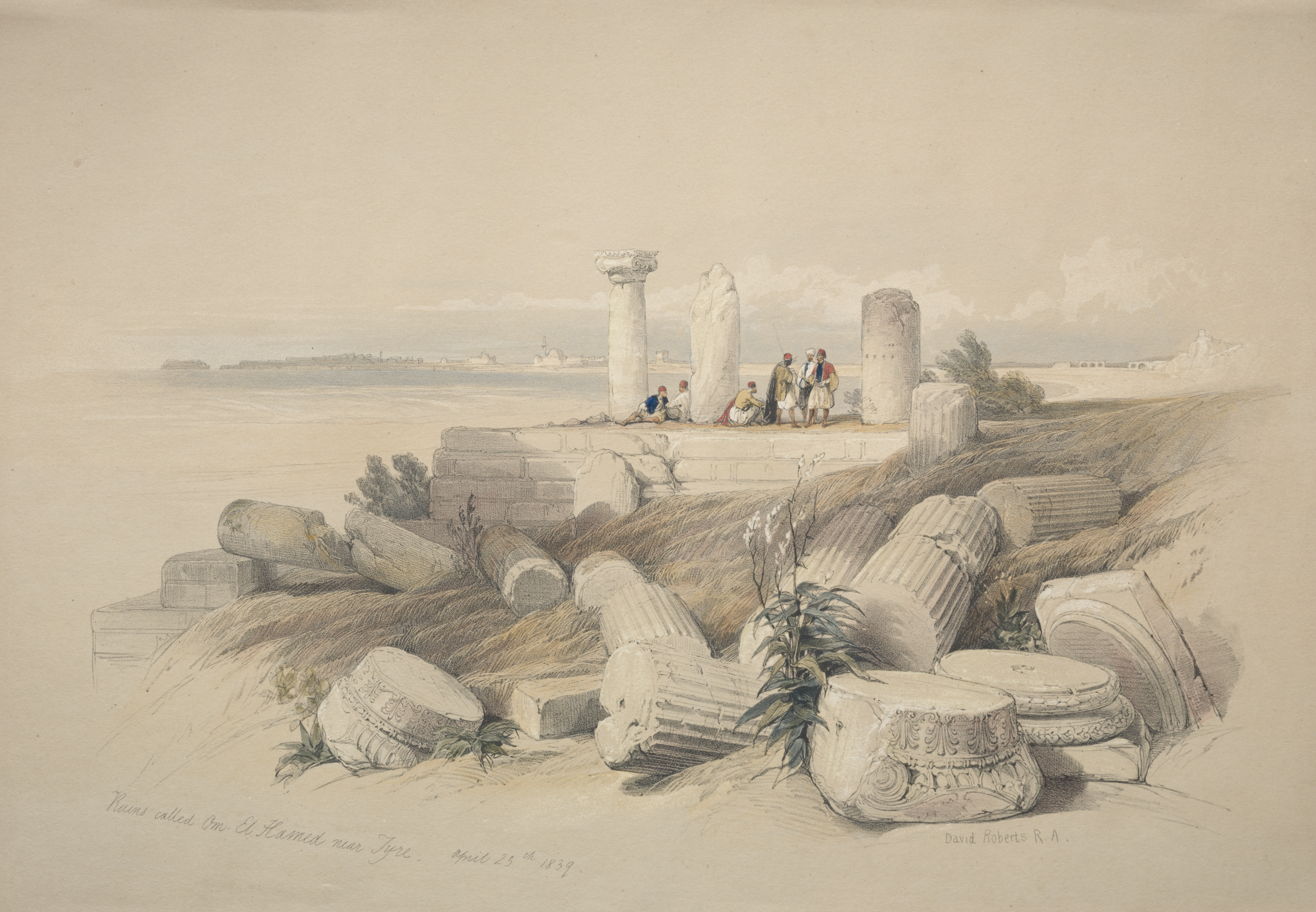
- Ruins in 1839, published in The Holy Land, Syria, Idumea, Arabia, Egypt, and Nubia

- Location within Lebanon
- 33.128°N 35.1535°E
- Location: Near Naqoura, Tyre District, South Lebanon

History
- Built: 287–222 BCE

Umm Al Amad (Arabic: ام العمد, romanized: Umm al-ʿAmad), or Umm el 'Amed or al Auamid or el-Awamid, is an Hellenistic period archaeological site near the town of Naqoura in Lebanon. It was discovered by Europeans in the 1770s, and was excavated in 1861. It is one of the most excavated archaeological sites in the Phoenician heartland.

== Description ==
The Umm Al Amad site measures more than six hectares. Numerous artefacts from the site are held at the National Museum of Beirut and the Louvre. The site contains two temples, the Temple of Milk‘ashtart and the Eastern Temple with Throne Chapel, which are estimated to have been built between 287 and 222 BCE.

23 Phoenician Adoration steles have been found at the site depicting upright people in an "adoration gesture", all dating from 100 to 400 BCE.

== History ==
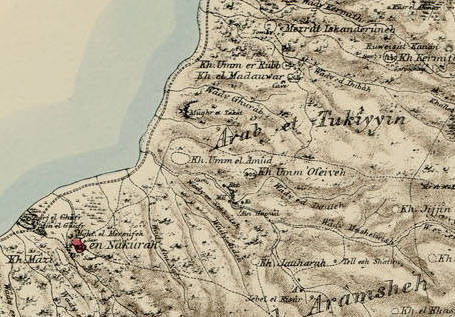
Umm al-Amad on an 1880 map

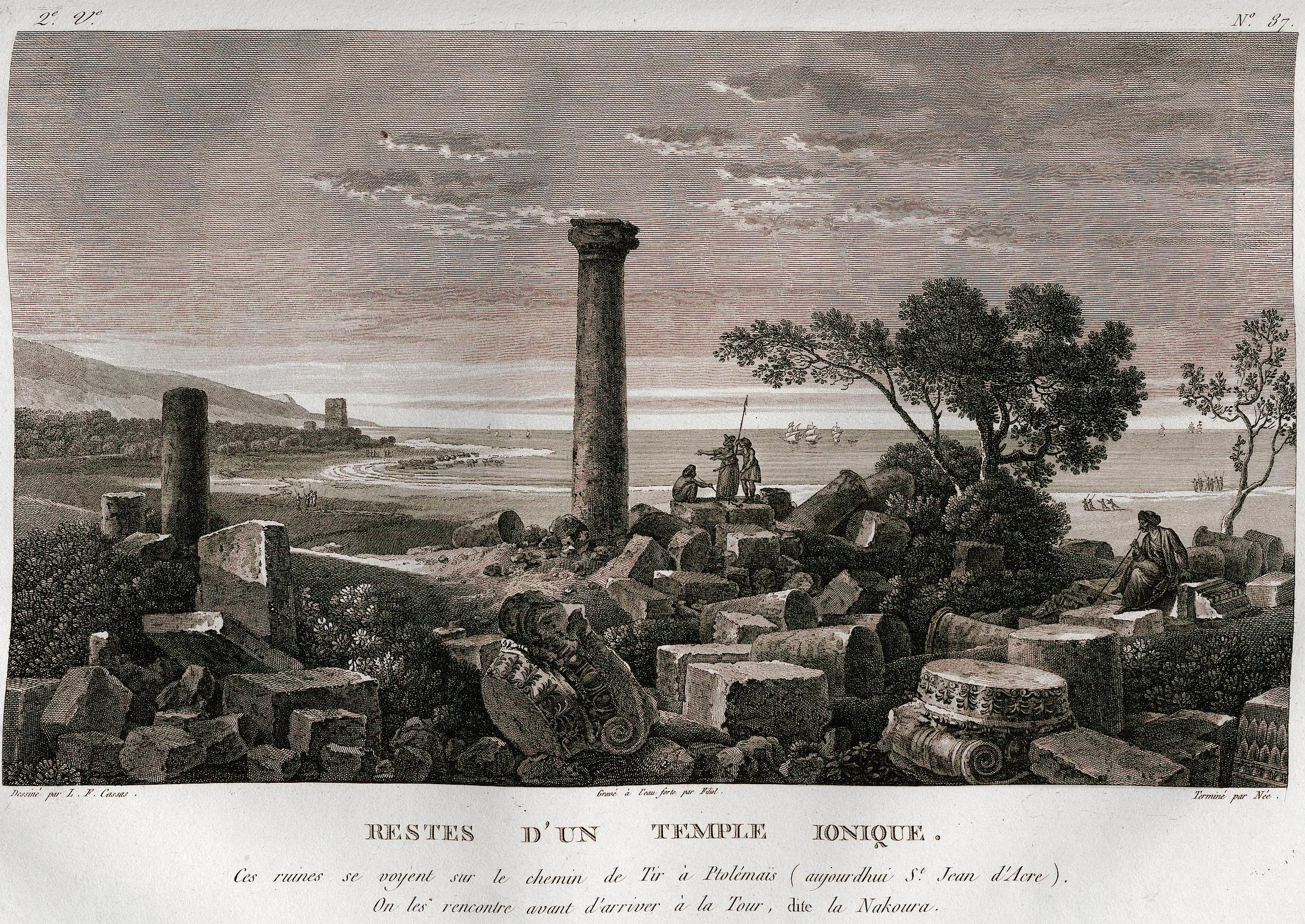
Ruins in the 1780s, by Louis-François Cassas.

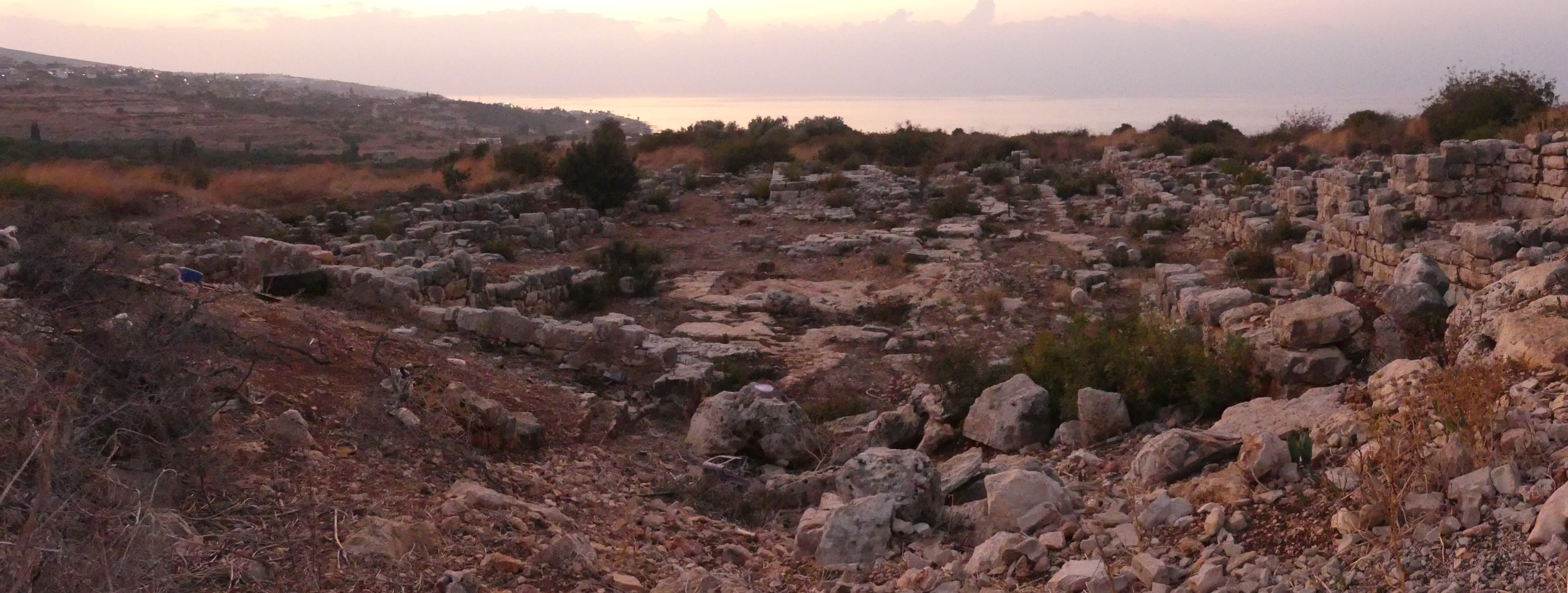
Ruins of the Eastern temple (2019)

Umm Al Amad was apparently built in the Persian or Hellenistic period, although some scholars have argued for earlier. No buildings from the Roman era were discovered, but there is evidence for Byzantine reoccupation. The original name of the site is uncertain, but may have been Hammon (Joshua 19:28) or Alexandrouskene.

Umm Al Amad was first depicted in modern times in the 1780s by Louis-François Cassas. Melchior de Vogüé explored the site in 1853. The site was first excavated in 1861 by Ernest Renan in his Mission de Phénicie. He stopped when he found the remains were no older than the Hellenistic age.

In 1881, the British PEF Survey of Palestine described the site as "extensive ruins" and noted "traces of aqueducts origin water to birkets".

Eustache de Lorey excavated the site in 1921, but published only photographs of his work. Maurice Dunand led excavations at the site between 1943 and 1945.

Ali Badawi, the long-time chief archaeologist for Southern Lebanon of the Directorate-General of Antiquities at the Ministry of Culture, said:

There are the remains of the city known as Oum Al-Amed, dating back to the 2nd century B.C., if not earlier. The city was a religious center for a Phoenician cult, especially that of the Phoenician god Baal Hamon, whose memory lives on in a nearby valley known as Wadi Hamol (the Valley of Hamol). The site still contains the remnants of two important temples, as well as other buildings, dating back to the 2nd and 3rd century B.C., and represents the last of Phoenician culture under the rule of the Greeks. Several steles bearing Phoenician inscriptions were discovered on the site, and an important sundial stone.

During the 2024 Israeli invasion of Lebanon, UNESCO gave enhanced protection to 34 cultural sites in Lebanon including the Umm al-Amad archaeological site to safeguard it from damage.

== Gallery ==
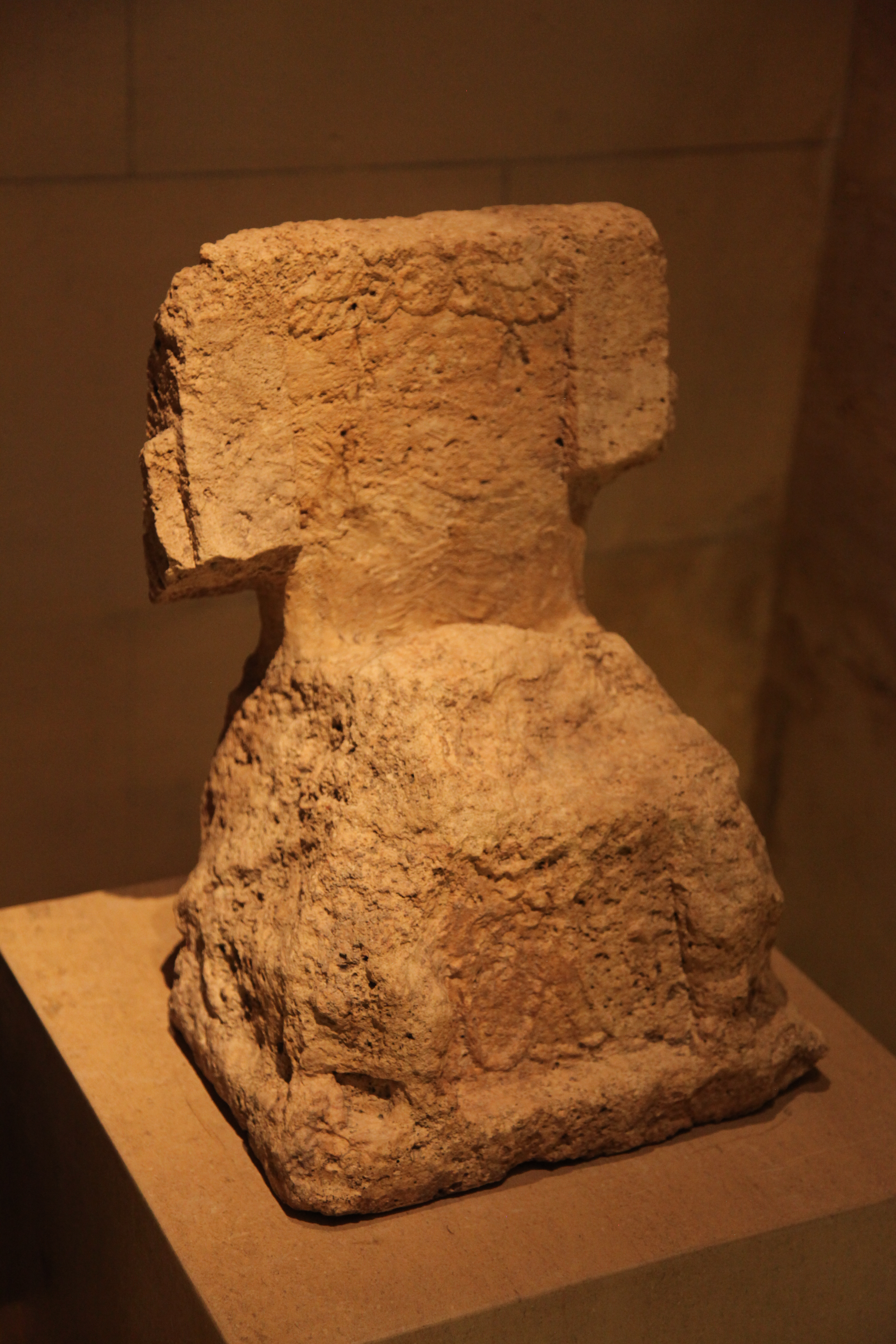
Throne of Astarte in the Louvre

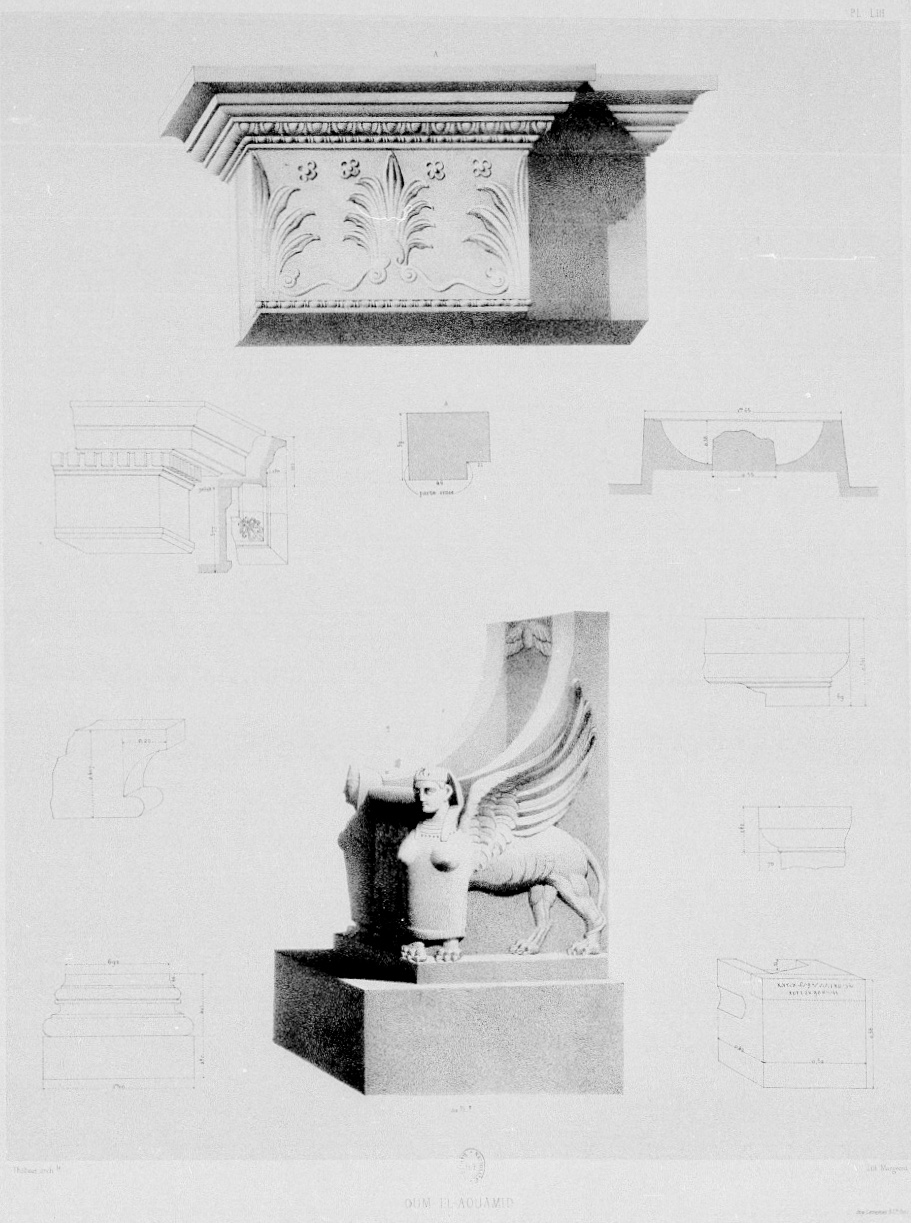
Reconstruction of the Throne of Astarte

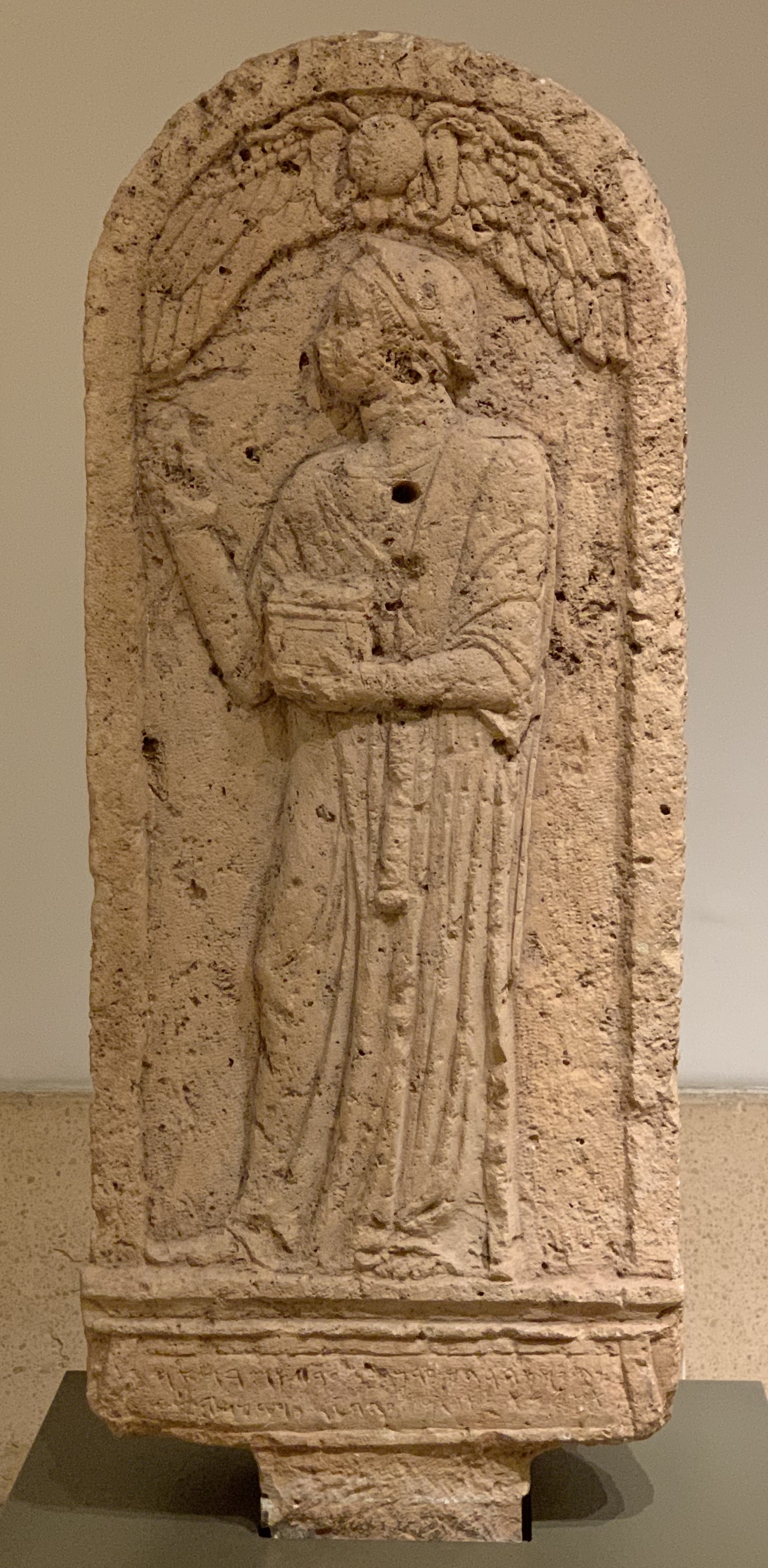
Funerary stele with a Phoenician inscription in the National Museum of Beirut: "To Baalshamar, son of 'Abdosir... chief of the porters"

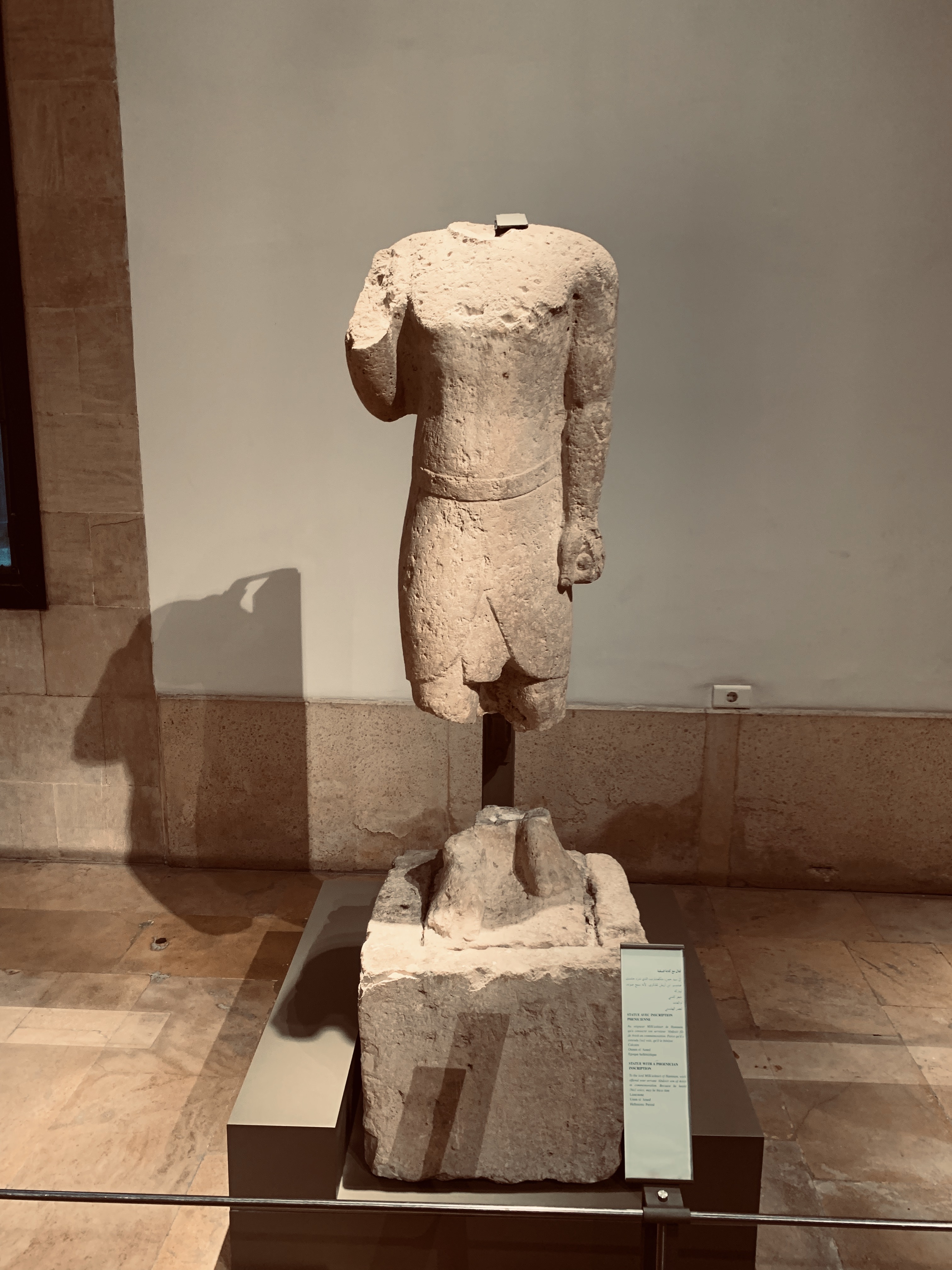
A statue with a Phoenician inscription in the National Museum of Beirut

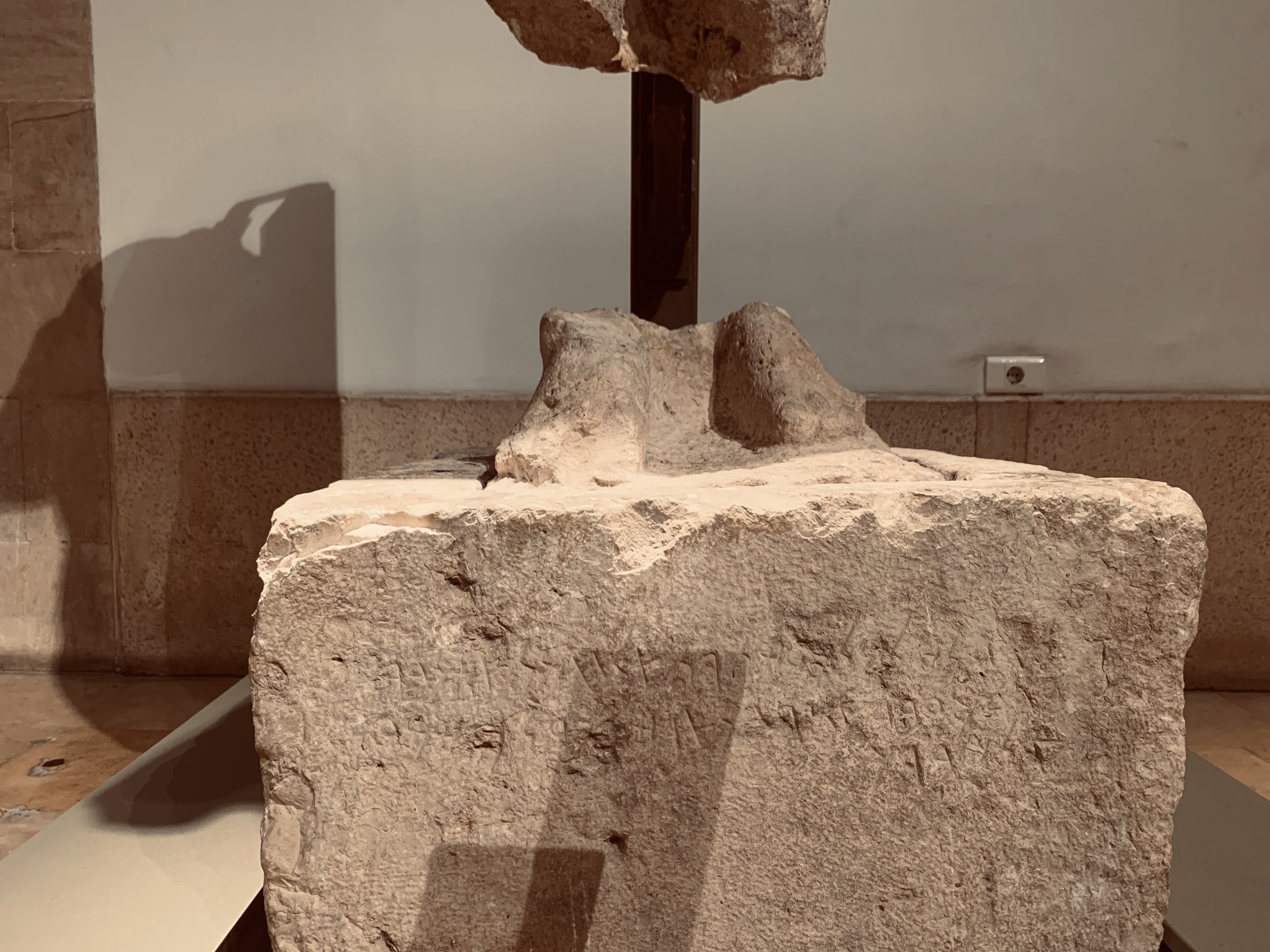
A close-up of the inscription

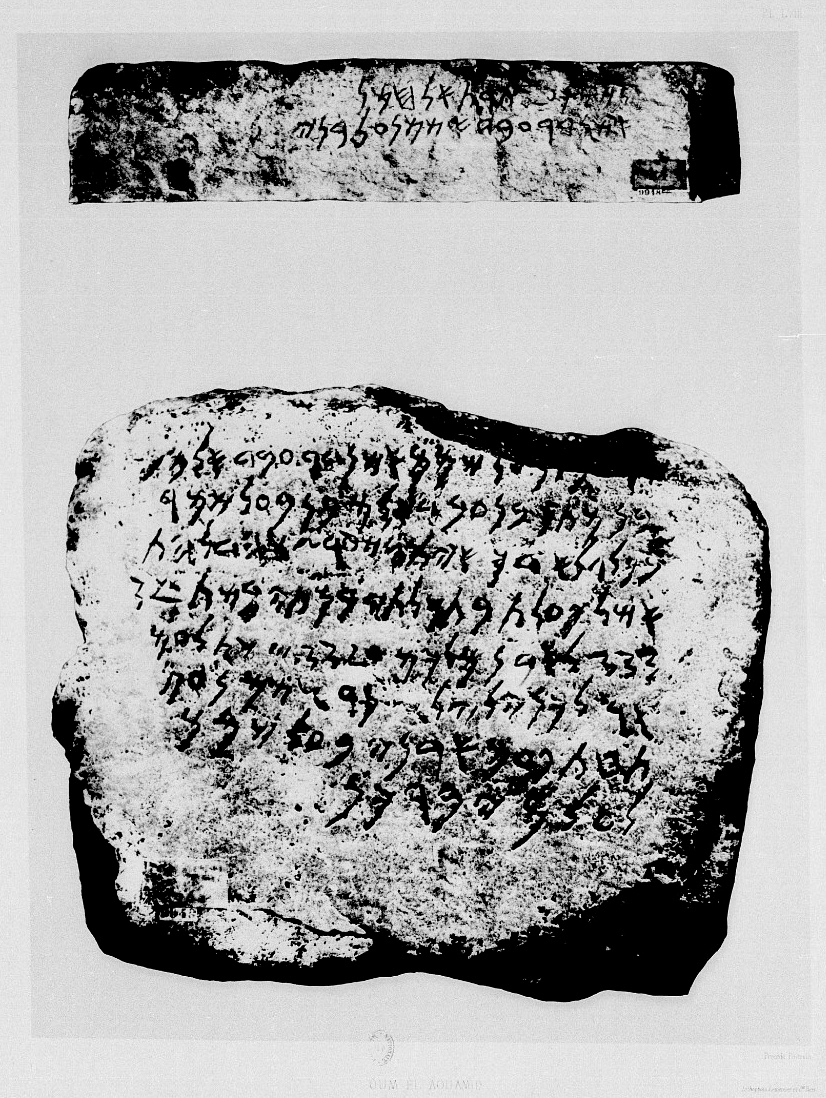
Baalshamem inscription

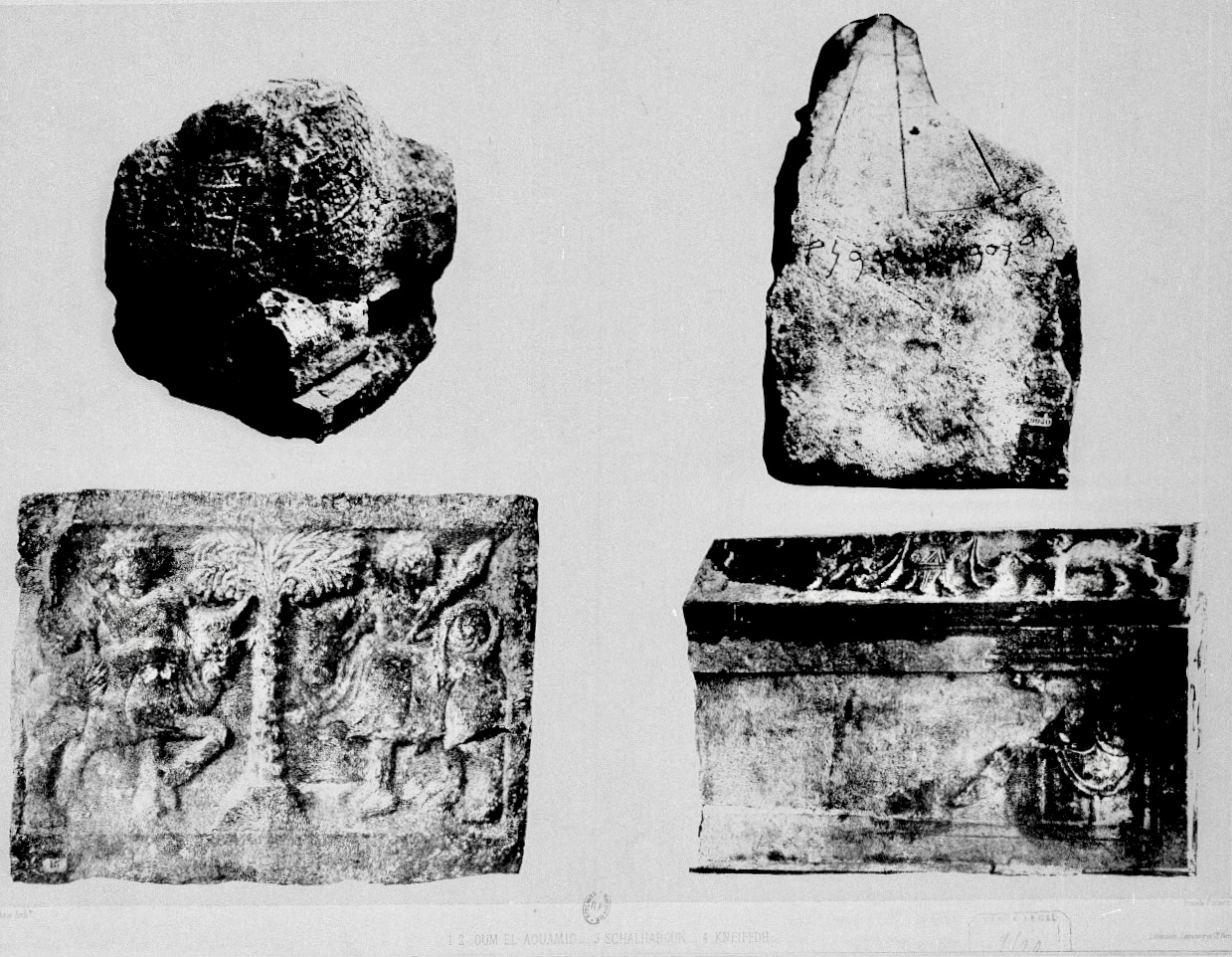
Various artefacts discovered by Ernest Renan

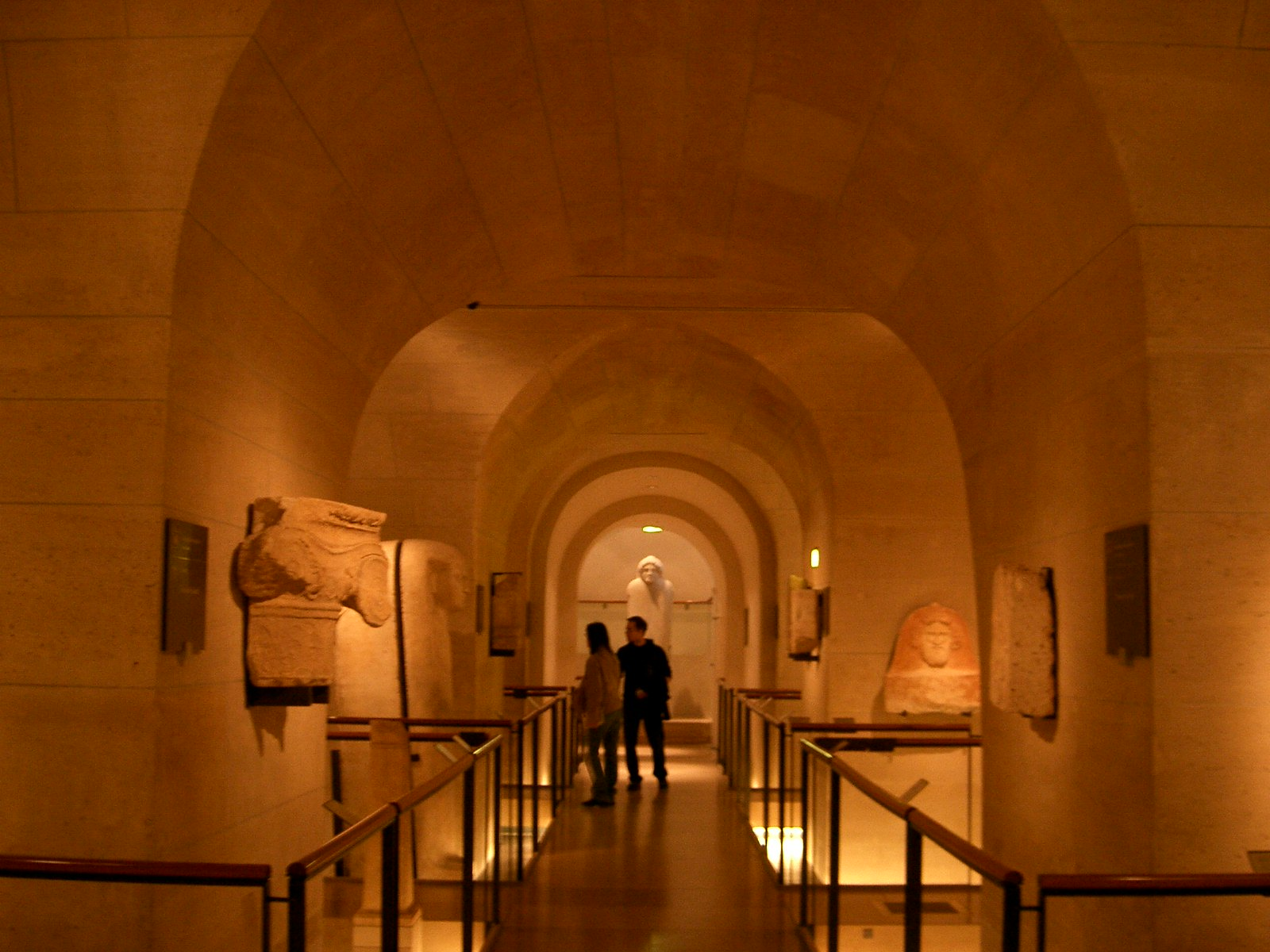
The Louvre; the ionic capital on the left is from Umm al-Amad

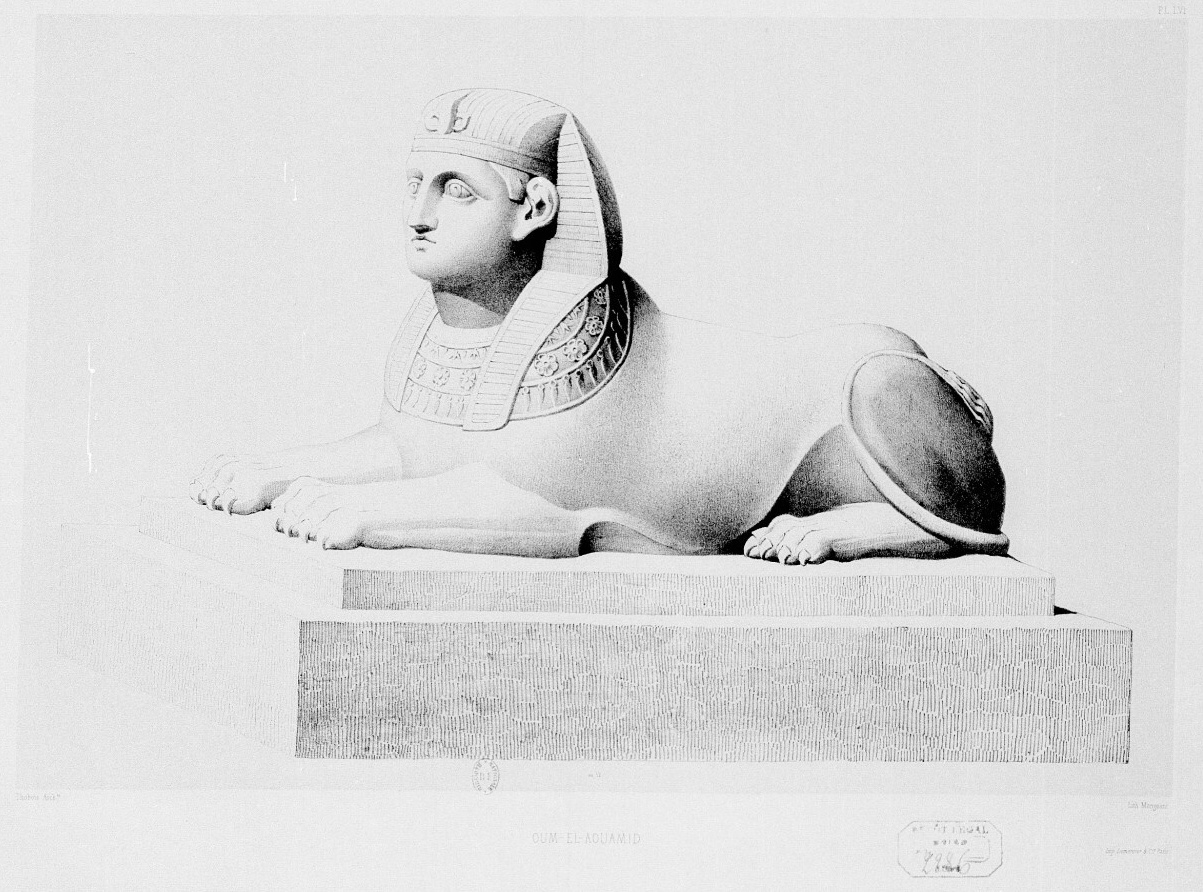
Reconstruction of a sphinx found in Umm al-Amad

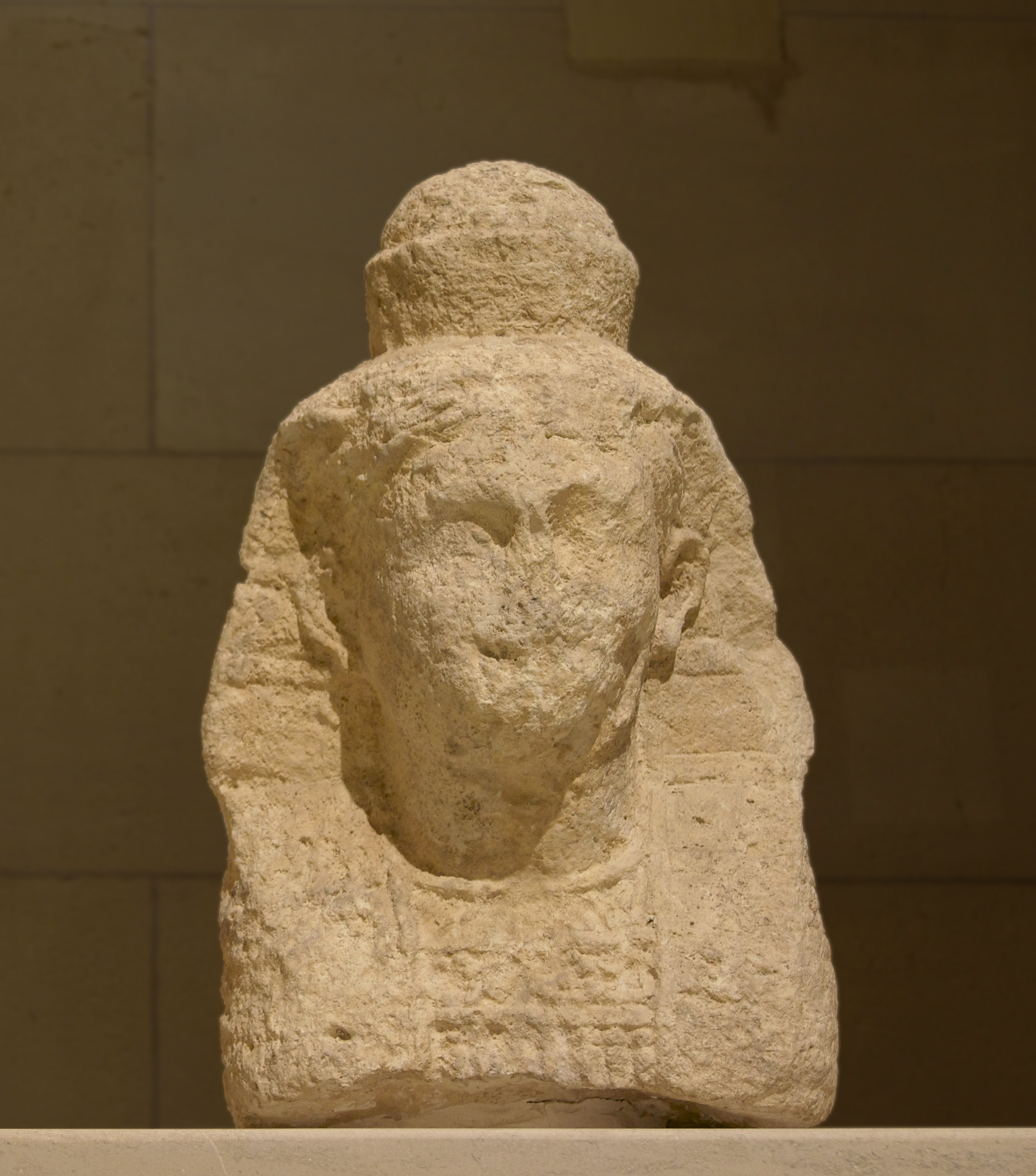
Sphinx head from a Throne of Astarte

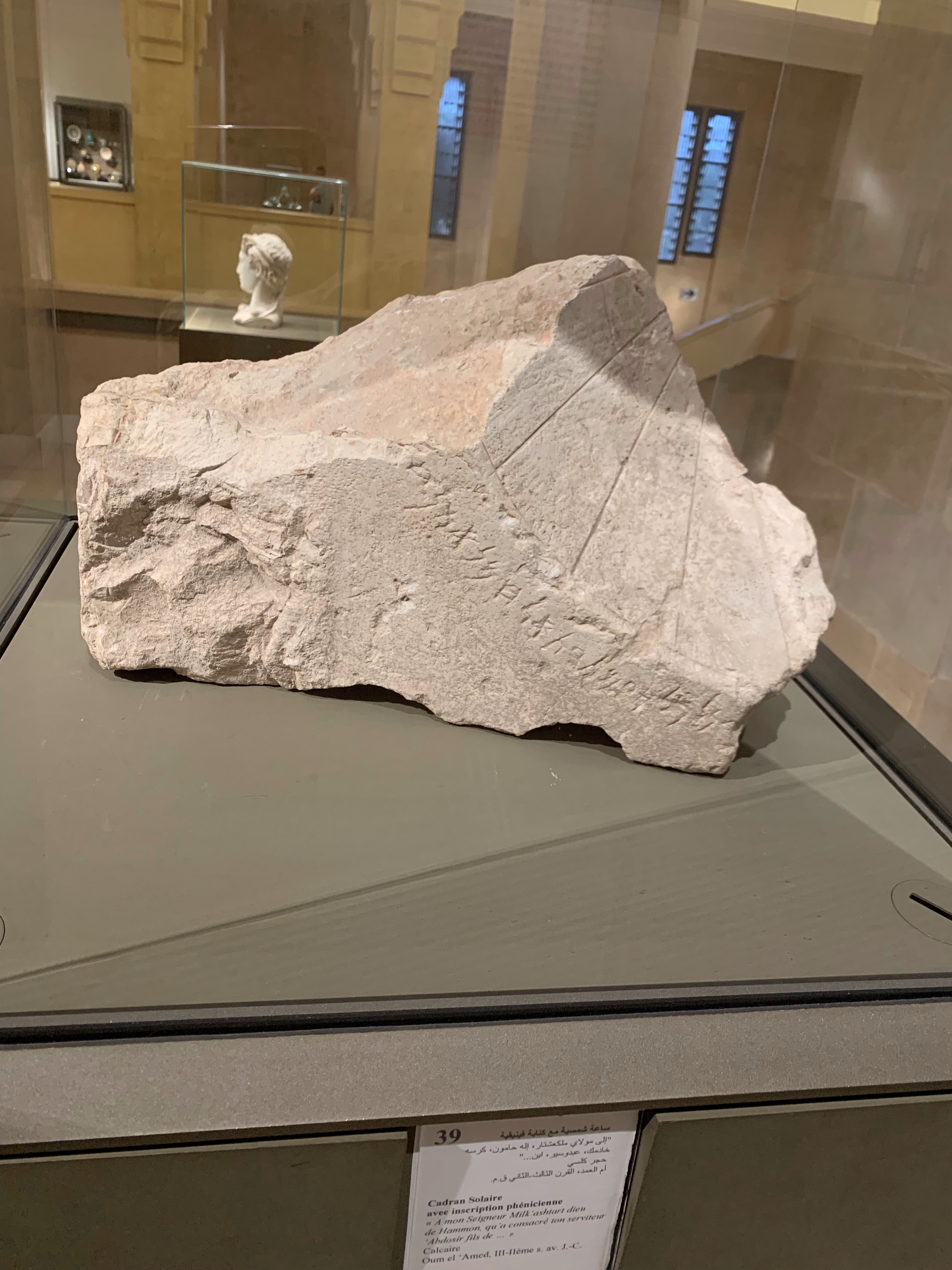
Phoenician sun dial

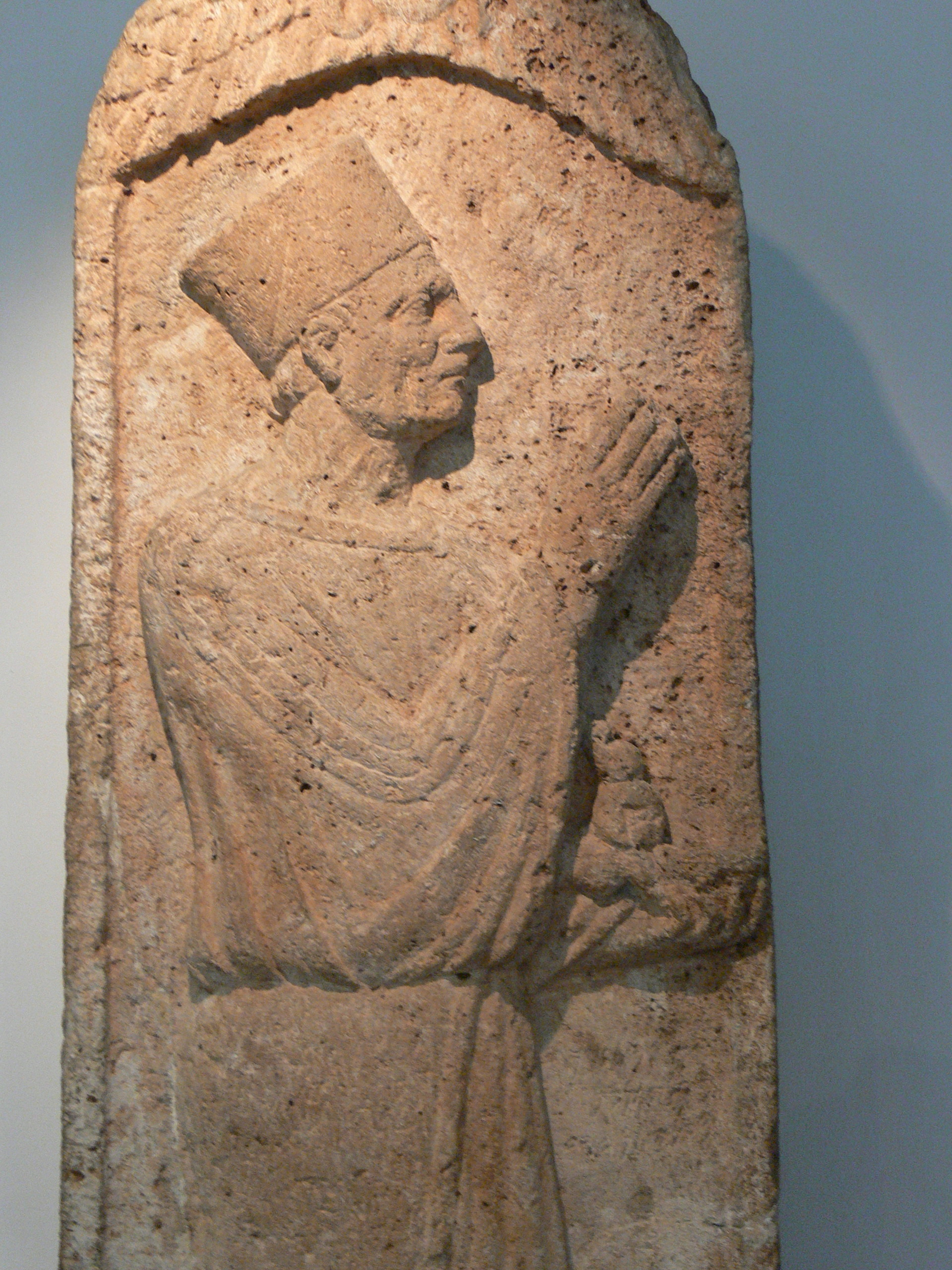
Funerary stele of "Baalyaton" from the Ny Carlsberg Glyptotek.

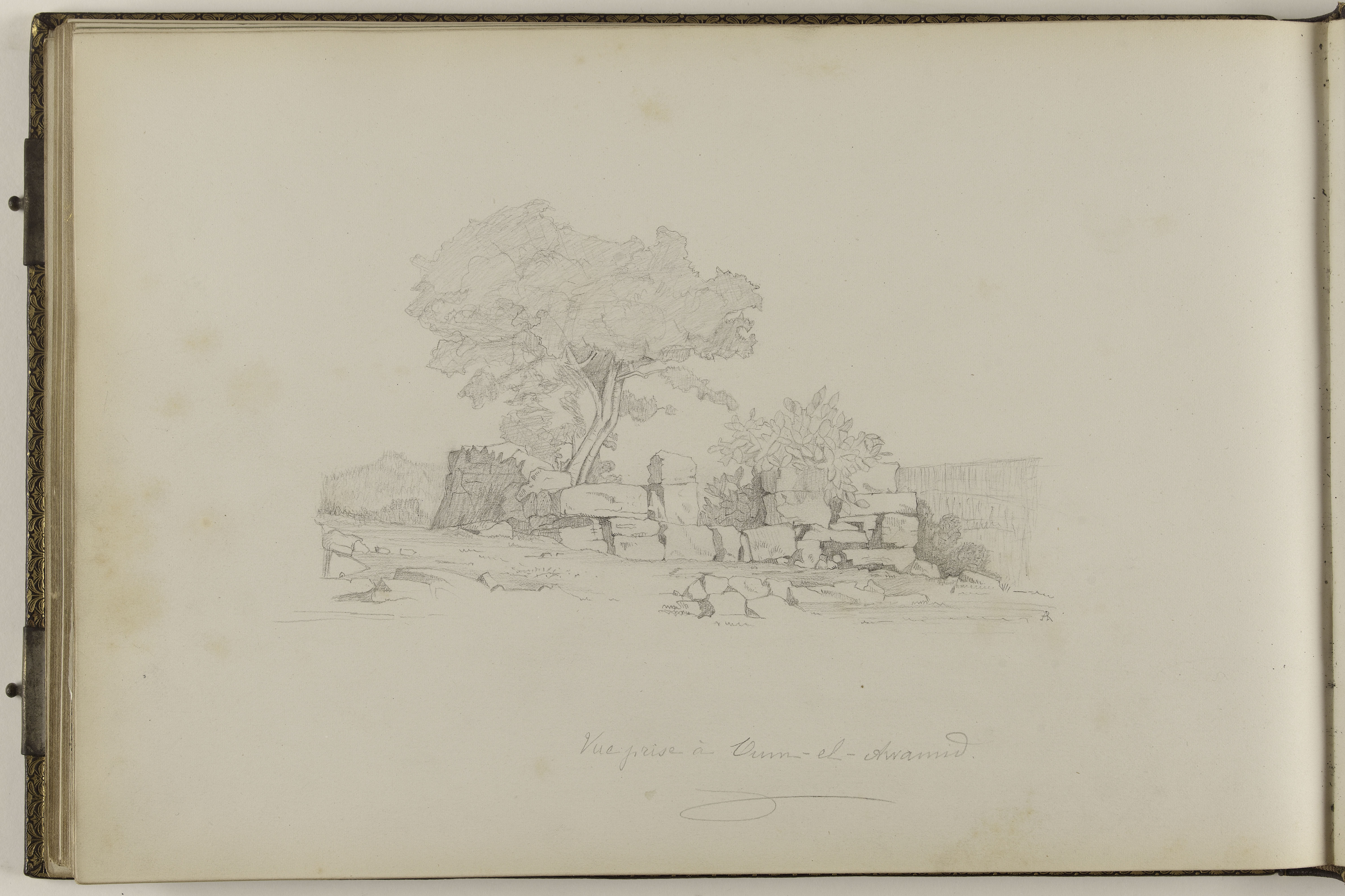
Ary Renan's A view in Umm al-Amad (Umm al-Awamid in the sketch)

== General sources ==
- Clermont-Ganneau, C. S., "La stele phenicienne d'umm el-'Aouamid", Recueil d'archéologie orientale, volume V, 1902, pp. 1–8
- Conder, C. R.; Kitchener, H.H. (1881). The Survey of Western Palestine: Memoirs of the Topography, Orography, Hydrography, and Archaeology. Vol. 1. London: Committee of the Palestine Exploration Fund. pp. 181–184.
- Dunand, M.; Duru, Raymond (1962). Oumm el-ʾAmed: une ville de l'époque hellénistique aux échelles de Tyr. Librairie d'Amérique et d'Orient.
- Guérin, V. (1880). Description Géographique Historique et Archéologique de la Palestine (in French). Vol. 3: Galilee, pt. 2. Paris: L'Imprimerie Nationale. p. 173.
- Michelau, H., 2014: "Hellenistische Stelen mit Kultakteuren aus Umm el-'Amed", ZDPV 130: 77–95, Taf. 3–11
- Palmer, E. H. (1881). The Survey of Western Palestine: Arabic and English Name Lists Collected During the Survey by Lieutenants Conder and Kitchener, R. E. Transliterated and Explained by E. H. Palmer. Committee of the Palestine Exploration Fund. p. 50 ("the ruin with the columns").
- Vella, Nicholas, "Defining Phoenician Religious Space: Oumm el-'Amed Reconsidered", Ancient Near Eastern Studies, volume 37, 2000, pp. 27–55, doi:10.2143/ANES.37.0.1081.
