= Old Aramaic =

Earliest stage of the Aramaic language

- Ancient Aramaic
- Region: Fertile Crescent (northern and western Syria, Lebanon, Israel/Palestine, Egypt (Sinai), Jordan, Iraq, southern Turkey), northern Arabia (Bahrain)
- Era: Iron Age and classical antiquity (c. 900–750 BCE), evolved into Imperial Aramaic (c. 750–300 BCE)
- Language family: Afro-Asiatic: Semitic; West Semitic; Central Semitic; Northwest Semitic; Old Aramaic
- Early form: Proto-Semitic
- Dialects: Samalian
- Writing system: Phoenician alphabet Aramaic alphabet

Language codes
- ISO 639-3: oar
- Glottolog: olda1245

Old Aramaic refers to the earliest stage of the Aramaic language, known from early Aramaic inscriptions and dated to the 10th century BCE through the 8th century BCE.

Emerging as the language of the city-states of the Arameans in the Fertile Crescent in the Early Iron Age, Old Aramaic was adopted as a lingua franca, and in this role was inherited for official use by the Achaemenid Empire during classical antiquity. After the fall of the Achaemenid Empire, local vernaculars became increasingly prominent, fanning the divergence of an Aramaic dialect continuum and the development of differing written standards.

The language is considered to have given way to Middle Aramaic by the 3rd century BCE (a conventional date is the rise of the Sasanian Empire in 224 CE).

== Ancient Aramaic ==
"Ancient Aramaic" refers to the earliest known period of the language, from its origin until it becomes the lingua franca of the Fertile Crescent and Bahrain. It was the language of the Aramaean city-states of Damascus, Guzana, Hamath and Arpad (all in modern-day Syria). Distinctive royal inscriptions at Sam'al have been interpreted by some scholars as a distinctive variant of Old Aramaic, by others as an independent but closely related Samalian language.

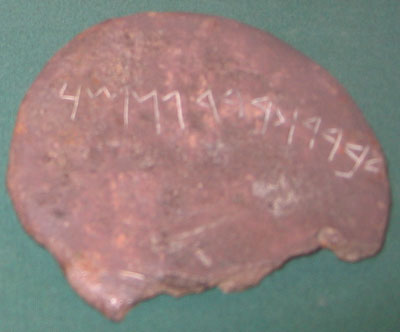
Silver ingot of Bar-Rakib, son of Panammuwa II, King of Sam‘al (now called Zincirli Höyük)

There are inscriptions that evidence the earliest use of the language, dating from the ninth and eighth century BCE. The inscriptions are mostly diplomatic documents between Aramaean city-states. The alphabet of Aramaic then seems to be based on the Phoenician alphabet, and there is a unity in the written language. It seems that in time, a more refined alphabet, suited to the needs of the language, began to develop from this in the eastern regions of Aram. The dominance of the Neo-Assyrian Empire under Tiglath-Pileser III over Aram-Damascus in the middle of the 8th century led to the establishment of Aramaic as a lingua franca of the empire, rather than it being eclipsed by Akkadian.

From 700 BCE, the language began to spread in all directions but lost much of its homogeneity. Different dialects emerged in Assyria, Babylonia, the Levant and Egypt. However, the Akkadian-influenced Aramaic of Assyria, and then Babylon, started to come to the fore. As described in 2 Kings 18:26, envoys of Hezekiah, king of Judah, ask to negotiate with Assyrian military commanders in Aramaic so that the common people would not understand. Around 600 BCE, Adon, a Canaanite king, used Aramaic to write to the Egyptian Pharaoh.

The first Old Aramaic inscription found in Europe, but originally from (Ptolemaic?) Egypt, is the Carpentras Stele, published by Rigord in 1704.

== Imperial Aramaic ==
After 539 BCE, following the Achaemenid conquest of Mesopotamia under Darius I, the Achaemenids adopted the local use of Aramaic.

When the Achaemenids extended their rule westward, they adopted this language as the vehicle for written communication between the various regions of the vast empire with its different peoples and languages. The use of a single official language, which modern scholarship has dubbed Official Aramaic or Imperial Aramaic, can be assumed to have greatly contributed to the astonishing success of the Achaemenids in holding their far-flung empire together for as long as they did.

The term "Imperial Aramaic", originally German "Reichsaramäisch", was coined by Josef Markwart in 1927.

In 1955, Richard Frye questioned the classification of Imperial Aramaic as an "official language", noting that no surviving edict expressly and unambiguously accorded that status to any particular language. Frye reclassifies Imperial Aramaic as the lingua franca of Achaemenid territories, suggesting then that the Achaemenid-era use of Aramaic was more pervasive than generally thought.

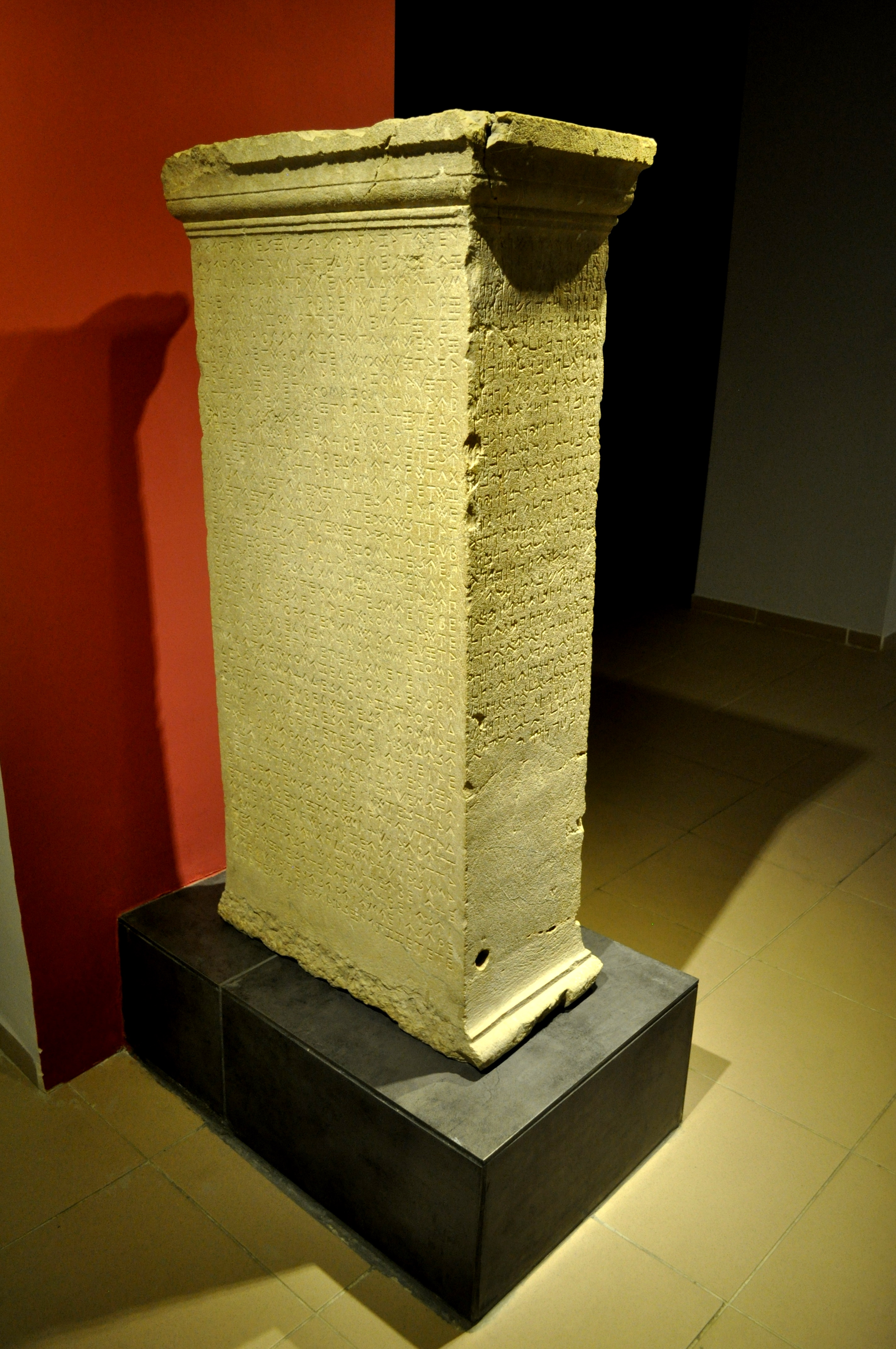
The 4th century BCE Letoon trilingual uses Greek, Lycian and Aramaic. Fethiye Museum.

Imperial Aramaic was highly standardised; its orthography was based more on historical roots than any spoken dialect, and the inevitable influence of Old Persian gave the language a new clarity and robust flexibility. For centuries after the fall of the Achaemenid Empire (in 331 BCE), Imperial Aramaic or a similar dialect would remain an influence on the various native Iranian languages. Aramaic script and, as ideograms, Aramaic vocabulary would survive as the essential characteristics of the Pahlavi scripts.

One of the largest collections of Imperial Aramaic texts is that of the Persepolis fortification tablets, which number about five hundred. Many of the extant documents witnessing to this form of Aramaic come from Egypt, Elephantine in particular (see: Elephantine papyri). Of them, the best known is the Wisdom of Ahiqar, a book of instructive aphorisms quite similar in style to the biblical Book of Proverbs. In addition, current consensus regards the Aramaic portion of the Biblical book of Daniel (i.e., 2:4b-7:28) as an example of Imperial (Official) Aramaic.

Achaemenid Aramaic is sufficiently uniform that it is often difficult to know where any particular example of the language was written. Only careful examination reveals the occasional loanword from a local language.

A group of thirty Aramaic documents from Bactria has been discovered, now forming the Khalili Collection of Aramaic Documents, and an analysis was published in November 2006. The texts, which were rendered on leather, reflect the use of Aramaic in the fourth century BCE Achaemenid administration of Bactria and Sogdia.

Old Aramaic and Biblical Hebrew both form part of the group of Northwest Semitic languages, and during antiquity, there may still have been substantial mutual intelligibility. In Tractate Pesahim of the Babylonian Talmud, Hanina bar Hama said that God sent the exiled Jews to Babylon because "their language [Aramaic] is close to the language of the Torah [Hebrew]".

== Biblical Aramaic ==
Biblical Aramaic is the term for the Aramaic passages, written in Aramaic square script, interspersed in the Hebrew Bible. These passages make for a small fraction of the entire text (of the order of 1%), and most of it is due to the Aramaic parts of the Book of Daniel:

- Genesis 31:47 – translation of a Hebrew place-name.
- Ezra 4:8–6:18 and 7:12–26 – documents from the Achaemenid period (5th century BCE) concerning the restoration of the temple in Jerusalem.
- Jeremiah 10:11 – a single sentence in the middle of a Hebrew text denouncing idolatry.
- Daniel 2:4b–7:28 – five subversive tales and an apocalyptic vision.

Biblical Aramaic presented several challenges for later writers who were engaged in early Biblical studies. Since the time of Jerome of Stridon (d. 420), Biblical Aramaic was misnamed as "Chaldean" (Chaldaic, Chaldee). That label remained common in early Aramaic studies, and persisted up into the nineteenth century. The "Chaldean misnomer" was eventually abandoned, when modern researchers showed that Aramaic dialect used in Hebrew Bible was not related with ancient Chaldeans and their language.

Biblical Aramaic is a somewhat hybrid dialect. It is theorized that some Biblical Aramaic material originated in both Babylonia and Judaea before the fall of the Achaemenid dynasty.

== Post-Achaemenid Aramaic ==
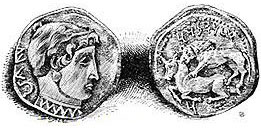
Coin of Alexander the Great bearing an Aramaic language inscription

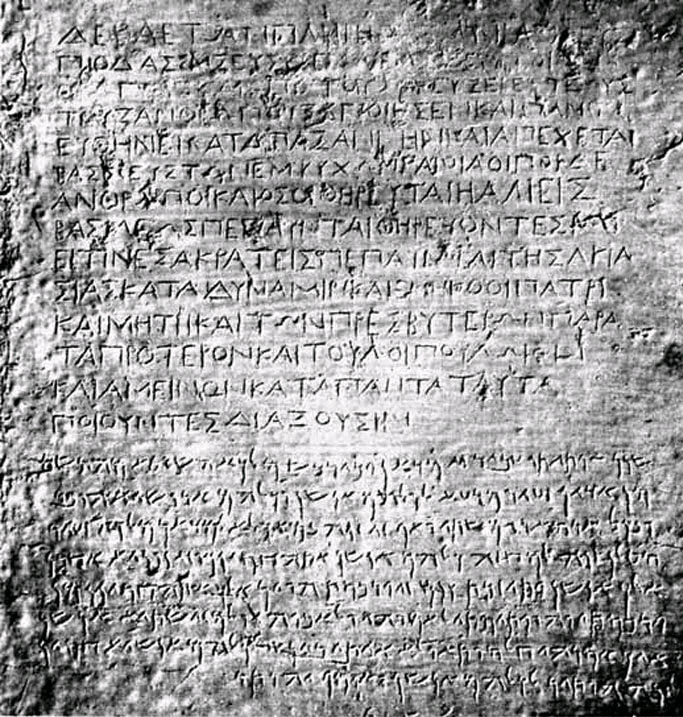
Bilingual inscription (Greek and Aramaic) by Ashoka, third century BCE at Kandahar, Afghanistan

The conquest by Alexander the Great did not destroy the unity of Aramaic language and literature immediately. Aramaic that bears a relatively close resemblance to that of the fifth century BCE can be found right up to the early second century BCE. The Seleucids imposed Koine Greek in the administration of Syria and Mesopotamia from the start of their rule. In the third century BCE, Koine Greek overtook Aramaic as the common language in Egypt and Syria. However, a post-Achaemenid Aramaic continued to flourish from Judea, Assyria, Mesopotamia, through the Syrian Desert and into northern Arabia and Parthia.

Under the category of post-Achaemenid is Hasmonaean Aramaic, the official language of the Hasmonean dynasty of Judaea (142–37 BCE). It influenced the Aramaic of the Qumran texts, and was the main language of non-biblical theological texts of that community. The major Targums, translations of the Hebrew Bible into Aramaic, were originally composed in Hasmonaean. Hasmonaean also appears in quotations in the Mishnah and Tosefta, although smoothed into its later context. It is written quite differently from Achaemenid Aramaic; there is an emphasis on writing as words are pronounced rather than using etymological forms.

Babylonian Targumic is the later post-Achaemenid dialect found in the Targum Onqelos and Targum Jonathan, the "official" targums. The original, Hasmonaean targums had reached Babylon sometime in the 2nd or 3rd century CE. They were then reworked according to the contemporary dialect of Babylon to create the language of the standard targums. This combination formed the basis of Babylonian Jewish literature for centuries to follow.

Galilean Targumic is similar to Babylonian Targumic. It is the mixing of literary Hasmonaean with the dialect of Galilee. The Hasmonaean targums reached Galilee in the 2nd century, and were reworked into this Galilean dialect for local use. The Galilean Targum was not considered an authoritative work by other communities, and documentary evidence shows that its text was amended. From the 11th century onwards, once the Babylonian Targum had become normative, the Galilean version became heavily influenced by it.

Babylonian Documentary Aramaic is a dialect in use from the 3rd century onwards. It is the dialect of Babylonian private documents, and, from the 12th century, all Jewish private documents are in Aramaic. It is based on Hasmonaean with very few changes. This was perhaps because many of the documents in BDA are legal documents, the language in them had to be sensible throughout the Jewish community from the start, and Hasmonaean was the old standard.

The Nabataean language was the Western Aramaic variety used by the Nabateans of the Negev, including the kingdom of Petra. The kingdom (c. 200 BCE – 106 CE) covered the east bank of the Jordan River, the Sinai Peninsula and northern Arabia. Perhaps because of the importance of the caravan trade, the Nabataeans began to use Aramaic in preference to Ancient North Arabian. The dialect is based on Achaemenid with a little influence from Arabic: "l" is often turned into "n", and there are a few Arabic loan words. Some Nabataean Aramaic inscriptions exist from the early days of the kingdom, but most are from the first four centuries CE. The language is written in a cursive script that is the precursor to the modern Arabic alphabet. The number of Arabic loan words increases through the centuries, until, in the 4th century, Nabataean merges seamlessly with Arabic.

Palmyrene Aramaic is the dialect that was in use in the city state of Palmyra in the Syrian Desert from 44 BCE to 274 CE. It was written in a rounded script, which later gave way to cursive Estrangela. Like Nabataean, Palmyrene was influenced by Arabic, but to a much lesser degree.

The use of written Aramaic in the Achaemenid bureaucracy also precipitated the adoption of Aramaic-derived scripts to render a number of Middle Iranian languages. Moreover, many common words, including even pronouns, particles, numerals, and auxiliaries, continued to be written as Aramaic "words" even when writing Middle Iranian languages. In time, in Iranian usage, these Aramaic "words" became disassociated from the Aramaic language and came to be understood as signs (i.e. logograms), much like the sign ⟨&⟩ is read as "and" in English and the original Latin et is now no longer obvious.

Under the early third-century BCE Parthian Empire, whose government used Koine Greek but whose native language was Parthian, the Parthian language and the Aramaic-derived writing system used for Parthian both gained prestige. This in turn influenced the adoption of the name pahlavi (< parthawi, "of the Parthians") for their use of Aramaic script with logograms. The Sasanian Empire, which succeeded the Parthian Arsacids in the mid-3rd century CE, subsequently inherited/adopted the Parthian-mediated Aramaic-derived writing system for their own Middle Iranian ethnolect as well. That particular Middle Iranian dialect, Middle Persian, i.e. the language of Persia proper, subsequently also became a prestige language. Following the Muslim conquest of Persia by the Arabs in the seventh-century, the Aramaic-derived writing system was replaced by the Arabic script in all but Zoroastrian usage, which continued to use the name pahlavi for the Aramaic-derived writing system and went on to create the bulk of all Middle Iranian literature in that writing system.

== Late Old Eastern Aramaic ==
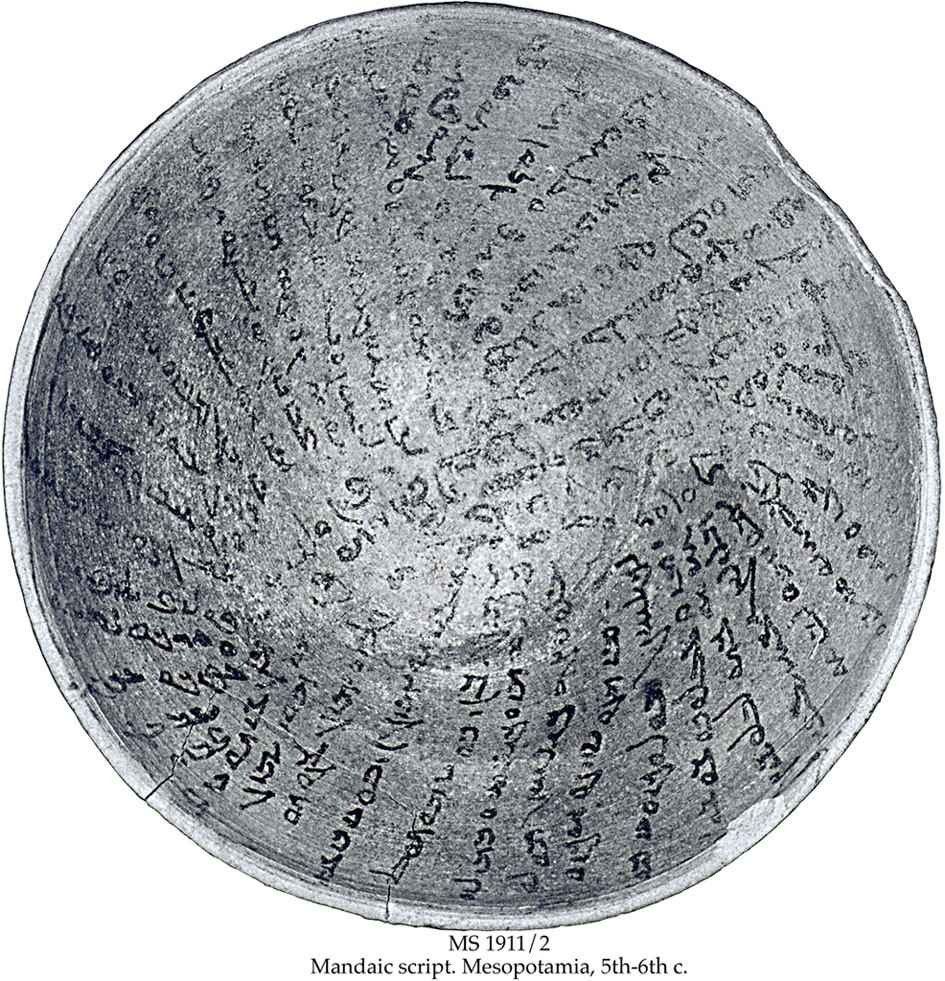
Mandaic magical "demon trap"

The dialects mentioned in the last section were all descended from Achaemenid Imperial Aramaic. However, the diverse regional dialects of Late Ancient Aramaic continued alongside them, often as simple, spoken languages. Early evidence for these spoken dialects is known only through their influence on words and names in a more standard dialect. However, the regional dialects became written languages in the 2nd century BCE and reflect a stream of Aramaic that is not dependent on Imperial Aramaic. They show a clear division between the regions of Mesopotamia, Babylon and the east, and Judah, Syria, and the west.

In the East, the dialects of Palmyrene and Arsacid Aramaic merged with the regional languages to create languages with a foot in Imperial and a foot in regional Aramaic. The written form of Mandaic, the language of the Mandaean religion, was descended from the Arsacid chancery script.

In the kingdom of Osroene, centred on Edessa and founded in 132 BCE, Aramaic was the official language, and local dialect gradually developed into a language of wider regional significance, known as the Edessan Aramaic, and later (since the 5th century CE) specifically labeled as the Syriac language.

On the upper reaches of the Tigris, East Mesopotamian Aramaic flourished, with evidence from Hatra, Assur and the Tur Abdin. Tatian, the author of the gospel harmony known as the Diatessaron, came from the Seleucid Empire and perhaps wrote his work (172 CE) in East Mesopotamian rather than Edessan Aramaic or Greek. In Babylonia, the regional dialect was used by the Jewish community, Jewish Old Babylonian (c. 70 CE). The everyday language increasingly came under the influence of Biblical Aramaic and Babylonian Targumic.

== Late Old Western Aramaic ==
The western regional dialects of Aramaic followed a similar course to those of the east. They are quite distinct from the eastern dialects and Imperial Aramaic. Aramaic came to coexist with Canaanite dialects, eventually completely displacing Phoenician and Hebrew around the turn of the 4th century CE.

The form of Late Old Western Aramaic used by the Jewish community is best attested, and is usually referred to as Jewish Old Palestinian. Its oldest form is Old East Jordanian, which probably comes from the region of Caesarea Philippi. This is the dialect of the oldest manuscript of the Book of Enoch (c. 170 BCE). The next distinct phase of the language is called Old Judaean into the 2nd century CE. Old Judaean literature can be found in various inscriptions and personal letters, preserved quotations in the Talmud and receipts from Qumran. Josephus' first, non-extant edition of his The Jewish War was written in Old Judaean.

The Old East Jordanian dialect continued to be used into the 1st century CE by pagan communities living to the east of the Jordan. Their dialect is often then called Pagan Old Palestinian, and it was written in a cursive script somewhat similar to that used for Old Edessan Aramaic. A Christian Old Palestinian dialect may have arisen from the pagan one, and this dialect may be behind some of the Western Aramaic tendencies found in the otherwise eastern Old Edessan Aramaic gospels (see Middle Aramaic versions of the Bible).

In the 1st century CE, Jews in Roman Judaea primarily spoke Aramaic (besides Koine Greek as the international language of the Roman administration and trade). In addition to the formal, literary dialects of Aramaic based on Hasmonaean and Babylonian there were a number of colloquial Aramaic dialects. Seven dialects of Western Aramaic were spoken in the vicinity of Judaea in Jesus' time. They were probably distinctive yet mutually intelligible. Old Judaean was the prominent dialect of Jerusalem and Judaea. The region of Ein Gedi had the Southeastern Judaean dialect. Samaria had its distinctive Samaritan Aramaic, where the consonants he, heth and ayin all became pronounced the same as aleph, presumably a glottal stop. Galilean Aramaic, the dialect of Jesus' home region, is only known from a few place names, the influences on Galilean Targumic, some rabbinic literature and a few private letters. It seems to have a number of distinctive features: diphthongs are never simplified into monophthongs. East of the Jordan, the various dialects of East Jordanian were spoken. In the region of Damascus and the Anti-Lebanon Mountains, Damascene Aramaic was spoken (deduced mostly from Modern Western Aramaic). Finally, as far north as Aleppo, the western dialect of Orontes Aramaic was spoken.

The three languages influenced one another, especially Hebrew and Aramaic. Hebrew words entered Jewish Aramaic (mostly technical religious words but also everyday words like ‘ēṣ "wood"). Vice versa, Aramaic words entered Hebrew (not only Aramaic words like māmmôn "wealth" but Aramaic ways of using words like making Hebrew rā’ûi, "seen" mean "worthy" in the sense of "seemly", which is a loan translation of Aramaic ḥāzê meaning "seen" and "worthy").

The Greek of the New Testament often preserves non-Greek semiticisms, including transliterations of Semitic words:

- Some are Aramaic like talitha (ταλιθα) that can represent the noun ṭalyĕṯā (Mark 5:41).
- Others can be either Hebrew or Aramaic like Rabbounei (Ραββουνει), which stands for "my master/great one/teacher" in both languages (John 20:16).

== Sources ==
- Beyer, Klaus (1986). The Aramaic Language: Its Distribution and Subdivisions. Göttingen: Vandenhoeck & Ruprecht. ISBN 9783525535738.
- Brock, Sebastian P. (1989). "Three Thousand Years of Aramaic Literature". ARAM Periodical. 1 (1): 11–23.
- Collins, John J. (1993). "The Aramaic of Daniel in the Light of Old Aramaic, by Zdravko Stefanovic". Journal of Biblical Literature. 112 (4): 710–712. doi:10.2307/3267414. JSTOR 3267414.
- Davies, Benjamin (1872). A Compendious and Complete Hebrew and Chaldee Lexicon to the Old Testament. London: Asher.
- Fürst, Julius (1867). A Hebrew & Chaldee Lexicon to the Old Testament: With an Introduction Giving a Short History of Hebrew Lexicography. London: Williams & Norgate.
- Gallagher, Edmon L. (2012). Hebrew Scripture in Patristic Biblical Theory: Canon, Language, Text. Leiden-Boston: Brill. ISBN 9789004228023.
- Gesenius, Wilhelm; Prideaux-Tregelles, Samuel (1859). Gesenius's Hebrew and Chaldee Lexicon to the Old Testament Scriptures. London: Bagster.
- Gzella, Holger (2015). A Cultural History of Aramaic: From the Beginnings to the Advent of Islam. Leiden-Boston: Brill. ISBN 9789004285101.
- Healey, John F. (2007). "The Edessan Milieu and the Birth of Syriac" (PDF). Hugoye: Journal of Syriac Studies. 10 (2): 115–127.
- Kautzsch, Emil F. (1884a). Grammatik des Biblisch-Aramäischen: Mit einer Kritischen Erörterung der aramäischen Wörter im Neuen Testament. Leipzig: Vogel.
- Kautzsch, Emil F. (1884b). "The Aramaic Language". Hebraica. 1 (1–2): 98–115. doi:10.1086/368803. JSTOR 527111.
- Kautzsch, Emil F. (1902). Die Aramaismen im Alten Testament untersucht. Halle: Niemeyer.
- Kitchen, Kenneth A. (1965). "The Aramaic of Daniel" ( (PDF)). Notes on Some Problems in the Book of Daniel. London: Tyndale Press. pp. 31–79. Archived from the original on 2020-10-31.
- Lipiński, Edward (2000). The Aramaeans: Their Ancient History, Culture, Religion. Leuven: Peeters Publishers. ISBN 9789042908598.
- T. Muraoka & B. Porten (2004). A Grammar of Egyptian Aramaic. Handbook of Oriental Studies, The Near and Middle East. Brill.
- Nöldeke, Theodor (1871). "Die Namen der aramäischen Nation und Sprache". Zeitschrift der Deutschen Morgenländischen Gesellschaft. 25 (1–2): 113–131. JSTOR 43366019.
- Franz Rosenthal (1995). A Grammar of Biblical Aramaic. 6th revised edition. Wiesbaden: Otto Harrassowitz.
- Stefanovic, Zdravko (1992). The Aramaic of Daniel in the Light of Old Aramaic. Sheffield: Sheffield Academic Press. ISBN 9780567132543.
- Younger, Kenneth Lawson (2016). A Political History of the Arameans: From Their Origins to the End of Their Polities. Atlanta: SBL Press. ISBN 9781628370843.
