= Imperial Aramaic =

Ancient language

- Official/Standard Aramaic
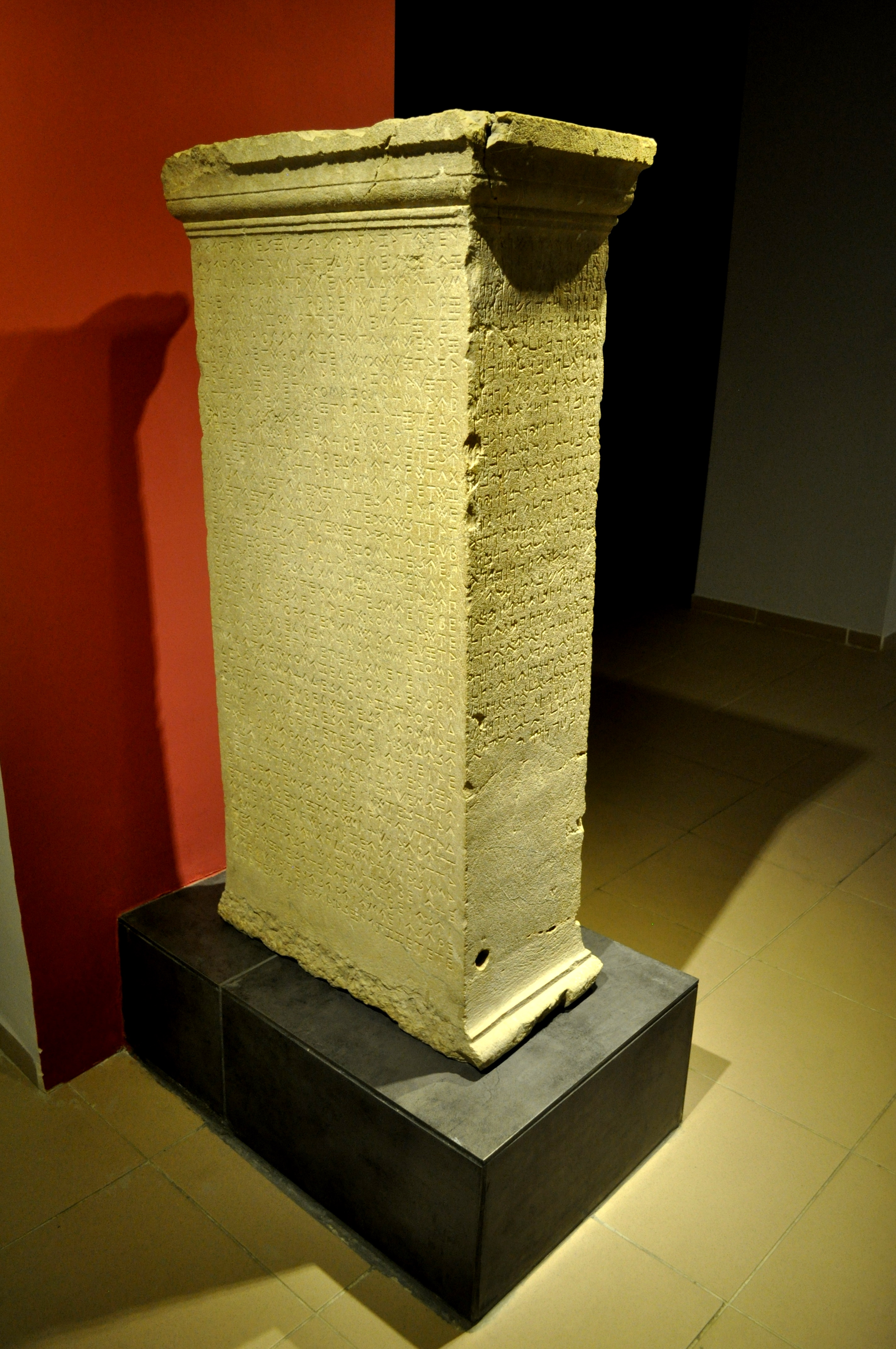
- Letoon Trilingual with Greek, Lycian and Aramaic. Fethiye Museum, 4th century BC.
- Region: Ancient Near East
- Era: c. 750–300 BC, evolved into Biblical Aramaic then split into Middle Aramaic (c. 200–1200), or Old Syriac then Classical Syriac
- Language family: Afro-Asiatic: Semitic; West Semitic; Central Semitic; Northwest Semitic; Aramaic; Imperial Aramaic
- Early form: Old Aramaic
- Writing system: Aramaic alphabet

Language codes
- ISO 639-2: arc
- ISO 639-3: arc
- Glottolog: impe1235

Imperial Aramaic is a linguistic term, coined by modern scholars in order to designate a specific historical variety of Aramaic. The term is polysemic, with two distinctive meanings, wider (sociolinguistic) and narrower (dialectological). Since most surviving examples of the language have been found in Egypt, the language is also referred to as Egyptian Aramaic.

Some scholars use the term as a designation for a distinctive, socially prominent phase in the history of Aramaic language, that lasted from the middle of the 8th century BCE to the end of the 4th century BCE and was marked by the use of Aramaic as a language of public life and administration in the late Neo-Assyrian Empire and its successor states, the Neo-Babylonian Empire and the Achaemenid Empire, also adding to that some later (Post-Imperial) uses that persisted throughout the early Hellenistic period. Other scholars use the term Imperial Aramaic in a narrower sense, reduced only to the Achaemenid period, basing that reduction on several strictly linguistic distinctions between the previous (Neo-Assyrian and Neo-Babylonian) phase and later (more prominent) Achaemenid phase.

Since all of those phases can be semantically labelled as "imperial", some scholars opt for the use of more specific and unambiguous terms, like Neo-Assyrian Aramaic and Neo-Babylonian Aramaic (for the older phases), and Achaemenid Aramaic (for the later phase), thus avoiding the use of the polysemic "imperial" label, and its primarily sociolinguistic implications. Similar issues have arisen in relation to the uses of some alternative terms, like Official Aramaic or Standard Aramaic, that were also criticized as unspecific. All of those terms continue to be used differently by scholars.

The Elephantine papyri and ostraca, as well as other Egyptian texts, are the largest group of extant records in the language, collected in the standard Textbook of Aramaic Documents from Ancient Egypt. Outside of Egypt, most texts are known from stone or pottery inscriptions spread across a wide geographic area. More recently a group of leather and wooden documents were found in Bactria, known as the Bactria Aramaic documents.

== Name and classification ==
The term "Imperial Aramaic" was first coined by Josef Markwart in 1927, calling the language by the German name Reichsaramäisch. In 1955, Richard N. Frye noted that no extant edict expressly or ambiguously accorded the status of "official language" to any particular language, causing him to question the classification of Imperial Aramaic. Frye went on to reclassify Imperial Aramaic as the lingua franca used in the territories of the Achaemenid Empire, further suggesting that the language's use was more prevalent in these areas than initially thought.

== History ==
The native speakers of Aramaic, the Arameans, settled in great numbers in Babylonia and Upper Mesopotamia during the ages of the Neo-Assyrian and Neo-Babylonian Empires. The massive influx of settlers led to the adoption of Aramaic as the lingua franca of the Neo-Assyrian Empire. After the Achaemenid conquest of Mesopotamia in 539 BC, the Achaemenids continued the use of Aramaic as the language of the region, further extending its prevalence by making it the imperial standard (thus "Imperial" Aramaic) so it may be the "vehicle for written communication between the different regions of the vast empire with its different peoples and languages." The adoption of a single official language for the various regions of the empire has been cited as a reason for the at the time unprecedented success of the Achaemenids in maintaining the expanse of their empire for a period of centuries.

== Sources ==
One of the most extensive collections of texts written in Imperial Aramaic is the Fortification Tablets of Persepolis, of which there are about five hundred. Other extant examples of Imperial Aramaic come from Egypt, such as the Elephantine papyri. Egyptian examples also include the Words of Ahikar, a piece of wisdom literature reminiscent of the Book of Proverbs. Scholarly consensus regards the portions of the Book of Daniel (i.e., 2:4b-7:28) written in Aramaic as an example of Imperial Aramaic. In November 2006, an analysis was published of thirty newly discovered Aramaic documents from Bactria which now constitute the Khalili Collection of Aramaic Documents. The leather parchment contains texts written in Imperial Aramaic, reflecting the use of the language for Achaemenid administrative purposes during the fourth century in regions such as Bactria and Sogdia.

== Legacy and influence ==
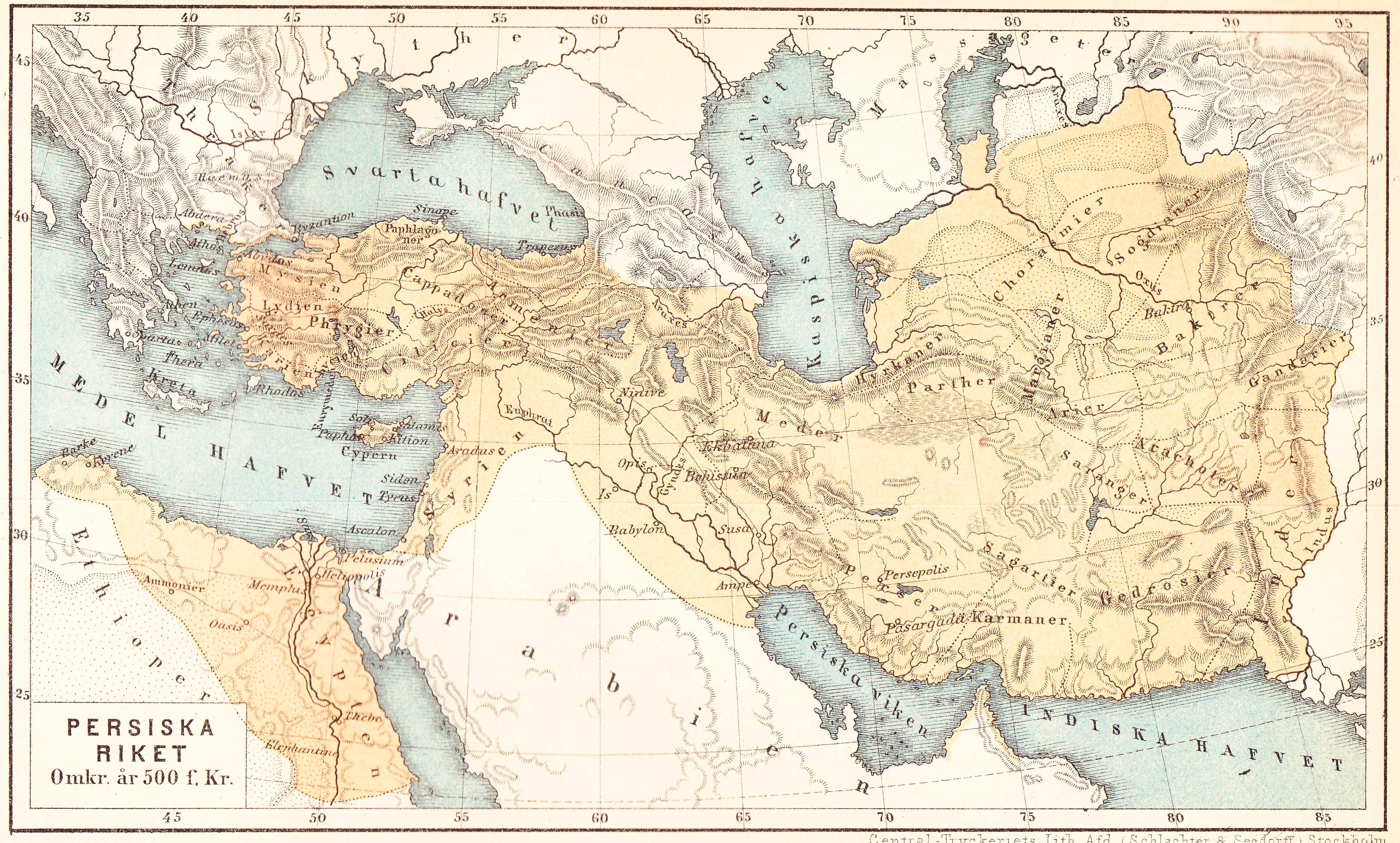
Expanse of the Achaemenid Empire, showing the regions heavily influenced by Imperial Aramaic.

The evolution of alphabets from the Mediterranean region is commonly split into two major divisions: the Phoenician-derived alphabets of the West, including the Mediterranean region (Anatolia, Greece, and the Italian Peninsula), and the Aramaic-derived alphabets of the East, including the Levant, Persia, Central Asia, and the Indian subcontinent. The former Phoenician-derived alphabets arose around the 8th century BC, and the latter Aramaic-derived alphabets evolved from the Imperial Aramaic script around the 6th century BC. After the fall of the Achaemenid Empire, the unity of the Imperial Aramaic script was lost, diversifying into a number of descendant cursives. Aramaic script and, as ideograms, Aramaic vocabulary would survive as the essential characteristics of the Pahlavi scripts, itself developing from the Manichaean alphabet.

The orthography of Imperial Aramaic was based more on its own historical roots than on any spoken dialect, leading to a high standardization of the language across the expanse of the Achaemenid Empire. Of the Imperial Aramaic glyphs extant from its era, there are two main styles: the lapidary form, often inscribed on hard surfaces like stone monuments, and the cursive form. The Achaemenid Empire used both of these styles, but the cursive became much more prominent than the lapidary, causing the latter to eventually disappear by the 3rd century BC. In remote regions, the cursive versions of Aramaic evolved into the creation of the Syriac, Palmyrene and Mandaic alphabets, which themselves formed the basis of many historical Central Asian scripts, such as the Sogdian, Uyghur and Mongolian alphabets. The Brahmi script, of which the entire Brahmic family of scripts derives (including Devanagari), most likely descends from Imperial Aramaic, as the empire of Cyrus the Great brought the borders of the Persian Empire all the way to the edge of the Indian subcontinent, with Alexander the Great and his successors further linking the lands through trade.

=== Hebrew ===
The Babylonian captivity ended after Cyrus the Great conquered Babylon. The mass-prevalence of Imperial Aramaic in the region resulted in the eventual use of the Aramaic alphabet for writing Hebrew. Before the adoption of Imperial Aramaic, Hebrew was written in the Paleo-Hebrew alphabet, which, along with Aramaic, directly descended from Phoenician. Hebrew and Aramaic heavily influenced one another, with mostly religious Hebrew words (such as ‘ēṣ "wood") transferring into Aramaic and more general Aramaic vocabulary (such as māmmôn "wealth") entering the local Hebrew lexicon.

Late Old Western Aramaic, also known as Jewish Old Palestinian, is a well-attested language used by the communities of Judea, probably originating in the area of Caesarea Philippi. By the 1st century CE, the people of Roman Judaea still used Aramaic as their primary language, along with Koine Greek for commerce and administration. The oldest manuscript of the Book of Enoch (c. 170 BC) is written in the Late Old Western Aramaic dialect.

The New Testament has several non-Greek terms of Aramaic origin, such as:

- Talitha (ταλιθα) that can represent the noun ṭalyĕṯā (Mark 5:41).
- Rabbounei (Ραββουνει), which stands for "my master/great one/teacher" in both Hebrew and Aramaic (John 20:16).

=== Nabataean Aramaic ===
Instead of using their native Arabic, the Nabataeans would use Imperial Aramaic for their written communications, causing the development of Nabataean Aramaic out of Imperial Aramaic. The standardized cursive and Aramaic-derived Nabataean alphabet became the standardized form of writing Arabic for the Arabian Peninsula, evolving on its own into the alphabet of Arabic by the time of spread of Islam centuries later. Influences from Arabic were present in the Nabataean Aramaic, such as a few Arabic loanwords and how "l" is often turned into "n". After Nabataea was annexed by the Roman Empire in 106 AD, the influence of Aramaic declined in favor of Koine Greek for written communication.

=== Manichaean ===
The Manichaean abjad writing system spread from the Near East over into Central Asia, travelling as far as the Tarim Basin in what is now the People's Republic of China. Its presence in Central Asia lead to influence from the Sogdian script, which itself descends from the Syriac branch of Aramaic. The traditions of Manichaeism allege that its founding prophet, Mani, invented the Manichaean script, as well as writing the major Manichaean texts himself. The writing system evolved from the Imperial Aramaic alphabet, which was still in use during the age of Mani, i.e. the early years of the Sassanian Empire. Along with other writing systems, the Manichaean alphabet was used to write Middle Persian, and other languages which were sometimes written with it include: Parthian, Sogdian, Bactrian, and Old Uyghur.

=== Pahlavi scripts ===
The Pahlavi scripts used in the Arsacid and Sassanian Empire as well as in post-Sassanid Zoroastrian writings were derived from the Imperial Aramaic script due to its traditional use by Achaemenid scribes. Apart from the shape of the letters, these scripts contained numerous so-called Aramaeograms, i.e. spellings that had originally expressed Aramaic words phonetically, but had come to be used conventionally as logograms to denote Iranian words.

== Unicode ==
Imperial Aramaic
- Range: U+10840..U+1085F (32 code points)
- Plane: SMP
- Scripts: Imperial Aramaic
- Major alphabets: Aramaic
- Assigned: 31 code points
- Unused: 1 reserved code points

Unicode Version History
- 5.2 (2009): 31 (+31)

Unicode documentation
- Code chart ∣ Web page

Imperial Aramaic is a Unicode block containing characters for writing Aramaic during the Achaemenid Persian Empires.

Imperial Aramaic^{[1]}^{[2]} Official Unicode Consortium code chart (PDF)
	0	1	2	3	4	5	6	7	8	9	A	B	C	D	E	F
U+1084x	𐡀	𐡁	𐡂	𐡃	𐡄	𐡅	𐡆	𐡇	𐡈	𐡉	𐡊	𐡋	𐡌	𐡍	𐡎	𐡏
U+1085x	𐡐	𐡑	𐡒	𐡓	𐡔	𐡕		𐡗	𐡘	𐡙	𐡚	𐡛	𐡜	𐡝	𐡞	𐡟
Notes 1.As of Unicode version 18.0 2.Grey area indicates non-assigned code point

== Sources ==
- Bae, Chul-hyun (2004). "Aramaic as a Lingua Franca During the Persian Empire (538-333 B.C.E.)". Journal of Universal Language. 5: 1–20. doi:10.22425/jul.2004.5.1.1.
- Beyer, Klaus (1986). The Aramaic Language: Its Distribution and Subdivisions. Göttingen: Vandenhoeck & Ruprecht. ISBN 9783525535738.
- Brock, Sebastian P. (1989). "Three Thousand Years of Aramaic Literature". ARAM Periodical. 1 (1): 11–23.
- Collins, John J. (1993). "The Aramaic of Daniel in the Light of Old Aramaic, by Zdravko Stefanovic". Journal of Biblical Literature. 112 (4): 710–712. doi:10.2307/3267414. JSTOR 3267414.
- Fitzmyer, Joseph A. (1997) [1979]. A Wandering Aramean: Collected Aramaic Essays. Grand Rapids: Eerdmans. ISBN 9780802848468.
- Folmer, Margaretha (1995). The Aramaic Language in the Achaemenid Period: A Study in Linguistic Variation. Leuven: Peeters Publishers. ISBN 9789068317404.
- Folmer, Margaretha (2012). "Imperial Aramaic as an Administrative Language of the Achaemenid Period". The Semitic Languages: An International Handbook. Berlin-Boston: Walter de Gruyter. pp. 587–598. ISBN 9783110251586.
- Jastrow, Otto (2008). "Old Aramaic and Neo-Aramaic: Some Reflections on Language History". Aramaic in its Historical and Linguistic Setting. Wiesbaden: Harrassowitz Verlag. pp. 1–10. ISBN 9783447057875.
- Greenfield, Jonas C. (1985). "Aramaic in the Achaemenian Empire". The Cambridge History of Iran. Vol. 2. Cambridge: Cambridge University Press. pp. 698–713. ISBN 9780521200912.
- Gzella, Holger (2008). "Aramaic in the Parthian Period: The Arsacid Inscriptions". Aramaic in its Historical and Linguistic Setting. Wiesbaden: Harrassowitz Verlag. pp. 107–130. ISBN 9783447057875.
- Gzella, Holger (2012a). "Imperial Aramaic". The Semitic Languages: An International Handbook. Berlin-Boston: Walter de Gruyter. pp. 574–586. ISBN 9783110251586.
- Gzella, Holger (2012b). "Late Imperial Aramaic". The Semitic Languages: An International Handbook. Berlin-Boston: Walter de Gruyter. pp. 598–609. ISBN 9783110251586.
- Gzella, Holger (2015). A Cultural History of Aramaic: From the Beginnings to the Advent of Islam. Leiden-Boston: Brill. ISBN 9789004285101.
- Lipiński, Edward (2000). The Aramaeans: Their Ancient History, Culture, Religion. Leuven: Peeters Publishers. ISBN 9789042908598.
- Nöldeke, Theodor (1871). "Die Namen der aramäischen Nation und Sprache". Zeitschrift der Deutschen Morgenländischen Gesellschaft. 25 (1–2): 113–131. JSTOR 43366019.
- Stefanovic, Zdravko (1992). The Aramaic of Daniel in the Light of Old Aramaic. Sheffield: Sheffield Academic Press. ISBN 9780567132543.
- Younger, Kenneth Lawson (2016). A Political History of the Arameans: From Their Origins to the End of Their Polities. Atlanta: SBL Press. ISBN 9781628370843.
