= Aramaic inscription from al-Mal =

A short Aramaic inscription on basalt was discovered at al-Mal in Syria in 1973. The inscribed basalt block had been cut by builders for use in a modern building. The text is not entirely preserved. It was discovered and photographed by an Israeli expedition following the Yom Kippur War.

The inscription reads:

[In the month. . .,]
the year three hundred
and five, Yqym,
son of Ḥmlt, son of
Nṣrmlk,
built a temple.

The date of 305 in the Seleucid era corresponds to the year 7 or 6 BC. The name Yqym should be vocalized Yāqīm, a biblical name attested in Nabataean Aramaic and Safaitic inscriptions. Ḥmlt is Ḥamilat, also attested in Nabataean and Safaitic. These names are thus "Arabian" and may indicate "a member of a mixed Jewish-pagan population". The name Nṣrmlk is not otherwise attested. The phrase translated 'temple' may be translated 'house of god (=אלה)'.

The script of the al-Mal inscription is almost identical to Palmyrene. Its spellings, however, are more typical of Nabataean. It also contains unusual spellings found in Jewish Palestinian Aramaic and Christian Palestinian Aramaic. Joseph Naveh thought the inscription may have been carved by an Ituraean. He argued that the script was 'Seleucid Aramaic', from which Palmyrene and Syrica were developed.

Klaus Beyer classifies the language of the al-Mal inscription as 'Pagan Old Palestinian', (Note: Its descendant, Christian Old Palestinian, is only indirectly attested in certain Western Aramaic features in the Old Syriac gospels. An Aramaic gospel known to have been in use among Palestinian Christians, a copy of which was in the library of Caesarea, may be this Christian Old Palestinian text. Christian Old Palestinian is not directly related to literary Christian Palestinian Aramaic.) specifically 'Pagan Old East Jordanian'. It is the only surviving example of this dialect. Holger Gzella, however, writes that "the text is too brief and too formulaic to exhibit any linguistic peculiarities, so it remains open whether it attests to another, non-Jewish, written tradition of Aramaic during this period."
