= Khalili Collection of Aramaic Documents =

Private collection of ancient documents

The Khalili Collection of Aramaic Documents
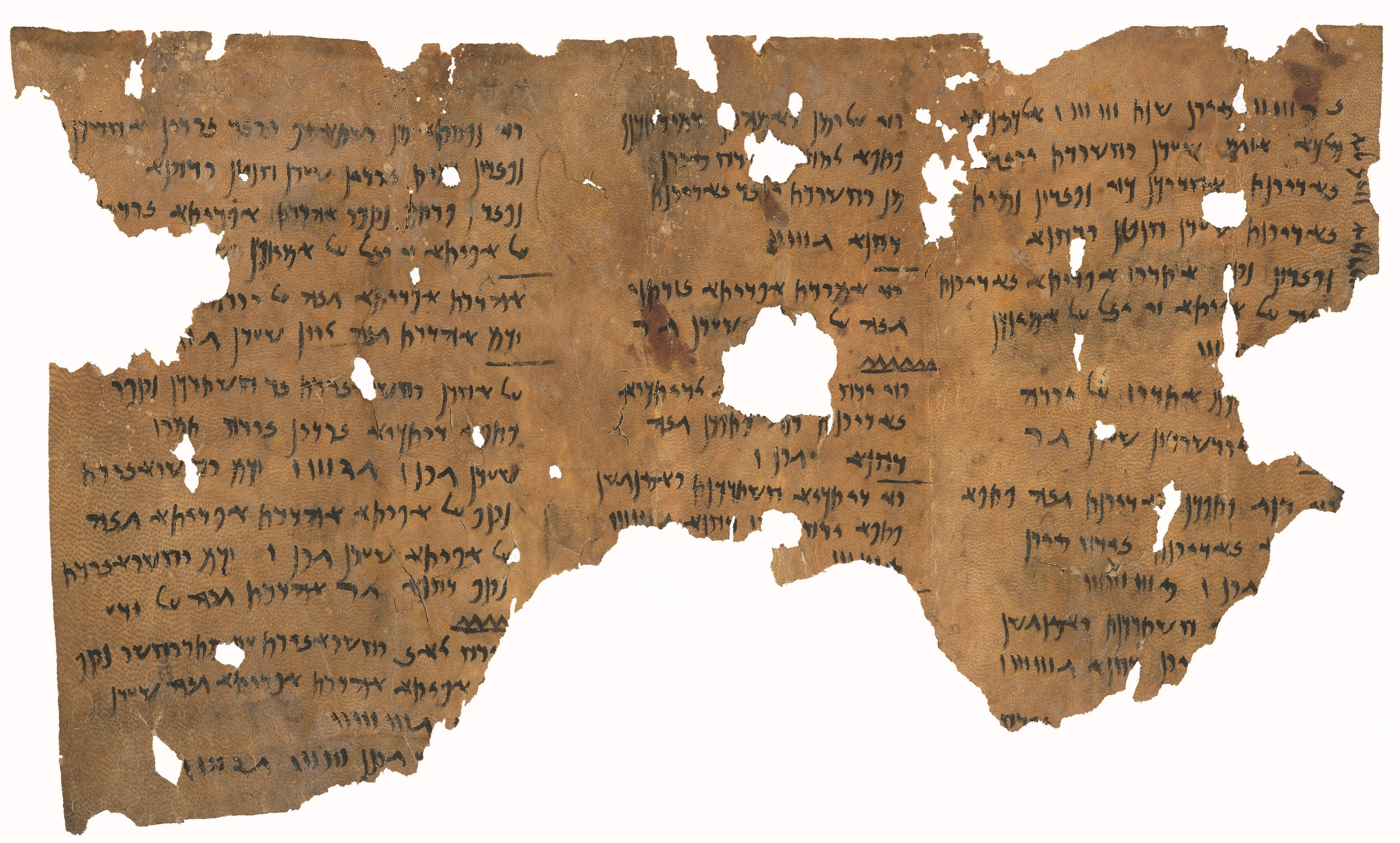
- A long list of supplies disbursed, dated the seventh year of Alexander the Great's reign, 324 BC
- Curators: Nasser D. Khalili (founder); Dror Elkvity (Curator and Chief Co-ordinator)
- Size (no. of items): 48
- Website: The Khalili Collections

The Khalili Collection of Aramaic Documents is a private collection of letters and documents from the Bactria region in present-day Afghanistan, assembled by the British collector and philanthropist Nasser D. Khalili. It is one of the Khalili Collections: eight collections of artifacts assembled, conserved, published and exhibited by Khalili.

The documents, written in Imperial Aramaic, likely originated from the historical city of Balkh and all are dated between 353 BC to 324 BC, mostly during the reign of Artaxerxes III. The most recent of the documents was written during the early part of Alexander the Great's reign in the region. These letters use in Aramaic the original Greek form Alexandros (spelled Lksndrs) instead of the Eastern variant Iskandar (spelled Lksndr). The collection also includes eighteen tally sticks recording transfers of goods during the reign of Darius III. The collection's letters, administrative records, and military documents are significant for the linguistic study of the Official Aramaic language and of daily life in the Achaemenid empire.

== Background ==
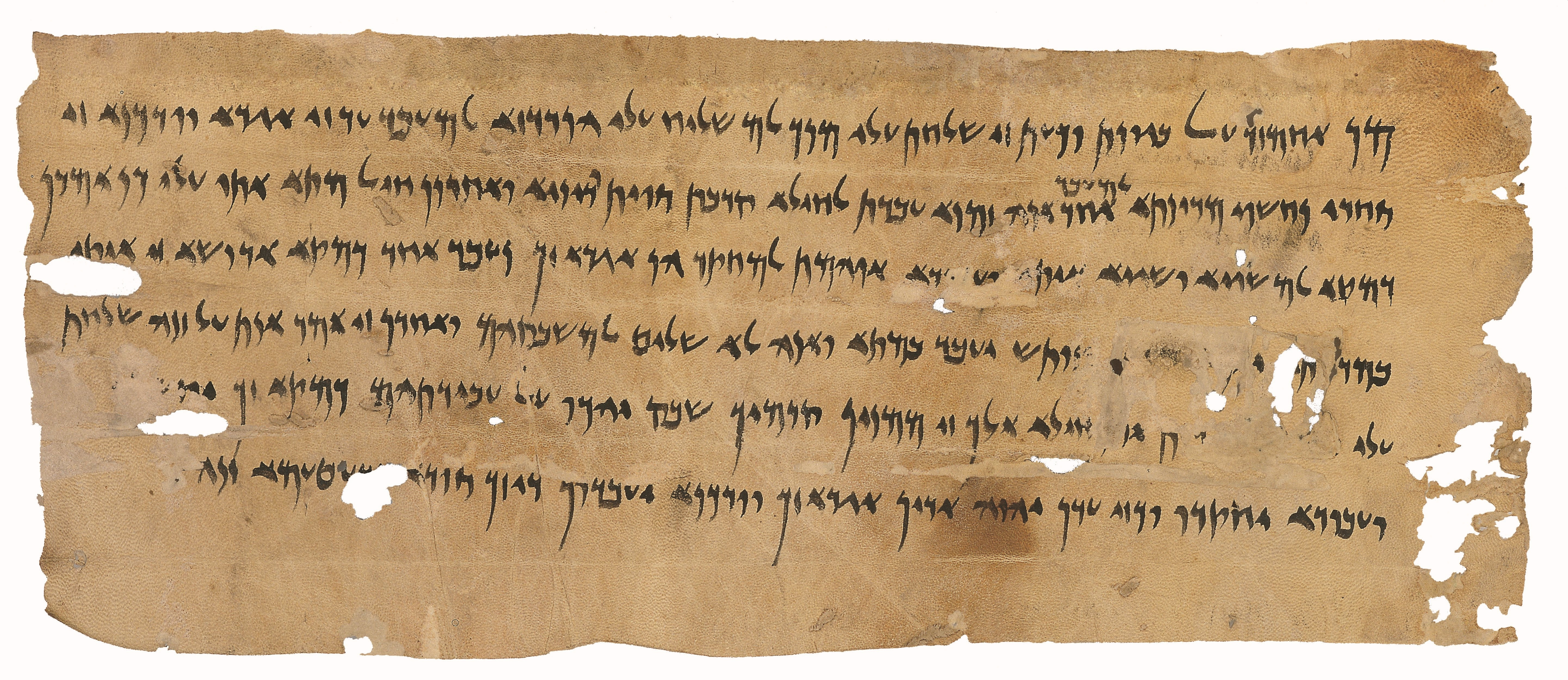
Letter from Akhvamazda to Bagavant about fortifications for Nikhshapaya, 348 or 347 BC

The Achaemenid Empire, established in 559 BC by Cyrus the Great, covered a vast part of the Middle East, stretching from India to Africa. It had an effective postal system and a book-keeping system based on a small number of languages, mainly Imperial Aramaic. Therefore, official records, such as the Khalili documents, were kept in Aramaic although that was not the spoken language of ordinary life in Bactria. Local rulers known as satraps implemented royal decrees in their provinces. The Khalili documents illuminate the administration of this empire and its eventual fall to Alexander the Great in 329 BC, dealing with topics such as city fortifications, military leave, and food delivery.

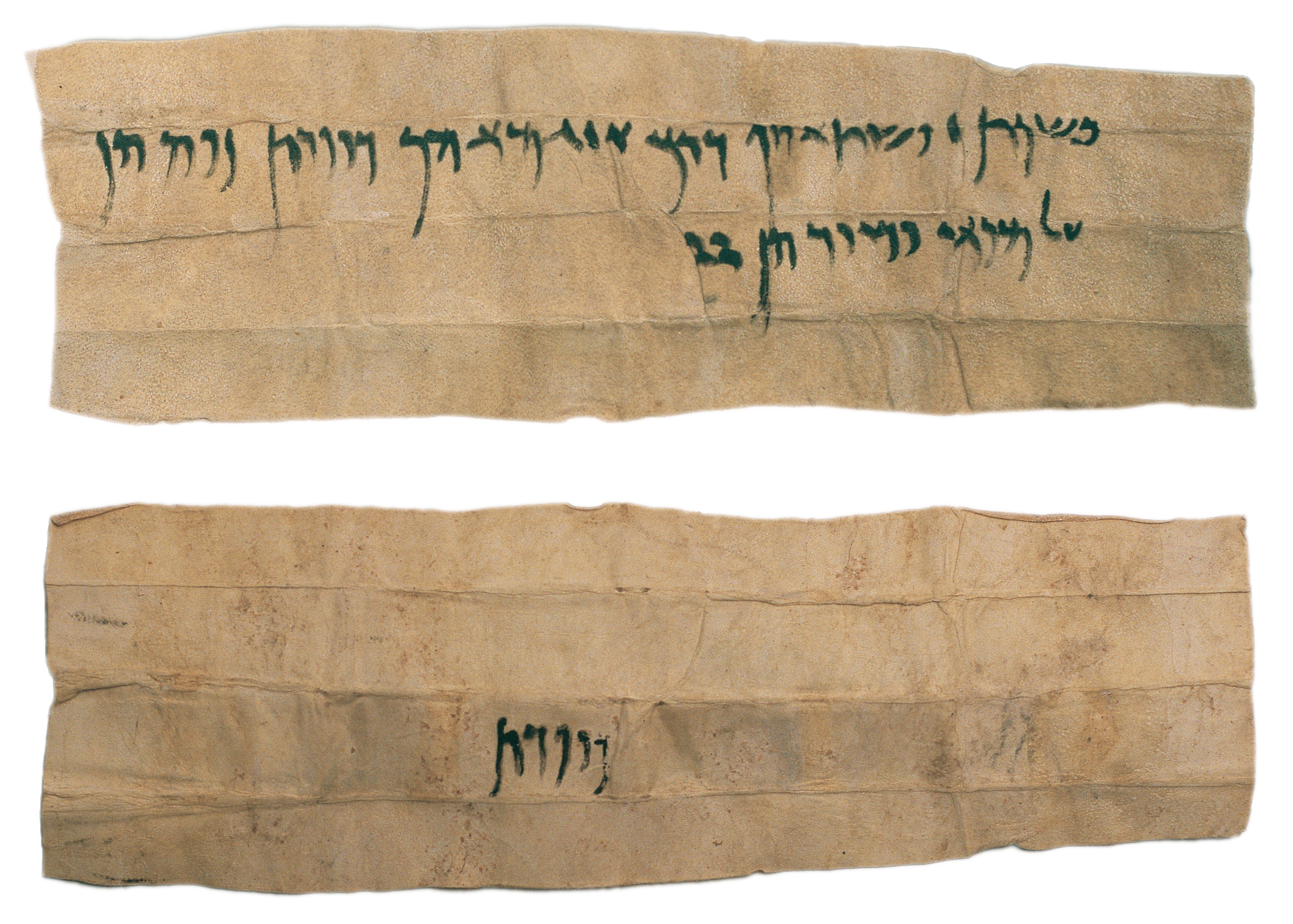
Document (recto and verso) that was found sealed, announcing the dispatch of 40 sheep, year 1 of an unspecified reign, possibly of Alexander the Great, corresponding to 330–29 BC

The collection is one of eight assembled by Nasser D. Khalili, known as the Khalili Collections, which hold a total of 35,000 artifacts. Khalili has written that he was motivated to collect Aramaic documents from the Achaemenid period because, as an Iranian Jew, he felt a personal connection to the topic. A possibly-historical queen of the Achaemenid empire, Esther, is described in the Hebrew Bible as saving the Jewish people by dissuading her husband Ahasuerus from killing them. There are references to administrative details of the Achaemenid court in the Biblical Book of Esther, which therefore must have been written by someone living close to the court. Khalili has described as unforgettable his experience, as a child in Iran, of hearing Aramaic, the language spoken by Moses and by Jesus.

== Documents in the collection ==
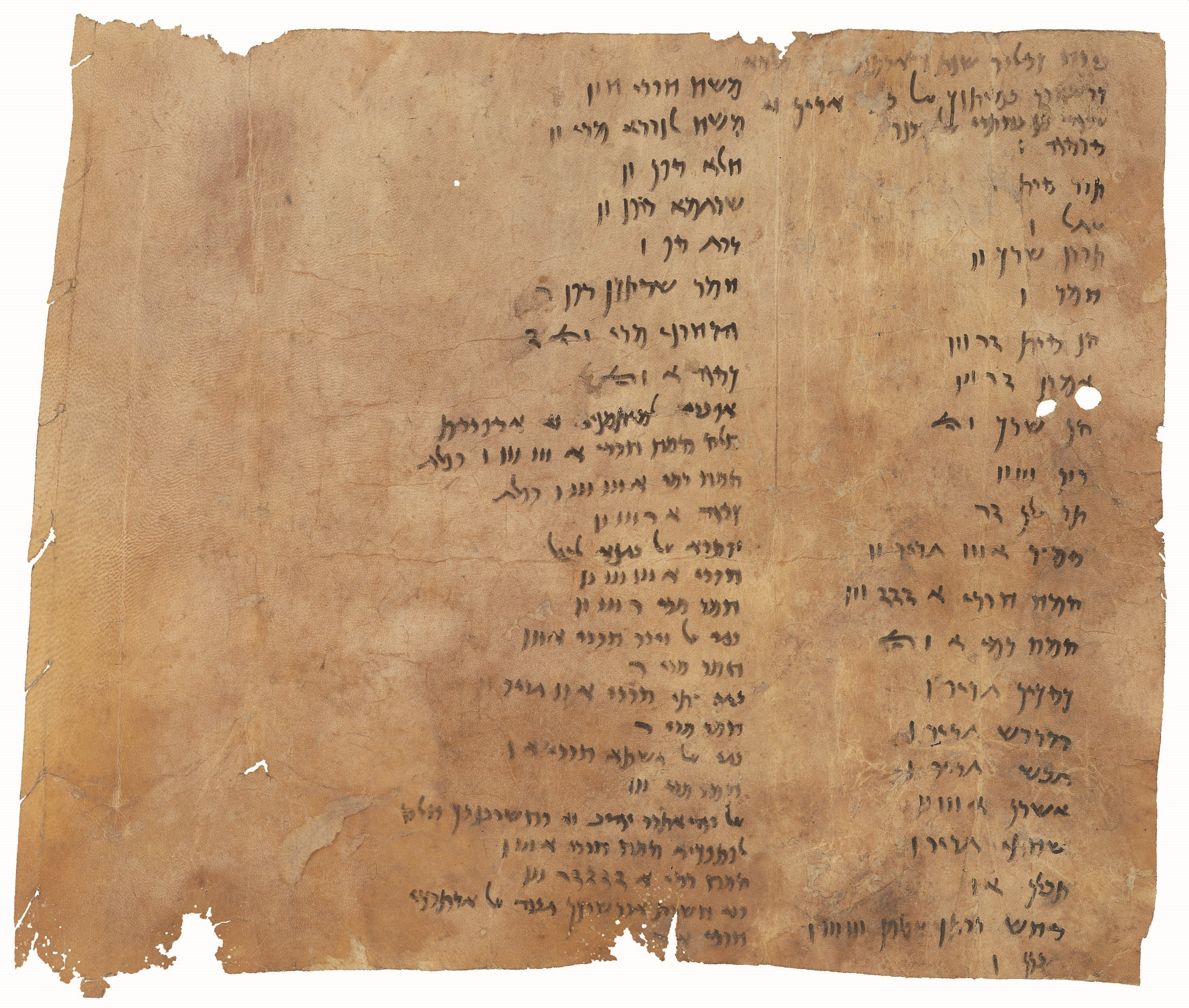
List of supplies for Bessus November–December 330 BC

From 1993 to 2002, over a hundred Bactrian documents emerged, in the bazaar of Peshawar and other sources. They included economic documents, legal documents, Buddhist texts, and letters on leather, cloth or wood. Some were found in perfect condition, still sealed. The largest collection of these was acquired by Nasser D. Khalili. Khalili's collection comprises 48 documents in Official Aramaic, consisting mainly of letters and accounts related to the court of the satrap of Bactria, whose capital city was Balkh. Similarities between these documents suggest that they are almost all from one archive in or near Balkh. Thirty of these are documents written on leather; the remaining eighteen are sticks of wood used to record debts. They are dated from 353 BC to 324 BC. Almost all the leather documents date from the reign of Artaxerxes III and the wooden sticks from the reign of Darius III.

These documents from the court archive in Bactra (modern Balkh) provide some new information on the Zoroastrian calendar. In particular, they provide the earliest datable evidence of Zoroastrian day-names in Achaemenid administration.

Together these letters and accounts make up the first discovered correspondence of the administration of Bactria and Sogdiana. They contain many grammatical errors of Aramaic, reflecting that the scribes were not everyday users of the language but would have been trained in it for its official use. The Khalili collection is one of only two sets of Achaemenid documents on leather; the other is the Arshama documents written in Babylonia and now in the collection of the Bodleian Library in Oxford, UK.

Most of the Arshama documents in the Bodleian Library were actually found in Egypt, some of them among the Elephantine papyri. They were acquired by the Bodleian Library in the 1930s, and "they concern the affairs of a figure named Arshama, who can securely be identified with the fifth-century satrap of Egypt in the days of the Persian king Darius II." The Bodleian Library documents are letters to and from Arshama.

=== Documents on leather ===
The 30 documents consist of:

- Eighteen letters, mainly from the middle of the 4th century BC but one from the early 5th century.

Eight of these letters are addressed to a local governor named Bagavant, and seem to come from a superior, thought to be the satrap Akhvamazda. These are likely to be draft copies of letters that were later copied out in a neater hand, the draft copies remaining in the sender's archive. The letters were dictated in Old Persian and written in Aramaic by professional scribes. The letters include orders, in one case to build fortifications around the frontier town of Nikhshapaya (thought to be at the location of modern Qarshi). The content of the letters illuminates the relationship between the two officials, with the satrap chiding Bagavant for disobedience and reporting complaints received. Other letters are more friendly, and seem to be addressed to officials of a similar rank to the satrap. The letters include names of deities who are not mentioned in any other known sources.

- Six lists of supplies.

Among these is the latest dated document in the collection, dated to year 7 of the reign of Alexander the Great, naming him as "Alexandros" (Lksndrs). This is the earliest surviving use in Aramaic of the original (Greek) form of Alexander's name instead of the Eastern variant "Iskandar" (Lksndr). Another list describes the provisions for troops led by Bessus, who took over as king after killing Darius III but whose reign lasted less than a year. The presence of these lists is further evidence that these documents came from the official archive of a satrap.

- A dispatch document, acquired by the collection in its original sealed form, recording a transfer of 40 sheep.
- A one-line text that may have been a label.
- Two lists of names, whose purpose is unknown.
- Two notes on a debt and acknowledging receipt of goods.

=== Tallies ===
The 18 wooden sticks are tallies, usually dated, describing quantities of goods. The types of goods are not stated, suggesting that the numbers refer to a standard traded commodity. The dates are written as years of the reign of Darius III. These tallies likely come from the practice of cutting a stick in half so that the supplier and receiver of a good each have a matching record of the transaction. The numerical quantity was not written on the stick; instead, the two halves were held together and notched with a pattern that expressed the quantity.

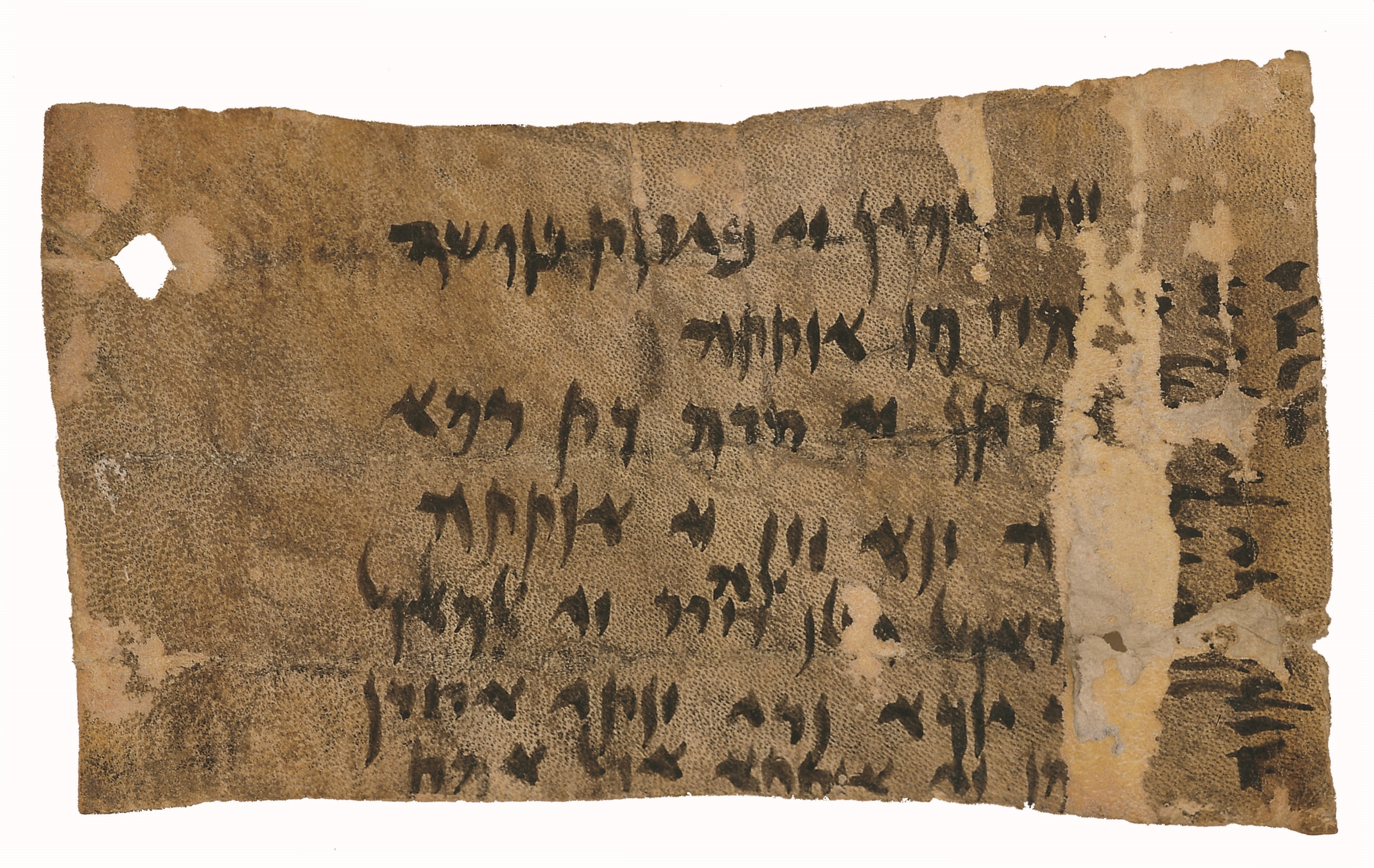
Small document, perhaps a label

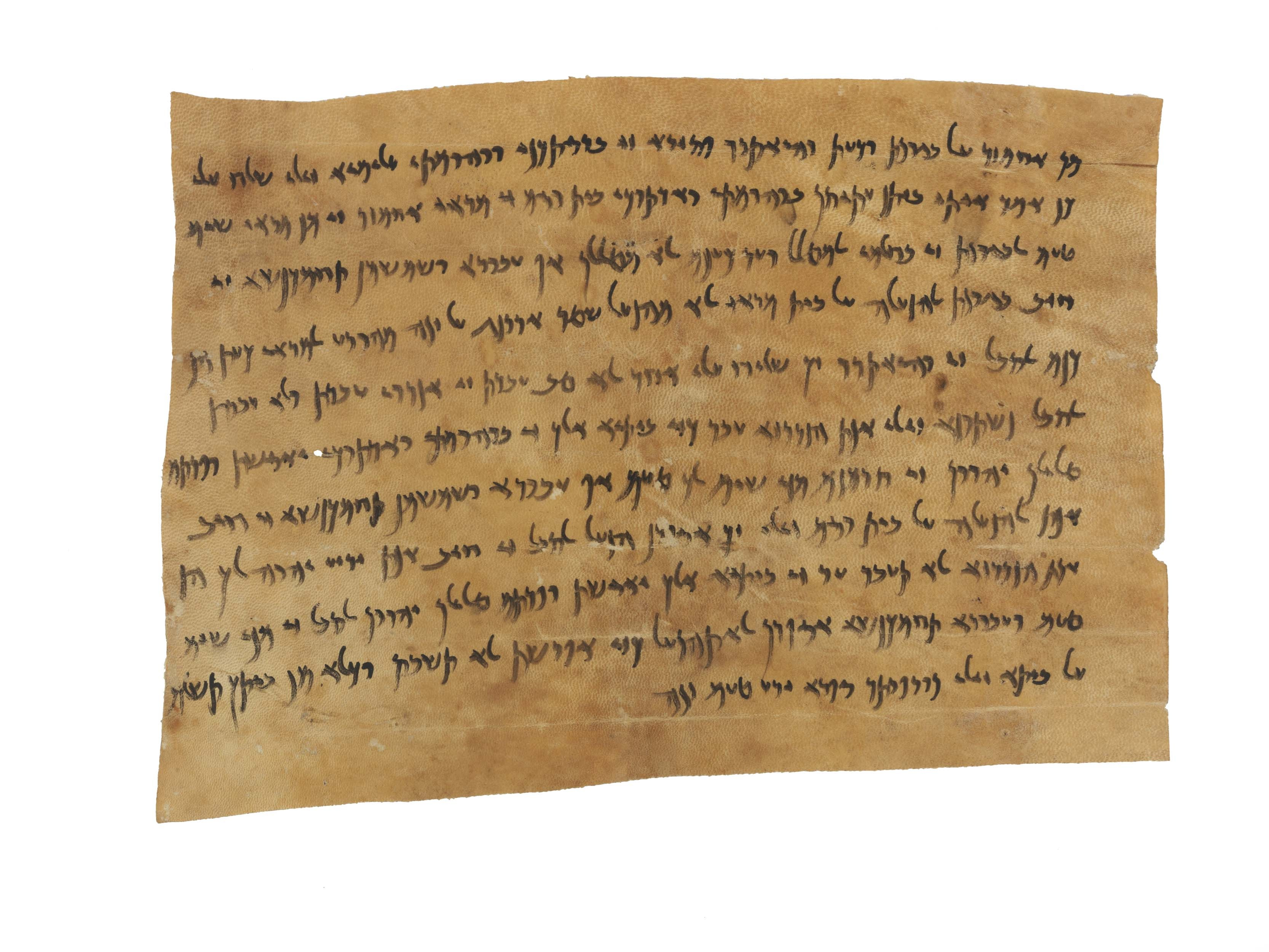
Letter from Akhvamazda to Bagavant

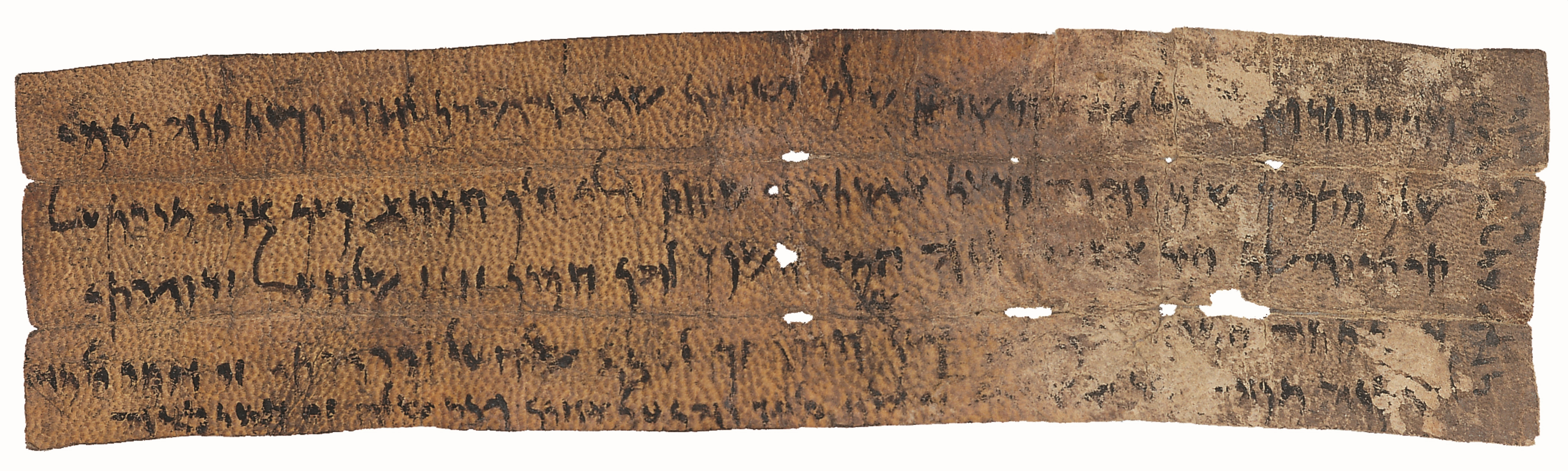
Letter from Bakhtrifarnah to Chithrachardata

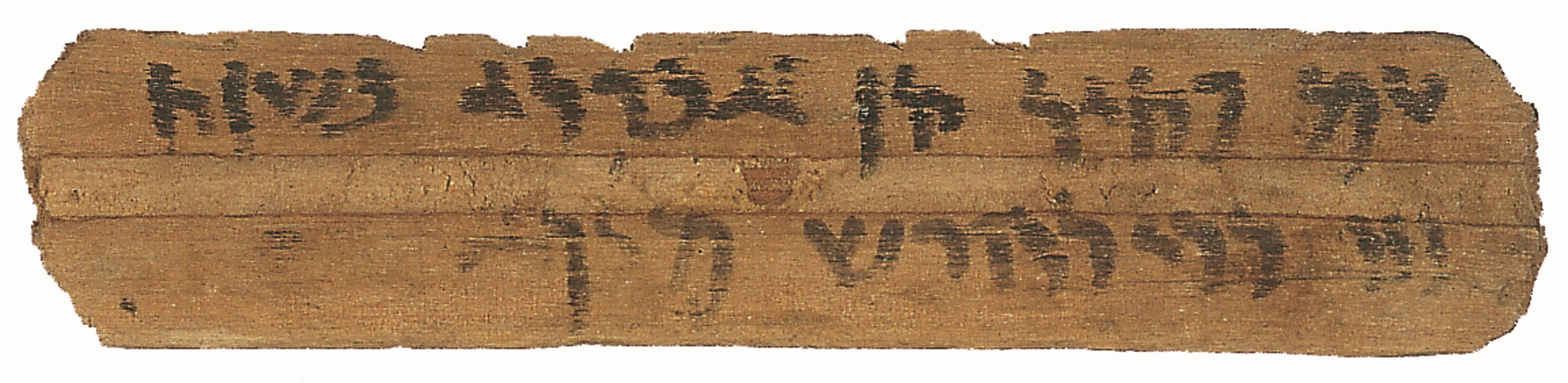
Tally stick
