= Byblos Necropolis graffito =

Phoenician funerary inscription

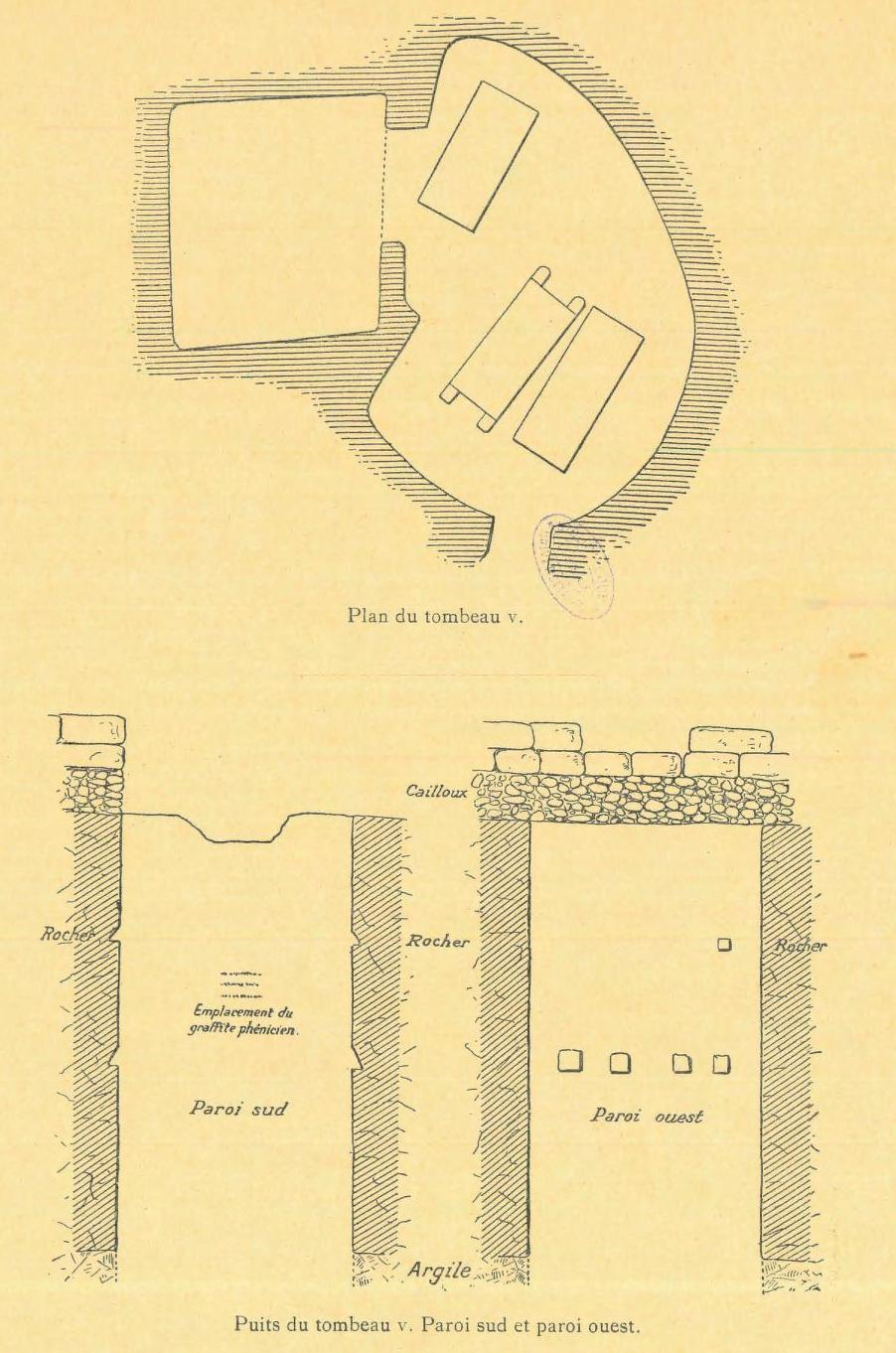
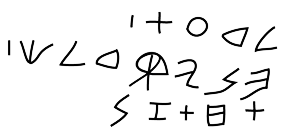
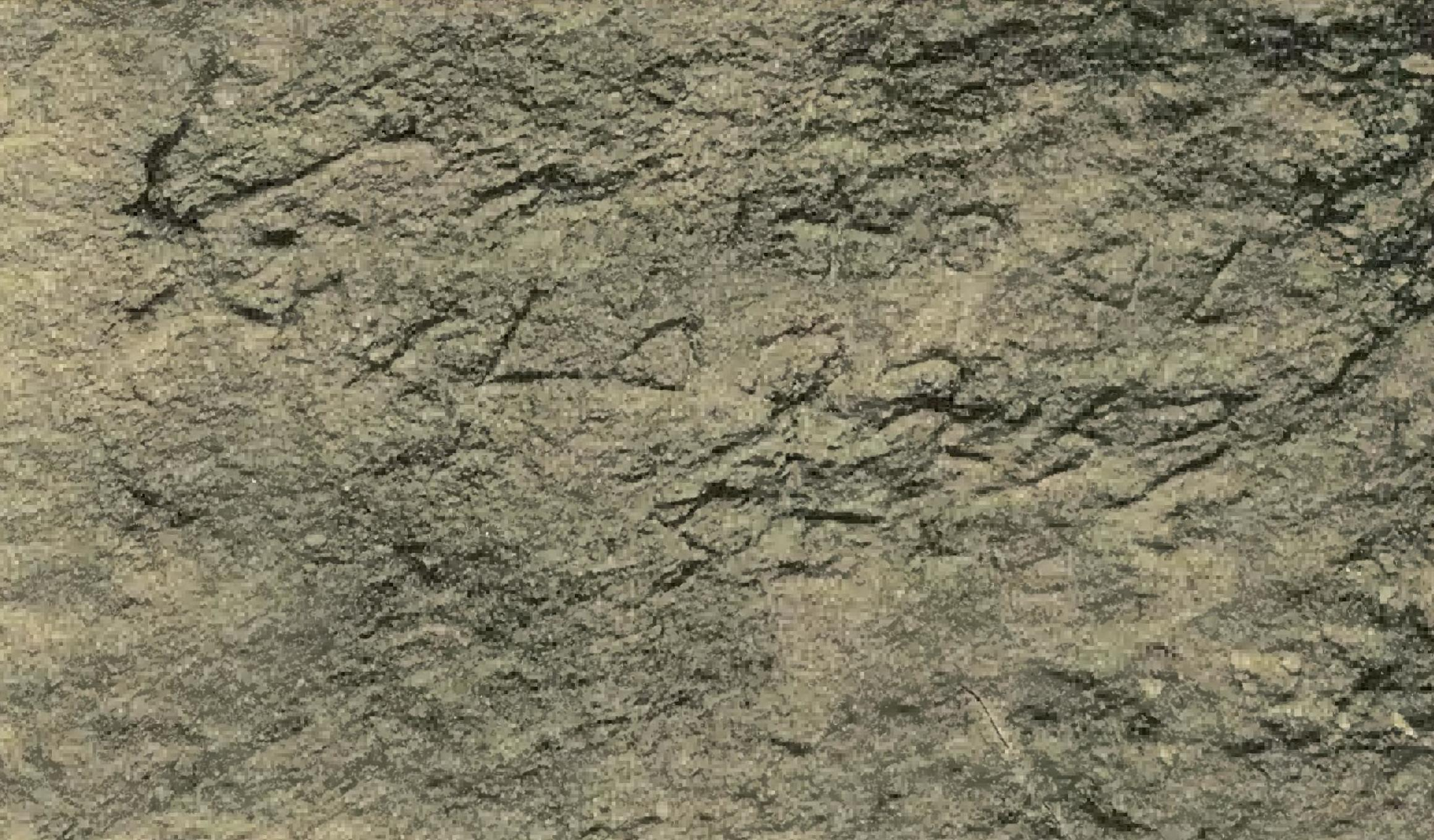
Montet's sketch of the semicircular tomb (the Ahiram sarcophagus is the middle of the three), and the location of the graffito; at the bottom is a sketch and photograph of the graffito.

The Byblos Necropolis graffito is a Phoenician inscription situated in the Royal necropolis of Byblos.

The graffito of Ahiram's tomb was found on the south wall of the shaft leading to the hypogeum, about three meters from the opening.

The three-line graffito with William F. Albright's translation:

(1)	𐤋𐤃𐤏𐤕	ld‘t	Attention!
(2)	𐤄𐤍 𐤉𐤐𐤃 𐤋𐤊	hn ypd lk	Behold, thou shalt come to grieve
(3)	𐤕𐤇𐤕 𐤆𐤍	tḥt zn	below here!

René Dussaud, who found the text, translated it as "Avis, voici ta perte (est) ci-dessous" ("Beware, here is your loss (is) below").

The fourth sign of the second line (now considered to be a pē, 𐤐), is not very clear, a bēt (𐤁) seems to have been engraved on top of a qōp (𐤒), or vice versa.

Pierre Montet, the archaeologist who excavated the royal necropolis 1922, made the following comment:

Since the graffiti is a little higher than the niches on the east and west walls, it is easy to understand why this notice was engraved here. The beams that rested in the niches supported a floor spanning the width of the shaft. The builders of the tomb did not consider that the king's corpse was sufficiently protected by the paving of the opening and by the wall built at the entrance to the chamber halfway up the well, so they laid a floor of wood which acted as a third obstacle. The looters, who would have removed the paving and started to empty the well, could not have avoided seeing the notice once they reached this floor.

== Bibliography ==
- Vincent, L. H. (1925). "Les fouilles de Byblos" [The excavations of Byblos]. Revue Biblique (1892-1940) (in French). 34 (2): 161–193. ISSN 1240-3032. JSTOR 44102762.
