= Ahiram sarcophagus =

Sarcophagus of Phoenician king

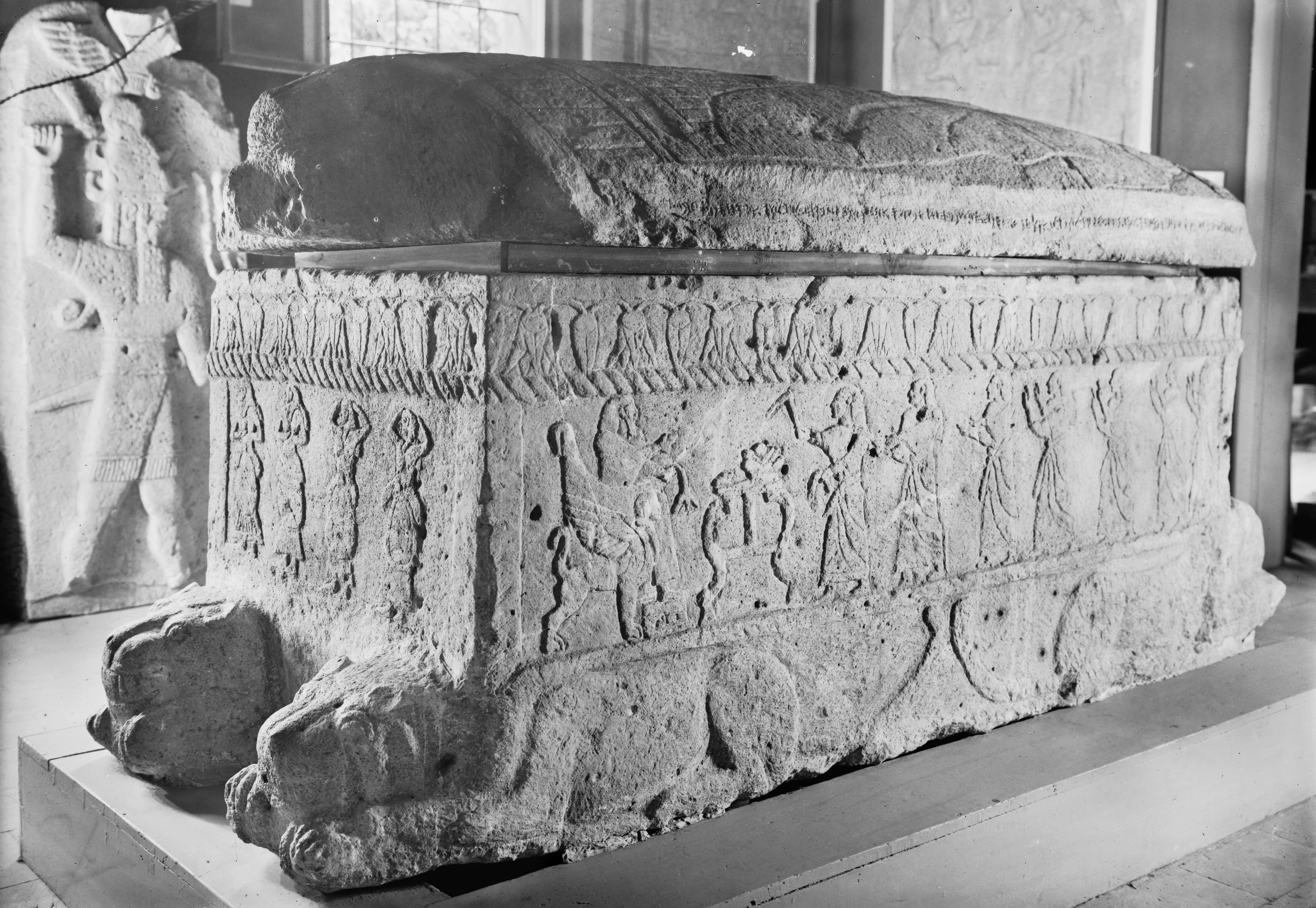
- The Sarcophagus of Ahiram in its current location (Lebanon).
- Material: Limestone
- Writing: Phoenician language
- Created: c. 1000 BC
- Discovered: 1923
- Present location: National Museum of Beirut
- Identification: KAI 1

The Ahiram sarcophagus (also spelled Ahirom; Phoenician: 𐤀𐤇𐤓𐤌) was the sarcophagus of a Phoenician King of Byblos (c. 1000 BC), discovered in 1923 by the French excavator Pierre Montet in tomb V of the royal necropolis of Byblos.

The sarcophagus is famed for its bas relief carvings, and its Phoenician inscription. One of five known Byblian royal inscriptions, the inscription is considered to be the earliest known example of the fully developed Phoenician alphabet. The Phoenician alphabet is believed to be the parent alphabet for a wide number of the world's current writing systems; including the Greek, Latin and Cyrillic Alphabets, and the Hebrew, Arabic and Urdu Abjads. For some scholars it represents the terminus post quem of the transmission of the alphabet to Europe.

Ahirom is not attested in any other Ancient Oriental source.

== Discovery ==
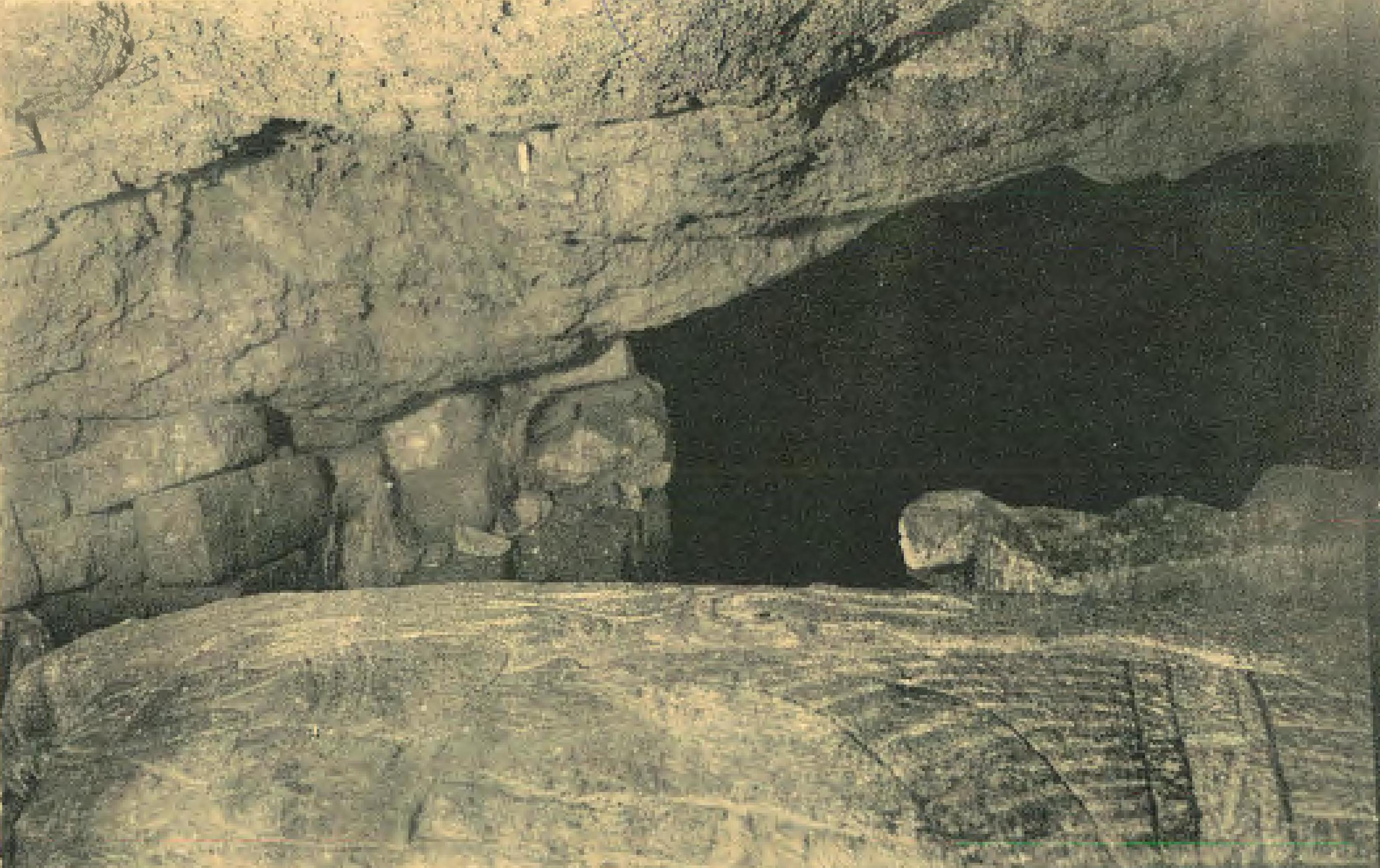
The Ahiram sarcophagus as it was found

The sarcophagus was found following a landslide in the cliffs surrounding Byblos (in now modern-day Lebanon) in late 1923, which revealed a number of Phoenician royal tombs. The tomb of Ahirom was ten metres deep.

== Sarcophagus ==
The sarcophagus of Ahiram was discovered by the French archaeologist Pierre Montet in 1923 in Byblos. Its low relief carved panels make it "the major artistic document for the Early Iron Age" in Phoenicia. Associated items dating to the Late Bronze Age either support an early dating, in the 13th century BC or attest the reuse of an early shaft tomb in the 11th century BC.

The major scene represents a king seated on a throne carved with winged sphinxes. A priestess offers him a lotus flower. On the lid two male figures face one another with seated lions between them. These figures have been interpreted by Glenn Markoe as representing the father and son of the inscription. The rendering of figures and the design of the throne and a table show strong Assyrian influences. A total absence of Egyptian objects of the 20th and 21st dynasties in Phoenicia contrasts sharply with the resumption of Phoenician-Egyptian ties in the 22nd Dynasty of Egypt.

== Dating ==
The date remains the subject of controversy, according to Glenn E. Markoe, "The Emergence of Phoenician Art". The Ahiram inscription is generally dated to ca. 1000 BCE, as Edward M. Cook notes: "Most scholars have taken the Ahiram inscription to date from around 1000 B.C.E.". Cook analyses and dismisses the date in the thirteenth century adopted by C. Garbini, which was the prime source for early dating urged in Bernal, Cadmean Letters. Also, traces of an erased early Proto-Byblian inscription are visible on the monument.

Others, on the basis of objects found near the sarcophagus, think of a later date, around 850 BCE. Arguments for a date in the mid-9th to 8th century BC for the sarcophagus reliefs themselves – and hence the inscription, too – were made on the basis of comparative art history and archaeology by Edith Porada, and on the basis of paleography among other points by Ronald Wallenfels.

== Inscriptions ==
An inscription of 38 words is found on parts of the rim and the lid of the sarcophagus. It is written in the Old Phoenician dialect of Byblos and is the oldest witness to the Phoenician alphabet of considerable length discovered to date:

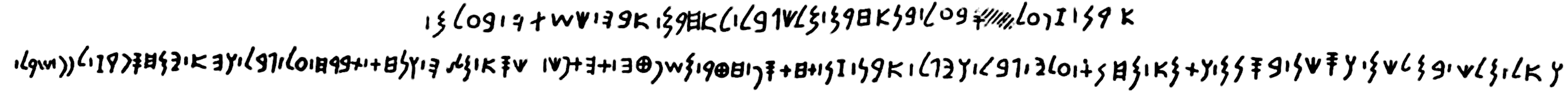

	Text	Transliteration	Translation
(text on head side:)	𐤀𐤓𐤍 𐤟 𐤆 𐤐𐤏𐤋 𐤟 [𐤐𐤋]𐤎𐤁𐤏𐤋 𐤟 𐤁𐤍 𐤀𐤇𐤓𐤌 𐤟 𐤌𐤋𐤊 𐤂𐤁𐤋 𐤟	ʾrn 𐤟 z pʿl 𐤟 [pl]s^{(?)}bʿl (or [ʾ]t^{(?)}bʿl) 𐤟 bn ʾḥrm 𐤟 mlk gbl 𐤟	This coffin [Pil]sibaʿal (or: [I]ttobaʿal) has made, the son of Aḥirom (Aḥiram), King of Byblos,
(text on head side:)	𐤋𐤀𐤇𐤓𐤌 𐤟 𐤀𐤁𐤄 𐤟 𐤊 𐤔𐤕𐤄 𐤟 𐤁𐤏𐤋𐤌 𐤟	lʾḥrm 𐤟 ʾbh 𐤟 k šth^{(?)} 𐤟 bʿlm 𐤟	for Aḥirom, his father, as he laid him down for eternity.
(text along the side of the lid:)	𐤅𐤀𐤋 𐤟 𐤌𐤋𐤊 𐤟 𐤁𐤌𐤋𐤊𐤌 𐤟	wʾl 𐤟 mlk 𐤟 bmlkm 𐤟	And when(?) a king among the kings (any king)
(text along the side of the lid:)	𐤅𐤎𐤊𐤍 𐤟 𐤁𐤎<𐤊>𐤍𐤌 𐤟	wskn 𐤟 bs<k>nm 𐤟	or a governor among the governors (any governor)
(text along the side of the lid:)	𐤅𐤕𐤌𐤀 𐤟 𐤌𐤇𐤍𐤕 𐤟 𐤏𐤋𐤉 𐤟 𐤂𐤁𐤋 𐤟	wtmʾ 𐤟 mḥnt 𐤟 ʿly 𐤟 gbl 𐤟	or a commander of the army [will rule] over Byblos (or: [marches] against Byblos),
(text along the side of the lid:)	𐤅𐤉𐤂𐤋 𐤟 𐤀𐤓𐤍 𐤟 𐤆𐤍 𐤟	wygl 𐤟 ʾrn 𐤟 zn 𐤟	and would remove (or: disclose) this coffin,
(text along the side of the lid:)	𐤕𐤇𐤕𐤎𐤐 𐤟 𐤇𐤈𐤓 𐤟 𐤌𐤔𐤐𐤈𐤄 𐤟	tḥtsp 𐤟 ḥṭr 𐤟 mšpṭh 𐤟	then his imperial scepter shall break (lit.: the staff of his legal power shall be defoliated),
(text along the side of the lid:)	𐤕𐤄𐤕𐤐𐤊 𐤟 𐤊𐤎𐤀 𐤟 𐤌𐤋𐤊𐤄 𐤟	thtpk 𐤟 ksʾ 𐤟 mlkh 𐤟	the throne of his kingship (his royal throne) shall overturn,
(text along the side of the lid:)	𐤅𐤍𐤇𐤕 𐤟 𐤕𐤁𐤓𐤇 𐤟 𐤏𐤋 𐤟 𐤂𐤁𐤋 𐤟	wnḥt 𐤟 tbrḥ 𐤟 ʿl 𐤟 gbl 𐤟	and peace shall depart from Byblos.
(text along the side of the lid:)	𐤅𐤄𐤀 𐤟 𐤉𐤌𐤇 𐤎𐤐𐤓 𐤆 𐤟	whʾ 𐤟 ymḥ spr z 𐤟	And as to him, [if] he shall erase this inscription,
(text along the side of the lid:)	𐤋𐤐𐤐 𐤟 𐤔𐤁𐤋 𐤟	lpp^{(?)} 𐤟 š^{(?)}bl 𐤟	torn(??) shall be [his] royal robe(??).

(The meaning of the last two words LPP and ŠBL is not well known and has to be guessed at; but it is clear that a curse is meant.)

The formulas of the inscription were immediately recognised as literary in nature, and the assured cutting of the archaic letters suggested to Charles Torrey a form of writing already in common use. A 10th-century BC date for the inscription has become widely accepted.

Halfway down the burial shaft another short inscription was found incised at the southern wall, the Byblos Necropolis graffito. The three-line graffito reads:

(1) ld‘t 𐤟 (2) hn yp^{?}d lk 𐤟 (3) tḥt zn

It is usually interpreted as a warning not to proceed further:

(1) Know: (2) here is disaster(?) for you (3) below this.

Recently it has been proposed that it is part of some initiation ritual which remains unknown in detail:

Concerning knowledge:
here and now be humble (you yourself!)
‹in› this basement!"

== King Ahiram ==
Ahiram himself is not titled a king, neither of Byblos nor of any other city state. It is said that he was succeeded by his son Ithobaal I who is the first to be explicitly entitled King of Byblos, which is due to an old misreading of a text lacuna. According to a new reconstruction of the lacuna the name of Ahiram's son is to be read [Pil]sibaal, and the reading Ithobaal should be disregarded. The early king list of Byblos is again subject to further study.

== Heritage designation ==
The sarcophagus is on public display in the National Museum of Beirut. The General Directorate of Antiquities of Lebanon assembled a list of inscribed objects from different time periods that together illustrate the evolution of the Phoenician alphabet; the sarcophagus is the oldest of these. This list was the basis of a nomination of the alphabet to the Memory of the World International Register maintained by UNESCO. This was accepted in 2005, recognising the objects as documentary heritage of global importance.

== Literature ==
- Pierre Montet: Byblos et l'Egypte, Quatre Campagnes des Fouilles 1921–1924, Paris 1928, pp. 228–238, tables CXXVII–CXLI ISBN 978-2913330023
- Ellen Rehm: Der Ahiram-Sarkophag, Mainz 2004 (Forschungen zur phönizisch-punischen und zyprischen Plastik II.1.1; Dynastensarkophage mit szenischen Reliefs aus Byblos und Zypern 1.1)
- Reinhard G. Lehmann: Die Inschrift(en) des Ahirom-Sarkophags und die Schachtinschrift des Grabes V in Jbeil (Byblos), Mainz 2005 (Forschungen zur phönizisch-punischen und zyprischen Plastik II.1. Dynastensarkophage mit szenischen Reliefs aus Byblos und Zypern 1.2)
- Jean-Pierre Thiollet: Je m'appelle Byblos. Paris 2005. ISBN 2914266049
- Michael Browning "Scholar updates translation of ancient inscription", in: The Palm Beach Post, Sunday, July 3, 2005, p. 17A.
- Reinhard G. Lehmann: Wer war Aḥīrōms Sohn (KAI 1:1)? Eine kalligraphisch-prosopographische Annäherung an eine epigraphisch offene Frage, in: V. Golinets, H. Jenni, H.-P. Mathys und S. Sarasin (Hg.), Neue Beiträge zur Semitistik. Fünftes Treffen der ArbeitsgemeinschaftSemitistik in der Deutschen MorgenländischenGesellschaft vom 15.–17. Februar 2012 an der Universität Basel (AOAT 425), Münster: Ugarit-Verlag 2015, pp. 163–180
