= Gières =

- Commune
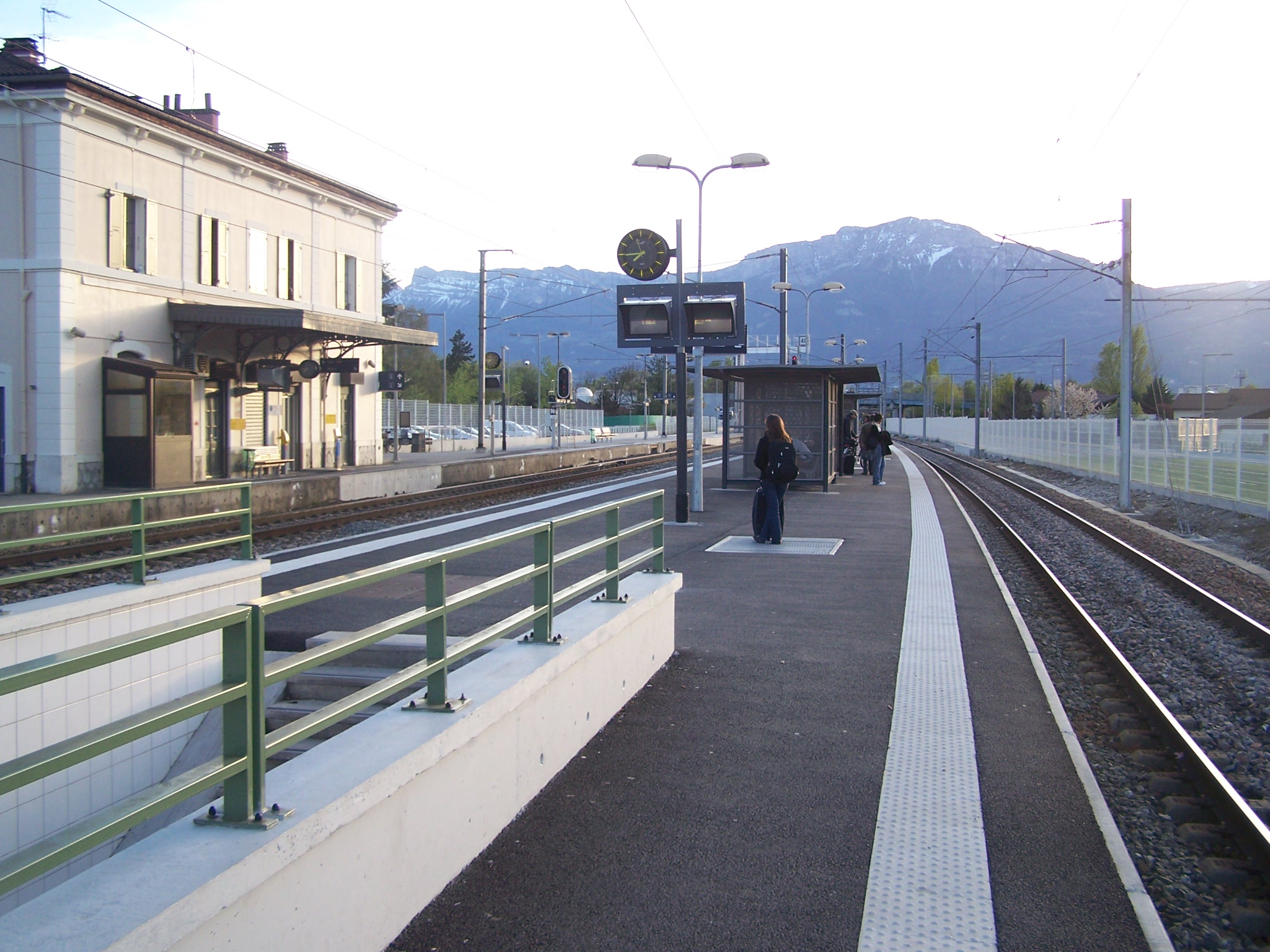
- Grenoble-Universités train station

- Coat of arms
- Location of Gières
- Location within France Location within Auvergne-Rhône-Alpes
- Coordinates: 45°10′58″N 5°47′33″E
- Country: France
- Region: Auvergne-Rhône-Alpes
- Department: Isère
- Arrondissement: Grenoble
- Canton: Saint-Martin-d'Hères
- Intercommunality: Grenoble-Alpes Métropole

Government
  - Mayor (2020–2026): Pierre Verri
- Area^{1}: 6.93 km^{2} (2.68 sq mi)
- Highest elevation: 660 m (2,170 ft)
- Lowest elevation: 205 m (673 ft)
- Population (2023): 7,376
  - Density: 1,060/km^{2} (2,760/sq mi)
- Time zone: UTC+01:00 (CET)
  - Summer (DST): UTC+02:00 (CEST)
- INSEE/Postal code: 38179 /38610
- ^{1} French Land Register data, which excludes lakes, ponds, glaciers > 1 km^{2} (0.386 sq mi or 247 acres) and river estuaries.

Gières (French pronunciation: [ʒjɛʁ]; Arpitan: Giére) is a commune in the Isère department in southeastern France. It is part of the Grenoble urban unit (agglomeration). The archaeologist Joseph Chamonard (1866–1936) died in Gières. Grenoble-Universités-Gières station has rail connections to Grenoble, Chambéry and Valence.

== Population ==
Historical population

Year	Pop.	±% p.a.
1793	910	—
1800	1,001	+1.37%
1806	1,039	+0.62%
1821	1,098	+0.37%
1831	1,153	+0.49%
1836	1,146	−0.12%
1841	1,162	+0.28%
1846	1,208	+0.78%
1851	1,185	−0.38%
1856	1,164	−0.36%
1861	1,111	−0.93%
1866	1,202	+1.59%
1872	1,163	−0.55%
1876	1,143	−0.43%
1881	1,112	−0.55%
1886	1,142	+0.53%
1891	1,133	−0.16%
1896	1,134	+0.02%
1901	1,031	−1.89%

Year	Pop.	±% p.a.
1906	1,063	+0.61%
1911	1,078	+0.28%
1921	1,041	−0.35%
1926	1,166	+2.29%
1931	1,287	+1.99%
1936	1,308	+0.32%
1946	1,320	+0.09%
1954	1,624	+2.62%
1962	1,846	+1.61%
1968	2,801	+7.20%
1975	3,346	+2.57%
1982	4,005	+2.60%
1990	4,373	+1.10%
1999	6,127	+3.82%
2007	6,161	+0.07%
2012	6,200	+0.13%
2017	6,779	+1.80%
2023	7,376	+1.42%

Source: EHESS and INSEE (1968-2023)

== Twin towns ==
Gières is twinned with:

- Vignate, Italy, since 1980
- Independencia, Peru, since 1989
- Certeze, Romania, since 1990
- Bethlehem, Palestine, since 1996

== See also ==
- Communes of the Isère department
