= Joseph Chamonard =

French archaeologist (1866–1936)

Joseph Chamonard (11 November 1866 in Lyon – 29 November 1936 in Gières) was a French archaeologist.

== Biography ==
A student of the École normale supérieure (1887), he became a member of the French School at Athens in 1890. In 1892 and 1893, he worked at the excavations of Lagina (Caria) with Osman Hamdi Bey and participated in the clearing of the Delos theatre.

From 1904 to 1906, he searched again at Delos then became secretary of the French School of Athens (1908–1912). Secretary and interpreter of the expedition of Dardanelles (1914), he participated to the excavations of Elaeus.

In 1920, he founded the Department of Antiquities in Syria and became its director. He still searched in Delos (1924 and 1930) and negotiated the sending to France of Lebanese and Syrian students to train under the direction of the museum he founded.

== Works (selection) ==
- Le quartier du théâtre, étude sur l'habitation délienne à l'époque hellénistique, École française d'Athènes, IX, 1922-1924, p. 234-463
- Les mosaïques de la Maison des Masques, in Exploration archéologique de Délos N° 14, 1933
- Kérylos, with Emmanuel Pontremoli, 1934

== Bibliography ==
- H. Seyrig, Syria, 1937, p. 411-412
- Revue des études anciennes, vol.39, 1967, p. 54
- Eve Gran-Aymerich, Les chercheurs de passé, Éditions du CNRS, 2007, p. 687-688
