= Terminus post quem =

Earliest date possible for something

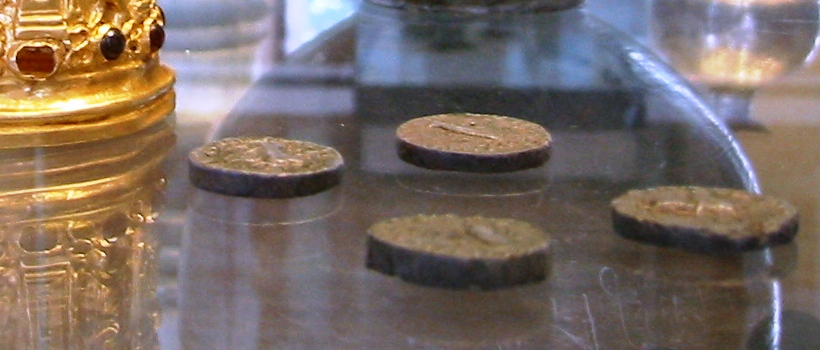
The coins of Azes II found inside the Bimaran casket provide a terminus post quem: for the coins to have been placed inside, the casket was necessarily consecrated after the beginning of the reign of Azes II.

A terminus post quem ('limit after which', sometimes abbreviated TPQ) and terminus ante quem ('limit before which', abbreviated TAQ) specify the known limits of dating for events or items.

A terminus post quem is the earliest date the event may have happened or the item was in existence, and a terminus ante quem is the latest. An event may well have both a terminus post quem and a terminus ante quem, in which case the limits of the possible range of dates are known at both ends, but many events have just one or the other. Similarly, a terminus ad quem 'limit to which' is the latest possible date of a non-punctual event (period, era, etc.), whereas a terminus a quo 'limit from which' is the earliest. The concepts are similar to those of upper and lower bounds in mathematics.

These terms are often used in archaeological and historical studies, such as dating layers in excavated sites, coins, historical events, authors, inscriptions or texts where the exact dates may not be known or may be in dispute.

== Example ==
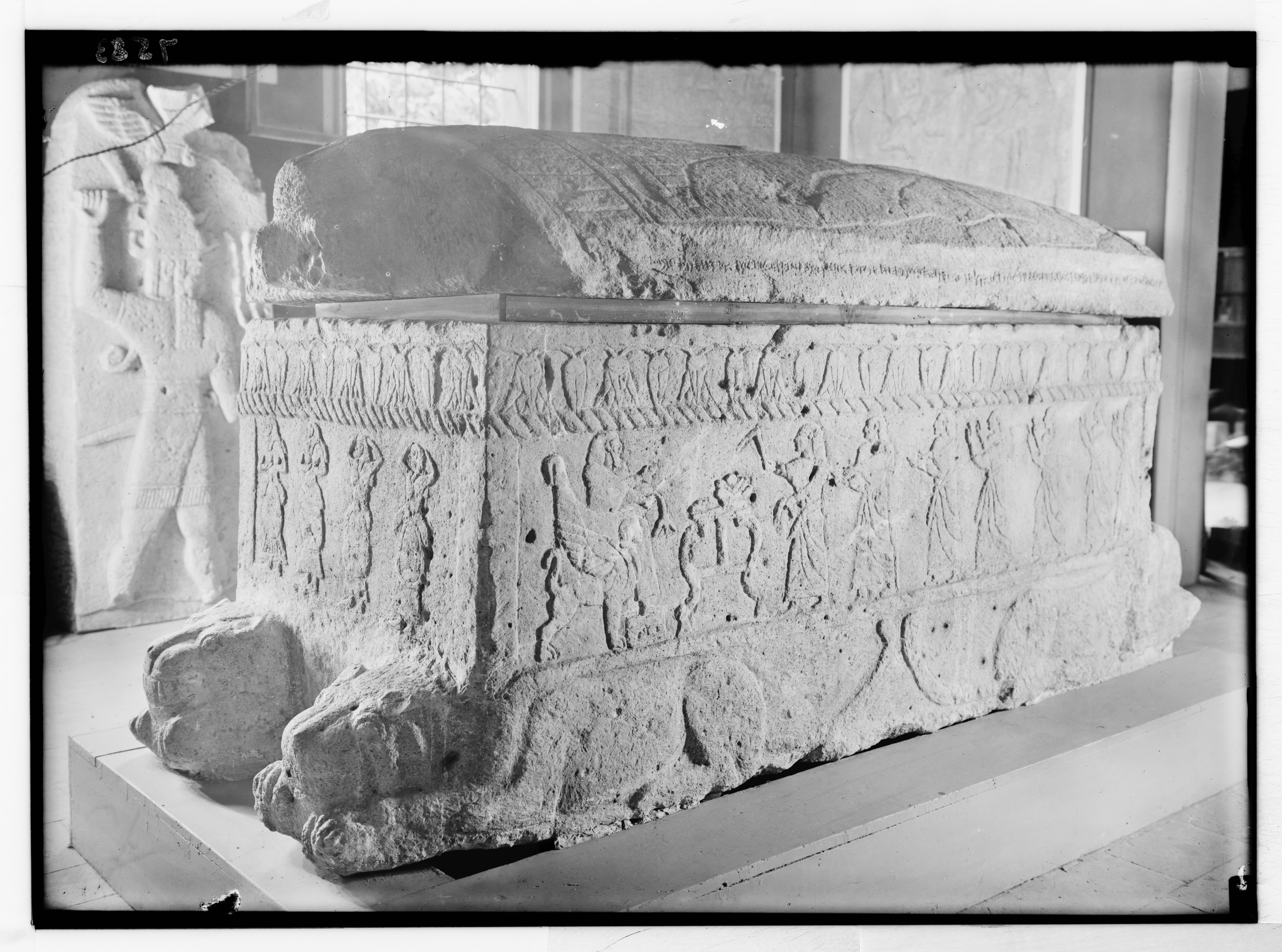
The Phoenician inscription on the sarcophagus of Ahiram is the earliest known example of the fully developed Phoenician alphabet. For some scholars, it represents the terminus post quem of the transmission of the alphabet to Europe.

For example, consider an archaeological find of a burial that contains coins dating to 1588, 1595, and others less securely dated to 1590–1625. The terminus post quem for the burial would be the latest date established with certainty: in this case, 1595. A secure dating of an older coin to an earlier date would not shift the terminus post quem, while securing the later date of 1625 would make that date the terminus post quem.

An archaeological example of a terminus ante quem would be deposits formed before a historically dateable event, such as building foundations that were partly demolished to make way for the construction of a city wall. If it is known that the wall was finished in 650, then the foundations must have been demolished in 650 or earlier; all that can be said from the evidence is that it happened before the known event.

Other examples of things that may establish a terminus are known dates of death or travel by persons involved, a particular form of heraldry that can be dated (see pastiglia for example), references to reigning monarchs or office-holders, or a placing relative to any other events whose date is securely known. In a modern context, dated images, such as those available in Google Earth, may establish termini.

== Related terms ==
A terminus ante quem non differs from a terminus post quem by not implying the event necessarily took place. 'Event E happened after time T' implies E occurred, whereas 'event E did not happen before time T' leaves open the possibility that E never occurred at all.

In project planning, sometimes the phrases "no earlier than" / "no later than" (NET/NLT) are used.

== See also ==
- Interval (time)
- List of Latin phrases
- Relative dating
