= Charles Virolleaud =

French archaeologist

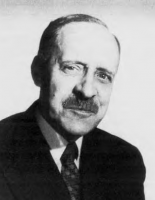
Virolleaud, c. 1919

Jean Charles Gabriel Virolleaud (2 July 1879 – 17 December 1968) was a French archaeologist, one of the excavators of Ugarit.

Virolleaud was the author of La légende du Christ (1908) and was an advocate of the Christ myth theory. He also wrote the books La Civilisation phénicienne (1933) and La Mythologie phénicienne (1938).

== Publications ==
- Premier supplément à la liste des signes cunéiformes de Brünnow (1903)
- Études sur la divination chaldéenne (1904)
- La légende du Christ (1908)
- L'Astrologie chaldéenne: le livre intitulé "Enuma (Anu ilu) Bel" (1908)
- L'Astrologie chaldéenne: Supplement (1909)
- La Civilisation phénicienne (1933)
- La Mythologie phénicienne (1938)
