= Osorkon Bust =

Bust of Egyptian pharaoh Osorkon I

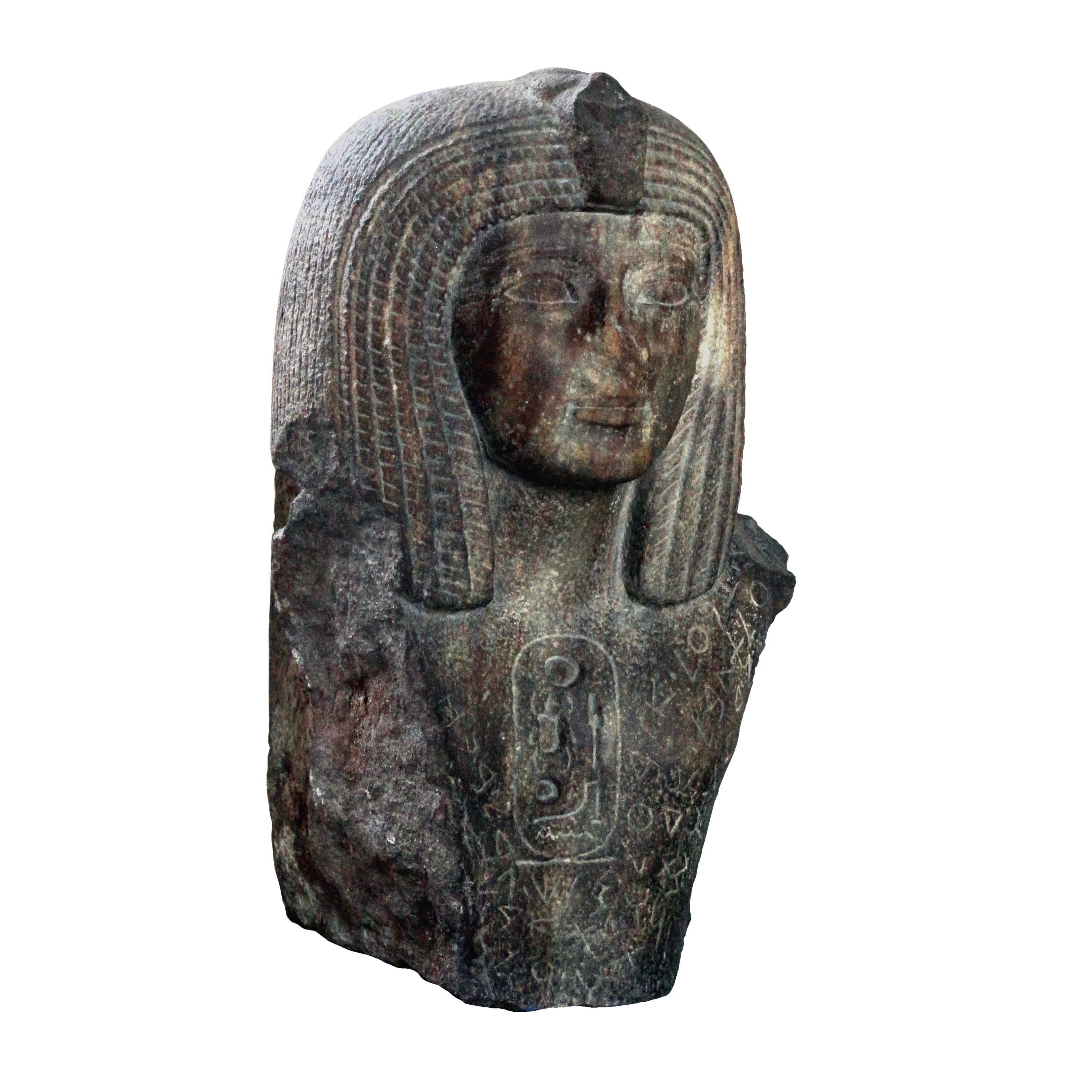
- The Osorkon Bust, showing the Phoenician inscription on either side of the Egyptian cartouche
- Material: Quartzite
- Height: 60 cm
- Writing: Phoenician
- Created: c. 900 BC
- Discovered: c. 1881; Byblos, Keserwan-Jbeil, Lebanon
- Present location: Louvre
- Identification: AO 9502

The Osorkon Bust, also known as the Eliba'l Inscription, is a bust of Egyptian pharaoh Osorkon I, discovered in Byblos (in today's Lebanon) in the 19th century. Like the Tabnit sarcophagus from Sidon, it is decorated with two separate and unrelated inscriptions – one in Egyptian hieroglyphics and one in Phoenician script. It was created in the early 10th century BC, and was unearthed c. 1881, very likely in the Temple of Baalat Gebal.

The Egyptian writing is the prenomen of Osorkon, and the Phoenician is a dedication to Elibaal, the king of Byblos.

The details of the find were published in by French archaeologist René Dussaud in 1925.

The bust is made of quartzite, and is 60 cm × 36 cm × 37.5 cm.

== Discovery ==
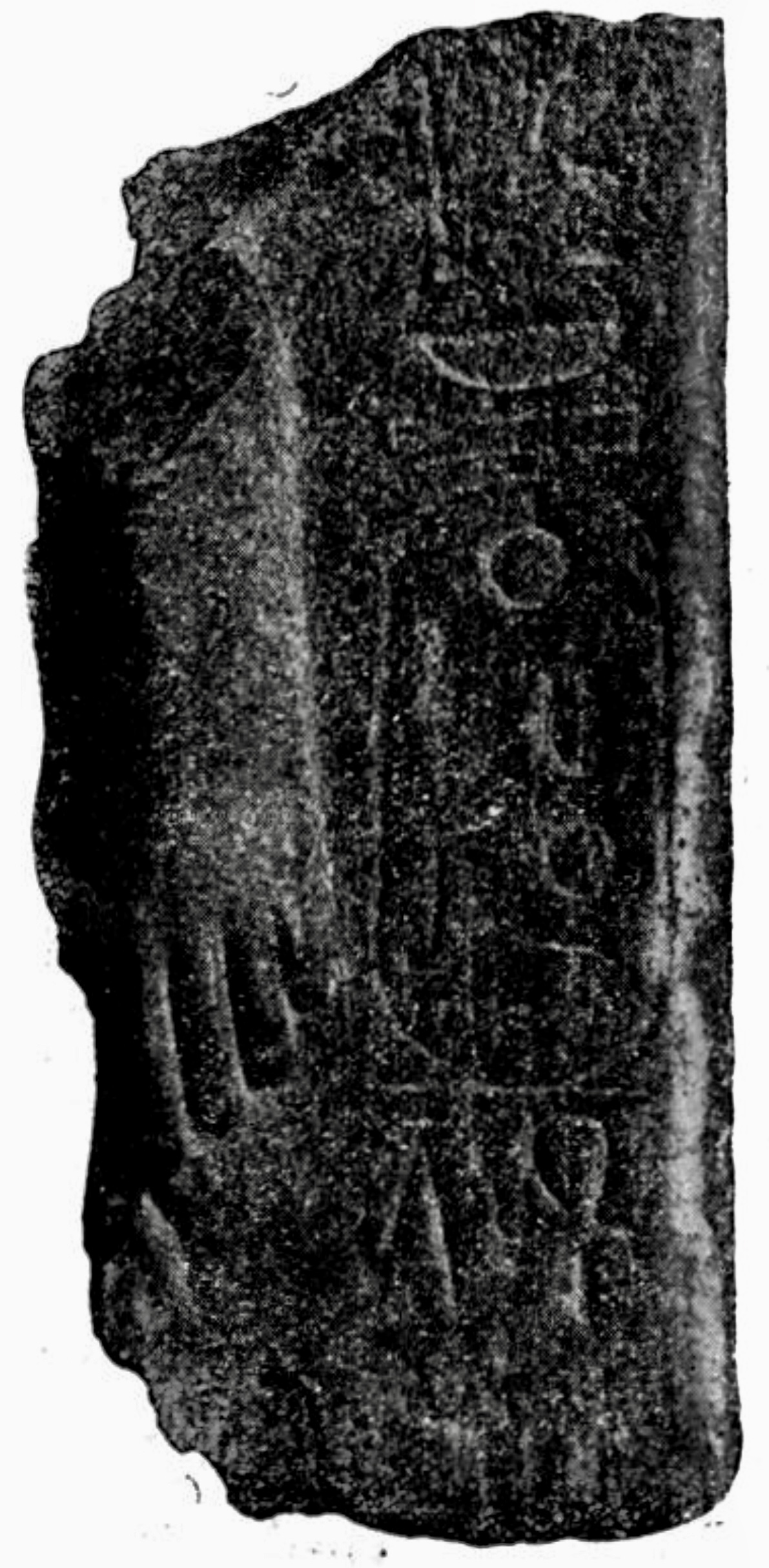
The arm of the statue

The first mention of the statue was by German archaeologist Alfred Wiedemann in 1884 in his Ägyptische Geschichte: German: zwei Fragmente einer grossen Steinstatue sind gleichfalls erhalten geblieben [Im Besitz des Herrn Meuricoffre zu Neapel.] In English: "two fragments of a large stone statue have also been preserved [owned by Mr. Meuricoffre at Naples.]"

In 1895, Weidemann published the Egyptian hieroglyphs: German: Vor nahezu 15 Jahren hatte ich Gelegenheit im Landhause des H. Bankier Meuricoffre zu Neapel eine grosse Statue aus hartem Sandstein des Koenigs Osorkon I kennen zu lernen. Von ihr waren zwei Fragmente erhalten. Zunaechst die Buste, an deren Brust vorn stand, am Guertel befand sich der Cartouchenrest, am Ruekenpfeiler. Dann ein Theil der Basis mit darauf stehenden Fuss. In English: "Almost 15 years ago I had the opportunity to visit the country house of the banker Meuricoffre of Naples to get to know a large statue made of hard sandstone of King Osorkon I. Two fragments were preserved from it. First the bust, on the chest of which stood at the front, on the belt there was the rest of the cartouches, and on the rock pillar. Then a part of the base with the foot."

== Phoenician inscription ==
mš. z p‘l. ’lb‘l. mlk. gbl. byḥ [mlk. mlk gbl]
Statue which Eliba‘al, king of Byblos, son of Yeḥi[milk, king of Byblos] made

[lb]‘lt. gbl. ’dtw. t’rk. b‘lt [.gbl]
[for the Ba]‘alat of Byblos, his Lady. May the Ba‘alat [of Byblos] prolong

[ymt. ’]lb‘l. wšntw. ‘l[. gbl]
[the days of E]liba‘al and his years over [Byblos]

== Exhibition history ==
The bust was part of the 2026 exhibition Byblos, cité millénaire at the Institut du monde arabe.
