= Baalat Gebal =

Tutelary goddess of Byblos

- Tutelary goddess of Byblos
- Phoenician: 𐤁𐤏𐤋𐤕 𐤂𐤁𐤋
- Temple: Temple of Baalat Gebal

Equivalents
- Egyptian: Hathor, Isis
- Greek: Aphrodite, Dione

Baalat Gebal (Phoenician: 𐤁𐤏𐤋𐤕 𐤂𐤁𐤋, BʿLT GBL; also romanized as Ba’alat Gebal or Baalat Gubal; literally "Lady of Byblos"), also known as Bēltu ša Gubla (Akkadian: ^{d}NIN ša ^{uru}Gub-la) and Baaltis, was the tutelary goddess of the city of Byblos. While in the past it was often assumed her name is only an epithet, presently researchers assume that it is a proper name, meant to highlight her close connection to the corresponding city. She was identified with Hathor and later possibly with Isis by ancient Egyptians, and with Aphrodite by ancient Greeks. Philo of Byblos instead refers to her as "Dione", though the reasons behind this choice remain unknown. She was the main goddess in the local pantheon of Byblos, and a temple dedicated to her, which remained in use from the third millennium BCE to the Roman period, was located in the center of this city. She was venerated by the kings of Byblos, with a large number of references to her found in letters sent by Rib-Addi as a part of the Amarna correspondence. There is also evidence that she was worshiped by Egyptians, both in Byblos and in Egypt. She is mentioned in a number of literary texts, including the so-called Letter of Hori, the writings of Philo of Byblos, and Lucian's De Dea Syria.

== Name and identity ==
The Phoenician theonym Baalat Gebal (b’lt gbl) can be translated as “Lady of Byblos”. A direct Akkadian translation, ^{d}NIN ša ^{uru}Gub-la, read as Bēltu ša Gubla, occurs in the Amarna letters. Shortened variants ^{d}NIN-nu (bēletnu, “our lady”) and ^{d}NIN are also attested. The name was meant to highlight her connection to the city. It has been proposed that a male deity with a similar name, the “Lord of Byblos”, also existed, and can be identified with the figure of AN.DA.MU from the Amarna letters, but this proposal is not universally accepted. Nadav Na'aman instead suggests interpreting AN.DA.MU as a “honorific title” of Baalat Gebal herself, “the living goddess”.

In the past researchers have often attempted to prove that “Baalat Gebal” should be understood as an epithet rather than a proper name. She has been variously identified as a local form of Asherah, argued to be an appropriate tutelary goddess for a port city due to being addressed as “lady of the sea” in Ugarit, Anat (as suggested by Edward Lipiński) and especially commonly Astarte. Frank Moore Cross argued that Baalat Gebal might have been identical with Qudshu, who he identifies as an alternate name of Asherah (Elat) according to him used in Ugarit and Egypt. However, Christiane Zivie-Coche describes Qudshu as an Egyptian invention, with no forerunners in the Ancient Near East. Izak Cornelius also considers her to be a separate deity, and rejects an association between Baalat Gebal and Asherah, noting that a link to Astarte is more plausible. Evidence for the presumed identification of Baalat Gebal with Astarte is limited to three late, unprovenanced inscriptions; in one, which is bilingual, Astarte occurs in Greek and Baalat Gebal in Phoenician, which appears to indicate the former served as interpretatio graeca of the latter, while in the other two Astarte is addressed as the goddess of Byblos, though with the title rbt gbl rather than b’lt gbl. Direct evidence on the contrary comes from Philo of Byblos’ Phoenician History, where Astarte and Baaltis (Baalat Gebal) are two separate goddesses, portrayed as sisters, and only the latter is linked to Byblos.

As argued recently by Anna Elise Zernecke (2013), it is not impossible that inhabitants of Byblos saw “Baalat Gebal” as a proper name, with no other “true name” designating the local goddess. She points out that in Phoenician inscriptions her name is left undivided, while a divider occurs between the two elements of the title mlk.gbl (“king of Byblos”), which she assumes indicates the former was understood as a proper name rather than a title like the latter. Zernecke’s approach has also been adopted by Michael J. Stahl in his study of the goddess (2021). It has been pointed out that most of the explicit evidence for the identification of Baalat Gebal and other deities is limited to Egyptian and Greek sources, which makes it possible that such texts constitute an example of interpretatio graeca and analogous phenomena. Frances Pinnock has suggested that the vagueness of her name might have resulted in foreign rulers from Egypt, and possibly also Ebla and elsewhere, being able to identify her as an aspect of their own deities.

Due to contacts between Byblos and Egypt, Baalat Gebal came to be identified with Hathor. Egyptians referred to the latter goddess as the “Lady of Byblos” (nbt kpn), a reflection of Baalat Gebal’s name. She could also be referred to as “Lady of Dendera who dwells in Byblos”. The oldest attestation of the connection between the two goddesses occurs in the Coffin Texts. In the relevant passage, Hathor is addressed as the “Lady of Byblos” while she is invoked as a protector of the passengers of the solar barque. This association finds parallels in instances of linking the same Egyptian goddess to various other distant areas, including Sinai, Punt, Wadi el-Hudi and Gebel el-Asr. It is possible that this phenomenon had an ideological dimension, as interpreting foreign goddess as Hathor made it possible to present payments made to local temples in areas such as Byblos and Punt, possibly made to acquire local goods, as a display of piety towards an Egyptian deity. In a text from the reign of Thutmose III, the official Minmose lists the temple of “Hathor, Lady of Byblos” among these belonging to Egyptian deities, and it is possible that the connection was reinforced by Egyptian involvement in local construction projects. No references to the connection between Baalat Gebal and Hathor postdate the New Kingdom, both due to less frequent contact with Byblos and due to the latter being partially replaced by Isis in Egyptian religion. These two Egyptian goddesses were also partially identified with each other, and there is evidence that Baalat Gebal might have been identified with Isis as well, including an inscription on a statue of Osorkon II found in Byblos, which mentions Isis, and to a reference to a connection between Isis and the city of Byblos in Plutarch's De Iside et Osiride. Marwan Kilani notes that the inhabitants of Byblos might have attempted to accommodate the changes occurring in the religion of Egypt by identifying their goddess with Isis. Depictions of Baalat Gebal from the Achaemenid period show similarity to images of “Hathor-Isis” from Egypt, which might indicate she was specifically identified with the syncretic form of these two goddesses. She was portrayed holding an Egyptian scepter and wearing a horned crown decorated with the sun disk.

Greek authors seemingly regarded Baalat Gebal as analogous to Aphrodite. Philo of Byblos instead equates her with Dione. According to Alan I. Baumgarten, due to lack of evidence it is impossible to determine what factors guided this choice. Frank Moore Cross suggested that the identification of Baalat Gebal as Dione reflected the parallel between the names Zeus and Dione and El and Elat. This has been criticized by Baumgarten, who points out the name Elat was never used to refer to Baalat Gebal, and that even if Cross’ theory was adjusted to apply to names Baalat and Baal, it would remain impossible to prove.

== Worship ==
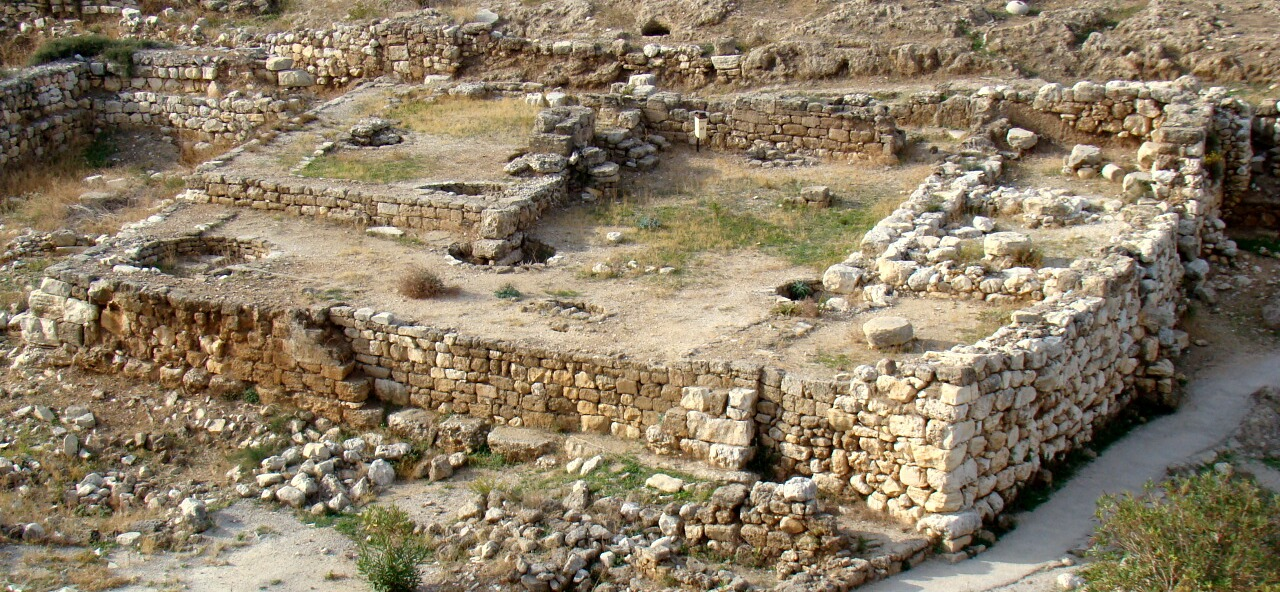
Foundation of the inner rooms of the temple of Baalat Gebal in Byblos.

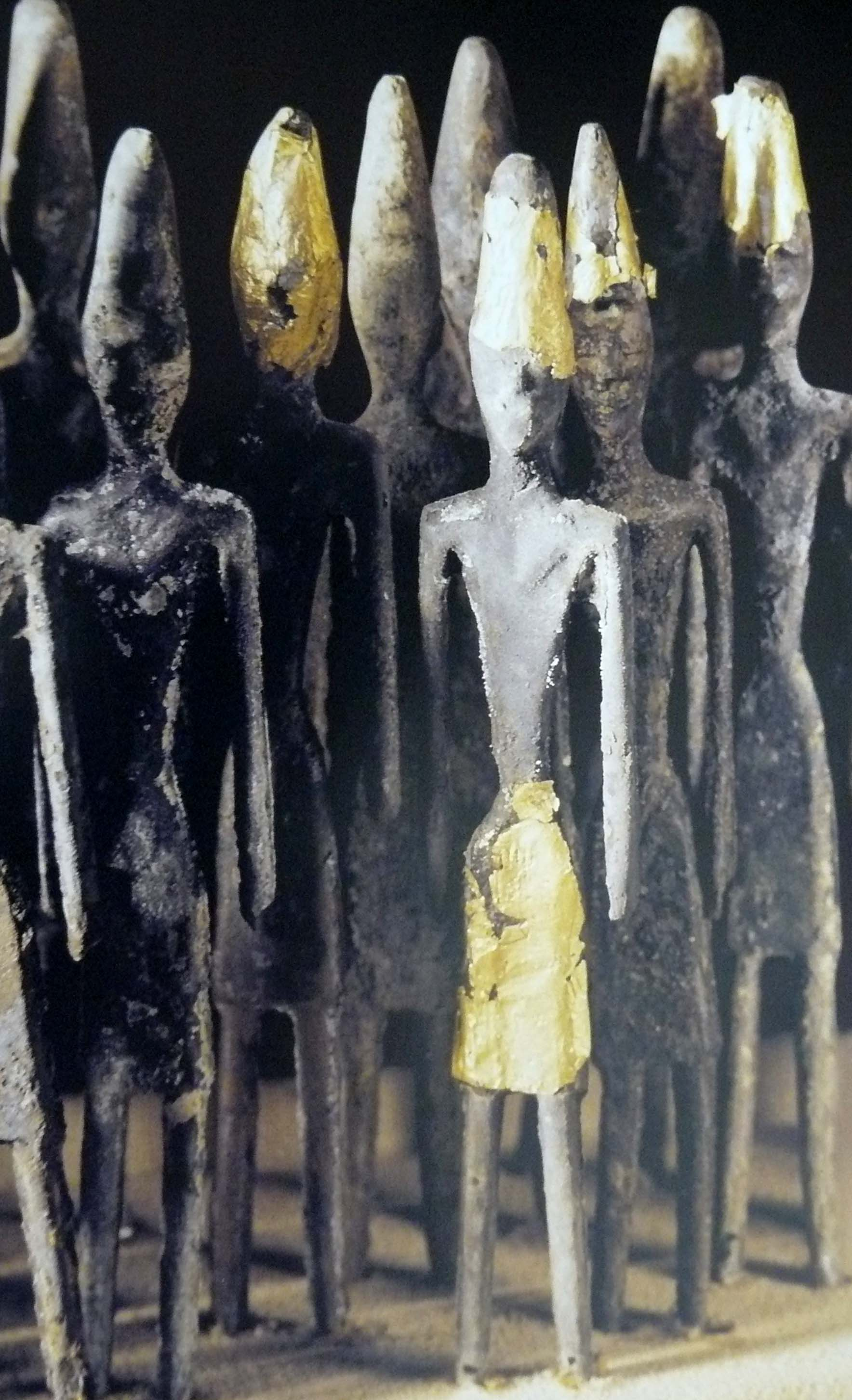
The figurines found as a votive offering in the temple of Baalat Gebal.

Baalat Gebal was the principal deity in the local pantheon of Byblos, located on the Mediterranean coast in modern Lebanon. She has been described as “the most recurrent character in the history of the city”. She was associated with commerce. A temple dedicated to her was located in the center of the settlement. It remained in use without interruption from the third millennium BCE down to the Roman period. It was the largest sanctuary in Byblos. As it is unlikely that Baalat Gebal had more than one temple in the city, the "Obelisk Temple" also identified during excavations might have been instead dedicated to a male figure connected to her. A number of sheet metal figurines have been discovered as a part of the temple votive offering in the temple of Baalat Gebal. Most are representations of men, either in conical hats or without, while a single one might be depiction of Anubis holding the was scepter. It is commonly assumed that they were produced locally, though it has also been proposed that they were imported from Egypt roughly between 2050 and 1800 BCE due to stylistic parallels with similar objects from Mentuhotep II’s tomb located at Deir el-Bahri.

Baalat Gebal was venerated by the kings of Byblos, possibly as early as in the early Bronze Age, though no individual rulers are identified in sources from that period. Rib-Addi, who reigned during the period documented in the Amarna letters, ended most of the messages he sent to the pharaoh with a wish for Baalat Gebal to protect the latter. Similar formulas appear in his letters to other Egyptian officials. A total of twenty seven instances have been identified. This habit which finds no parallels in the rest of the correspondence belonging to this text corpus. While wishes for wellbeing of the recipient were common, no other local ruler invoked his own local deity to bless the pharaoh. Furthermore, in a single case Rib-Addi presented Baalat Gebal as one of the deities the pharaoh owed his position to, which similarly is not otherwise attested for rulers of Levantine polities. It is not known if he used similar formulas in letters addressed to people from outside Egypt, as no such texts survive. In most cases he only invokes Baalat Gebal, though in a few instances she is paired with the Egyptian god Amun, who in all of these cases occur before her. It is not known how the letters were received, though Marwan Kilani speculates that the frequent references to Baalat Gebal presumably would not be perceived positively by Rib-Addi’s contemporary Akhenaton due to his religious policies. No direct references to this pharaoh’s attitude towards the goddess are known, but during his reign Byblos was not recognized in Egyptian sources as a religious center of particular importance, and played no role in what Kilani deems “Atonist ideology”.

In one letter Rib-Addi mentions a certain Ummaḫnu, the “maidservant” of Baalat Gebal, presumed to be her priestess. Apparently she attempted to play a role in the city’s foreign relations, which finds no parallel in the cases of any other religious personnel mentioned in the Amarna letters. This situation was accepted by the king, who tried to act as a middleman between the supposed priestess and the pharaoh, who she wanted to contact. Marwan Kilani notes that in contrast with sources from Egypt and Mesopotamia, references to female clergy are rare in texts from Bronze Age West Semitic speaking areas, and suggests that the fact that Byblos’ tutelary deity was a goddess rather than a god might be the reason behind Ummaḫnu’s relative prominence.

Multiple first millennium BCE kings of Byblos, including Abibaal, Elibaal and Shipitbaal, referred to themselves as protected by Baalat Gebal. Elibaal dedicated a stele to her, as indicated by the surviving inscription of this object, in which he addresses her as “his mistress”. Shipitbaal in own inscription asked her for a long reign. Another king of Byblos, Yehawmilk, who reigned in the fifth century BCE, similarly hoped Baalat Gebal would grant him a long life and reign.

=== Egyptian reception ===
There is evidence that Egyptians were involved in the cult of Baalat Gebal in Byblos. Egypt and Byblos had a long history of interactions dating back to the third millennium BCE, as recognized by local rulers such as Rib-Addi, who at one point wrote that “Byblos is not like those other cities. Byblos has been my lord the king’s loyal city from time immemorial” in a letter sent to the pharaoh. It is assumed that the temple of Baalat Gebal played a role in the political interactions between them.

An Old Kingdom relief with an Egyptian inscription referring to a monarch whose name is not preserved as the “beloved of Hathor, Lady of Byblos” has been identified during excavations of the temple of Baalat Gebal. A dedication to the same deity has also been found in the so-called Temple of the Obelisks, where it was presumably reused in the Middle Bronze Age. An inscription on a stone table from the former of the two temples mentions an endowment on her behalf made during the reign of Pepi I of the Sixth Dynasty. Later texts, dated to the reign of Thutmose III, allude to Egyptian involvement in the maintenance of her temple. The pharaoh himself mentions her in on a stela from the temple of Amun in Jebel Barkal in Nubia, which commemorates the construction of ships for a military campaign in the north from wood from the “neighborhood of the Lady of Byblos.” A reference to her might also be present in a damaged text found in the Theban tomb of one of his officials, Senneferi, which describes an expedition to Byblos. Andrés Diego Espinel notes that the Egyptian acts of devotion to Baalat Gebal might have been one of the means to secure favorable political and economic relations with local rulers, as Byblos was a major center of trade and a source of wood, oil, wine and lapis lazuli imported to Egypt.

It is presumed that Baalat Gebal was worshiped in some capacity in Egypt as well. The translation of her name, nbt-kbn, is attested as a given name, with one of its bearers being the nurse of one of Ahmose I’s daughters. Oldest examples have been identified in texts from the Middle Kingdom. It is not known if families of any of the women named nkt-kbn originated in Byblos, or if the choice of this name was influenced by the Egyptian worship of Baalat Gebal.

== Miscellaneous attestations ==
A reference to Baalat Gebal has been identified in the satirical Egyptian text known as Letter of Hori, possibly originally composed during the reign of Ramesses II, in which the eponymous figure discusses her cult center: “I will tell you of another mysterious city. Byblos is its name; what is it like? And their goddess, what is she like?” According to Marwan Kilani, is not certain if describing Byblos as “mysterious” (or alternatively: “hidden”) is an allusion to an unknown mystical or religious event, or a sarcastic figure of speech meant to highlight that the average scribe should be familiar with the city.

Baalat Gebal is also mentioned twice in a collection of Egyptian incantations, most of them directed against snakes, from the reign of Ramesses XI (BM EA 9997 + 1030). In the sixth of the preserved texts, which describes Isis healing her son Horus, who is portrayed as a child and has been bitten by a snake, she is invoked to heal the poison alongside other goddesses, such as Nephthys and Serket. Based on a restored damaged passage she is most likely identified with Hathor in this context.

For unknown reasons, Baalat Gebal is entirely absent from the Story of Wenamun, even though it describes a journey to Byblos. An implicit reference to her might only be present in the description of a sacrifice to the local deities.

In the Phoenician History of Philo of Byblos, which he presents as a Greek a translation of the works of a Phoenician author, Sanchuniathon, but which modern researchers consider to be a combination of both Phoenician and Greco-Roman elements, Baalat Gebal is referred to as Dione. Ouranos sends her and her two sisters, Astarte and Rhea, to trick and defeat their brother Kronos, but the latter instead marries them, and they subsequently give birth to his children. Ouranos most likely stands for a Phoenician deity representing heaven. Rhea is not explicitly identified with any Phoenician deity, and might be the Greek goddess. Kronos is also referred to as El elsewhere in the Phoenician History, but there is no other evidence for a consort relation between Baalat Gebal and El, and the pairing of Dione and Kronos is also unusual from Greek perspective, as the goddess bearing this name was typically associated with Zeus instead. The number and names of Dione’s children are not preserved. Later on, when Kronos assigns cities to various deities, she receives Byblos as her domain.

The temple of Baalat Gebal is mentioned in Lucian’s De Dea Syria. She is referred to as the “Byblian Aphrodite” (Greek: Ἀφροδίτης Βυβλίης). Lucian states that in Roman times rites focused on Adonis took place in her temple, which might be an echo of the worship of a possible unidentified male deity related to her, who according to Marwan Kilani was associated with the Obelisk Temple in earlier periods.
