= Favissa =

Deposit of ancient votive offerings no longer in use

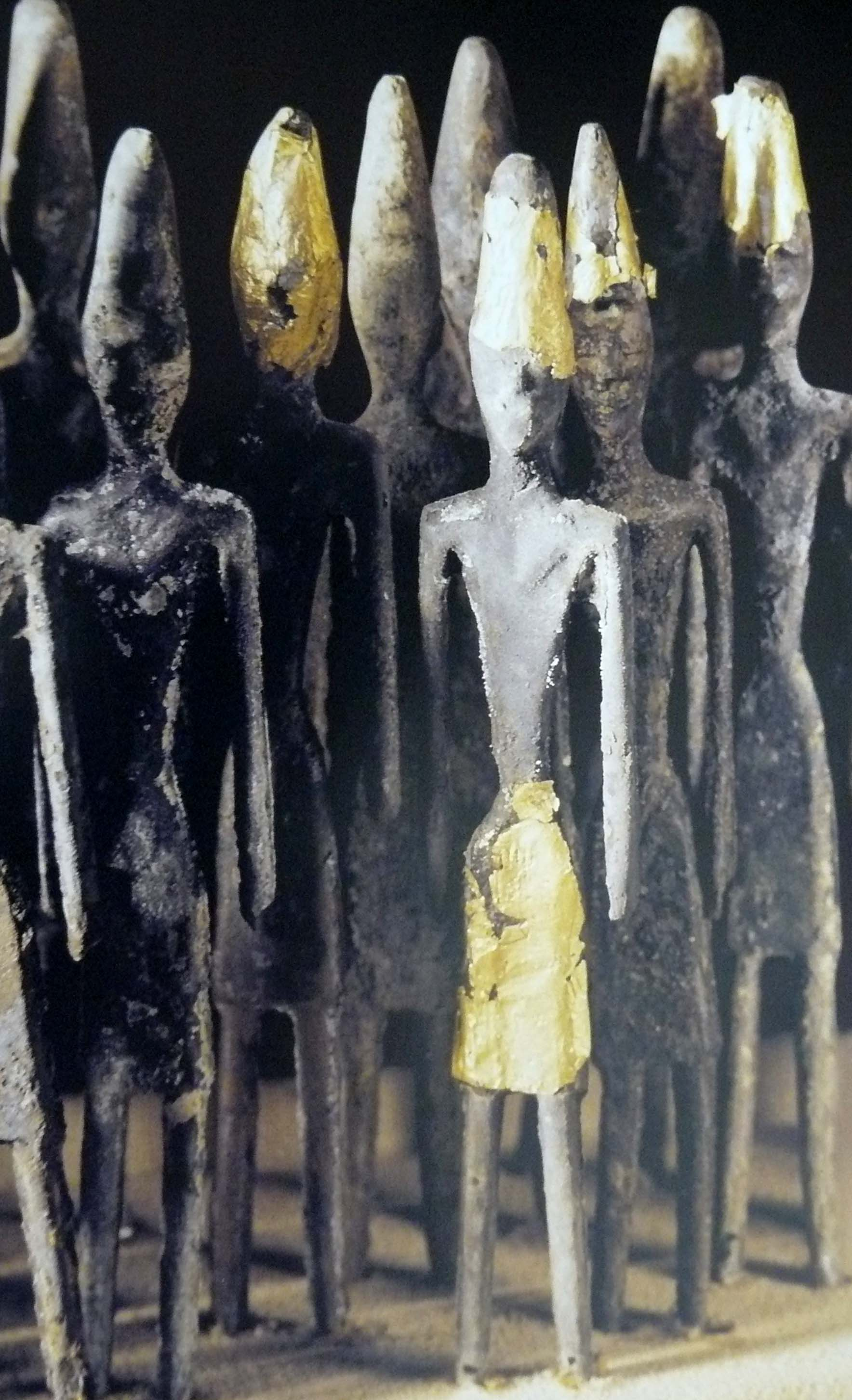
The Byblos votive figurines found in one of the favissae of the Temple of the Obelisks in Byblos

A favissa is a cultic storage place, usually a pit or an underground cellar, for sacred utensils and votive objects no longer in use. Favissae were located within the sacred temple precincts of the various ancient Mediterranean civilizations. Archaeologists have found such pits in Ancient Egypt, the Roman world and in the Phoenician and Punic world.

== Etymology ==
The term is derived from the Etruscan or related to the Latin fovea "pit".

During the time of ancient Rome, the term favissa referred to a cylindrical underground storage space, specifically designed to house votive objects. These repositories were typically located outside the main sanctuary but within the sacred grounds known as temenos. The Roman favissa served a similar purpose as the Greek treasury, functioning as a dedicated space for storing valuable offerings and dedicatory items.

== Roman favissae ==
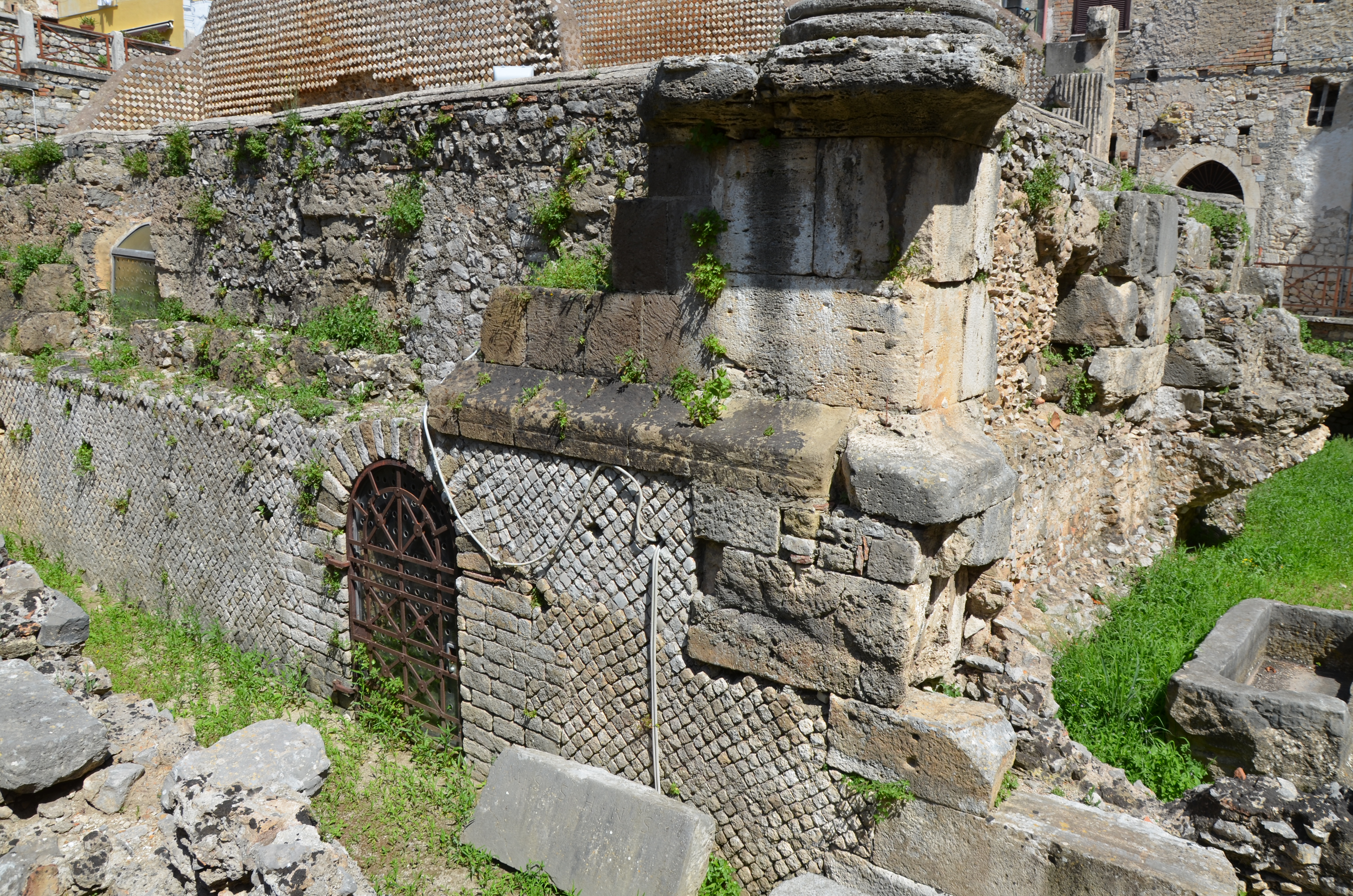
The podium of the Capitolium with the door leading to the favissae, Terracina.

Votive objects dedicated in Roman sanctuaries could retain a sacred status after they ceased to be displayed or used. Such objects were therefore sometimes deposited within the sanctuary rather than returned to ordinary circulation. Archaeological favissae can contain terracotta votives and other cult objects, some of them deliberately broken before deposition.

An example of such a structure is found in the Favissae Capitolinae, designed to house all the votive objects from the Temple of Jupiter Optimus Maximus located on Rome's Capitoline Hill. The prevalence of "favissae" is particularly notable in Magna Graecia, where they were commonly found in significant places of worship. One notable example is the favissa discovered on the Mannella hill in Locri Epizefiri in Reggio Calabria. Although devoid of its contents, this favissa can be dated back to the fifth century BC. As time passed, the use of favissae gradually diminished, to the extent that their significance had been completely forgotten by the imperial era.

== See also ==
- Bothros – Artificial depression in the ground for washing and libations

== Sources ==
- Daremberg, Charles Victor; Saglio, Edmond (1873). Dictionnaire des antiquités grecques et romaines, d'après les textes et les monuments (in French). Vol. 2 part 2. University of Ottawa. Paris : Hachette. p. 1024.
- Lacovara, Peter (2016). The World of Ancient Egypt: A Daily Life Encyclopedia [2 volumes]: A Daily Life Encyclopedia. ABC-CLIO. ISBN 978-1-61069-230-4.
- Lipinski, Edouard (2003), "Phoenician Cult Expressions in the Persian Period", Symbiosis, Symbolism, and the Power of the Past, Penn State University Press, pp. 297–308, doi:10.1515/9781575065458-022, ISBN 978-1-57506-545-8, S2CID 239182184
- Walde, Alois; Hofmann, Johann Baptist (1938). Lateinisches etymologisches Wörterbuch (in German). Heidelberg: Carl Winter. p. 467.
