= Byblos, Millennia-old City of Lebanon =

2026 exhibition of Palestinian artefacts in Paris

Coordinates: 48.8489°N 2.3572°E

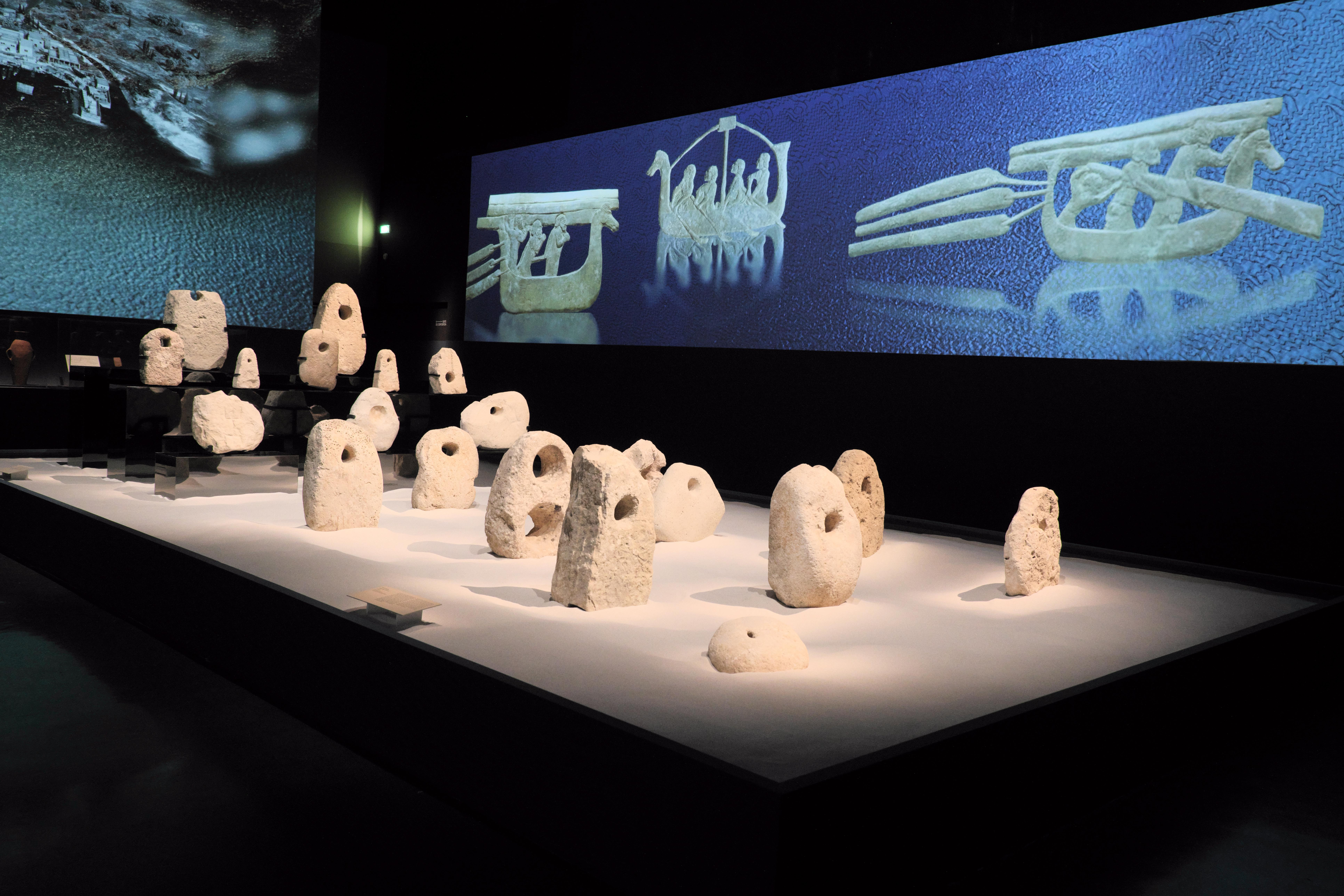
- The first room of the exhibition, featuring a selection of anchors
- Date: 24 March – 23 August 2026
- Venue: Institut du monde arabe, Paris
- Type: Exhibition
- Theme: History of Byblos
- Curator: Tania Zaven and Elodie Bouffard
- Website: imarabe.org/fr/agenda/expositions-musee/byblos-cite-millenaire-du-liban

Byblos, Millennia-old City of Lebanon (French: Byblos, cité millénaire du Liban) is an exhibition at the Institut du monde arabe (IMA) in Paris, detailing the history of Byblos in Lebanon through 400 artefacts. Almost three-quarters of the artefacts were loaned by the Directorate General of Antiquities in Lebanon. French President Emmanuel Macron opened the exhibition on 23 March 2026. The opening was attended by Ghassan Salamé, Lebanon's Minister of Culture. It was co-curated by Tania Zaven, who has directed excavations at Byblos, and Elodie Bouffard.

The exhibition had been planned for late 2024, but the Lebanon war prevented the export of artefacts; despite the delay, not all of the intended artefacts could be transported outside of Lebanon. The change in schedule led to the IMA's organising an exhibition on Gaza's cultural heritage in place of the Lebanon exhibition. Zaven edited the exhibition catalogue.

== Content ==
The exhibition consists of artefacts discovered in Byblos through Franco-Lebanese archaeological excavations. It begins with an area detailing Byblos' role in trade. At the centre of the first room was an arrangement of stone anchors from the 3rd to 1st millennia BCE. Some artefacts intended for display could not be transported to Paris, leaving gaps accompanied by labels intended for the items. The exhibition included the Osorkon Bust.

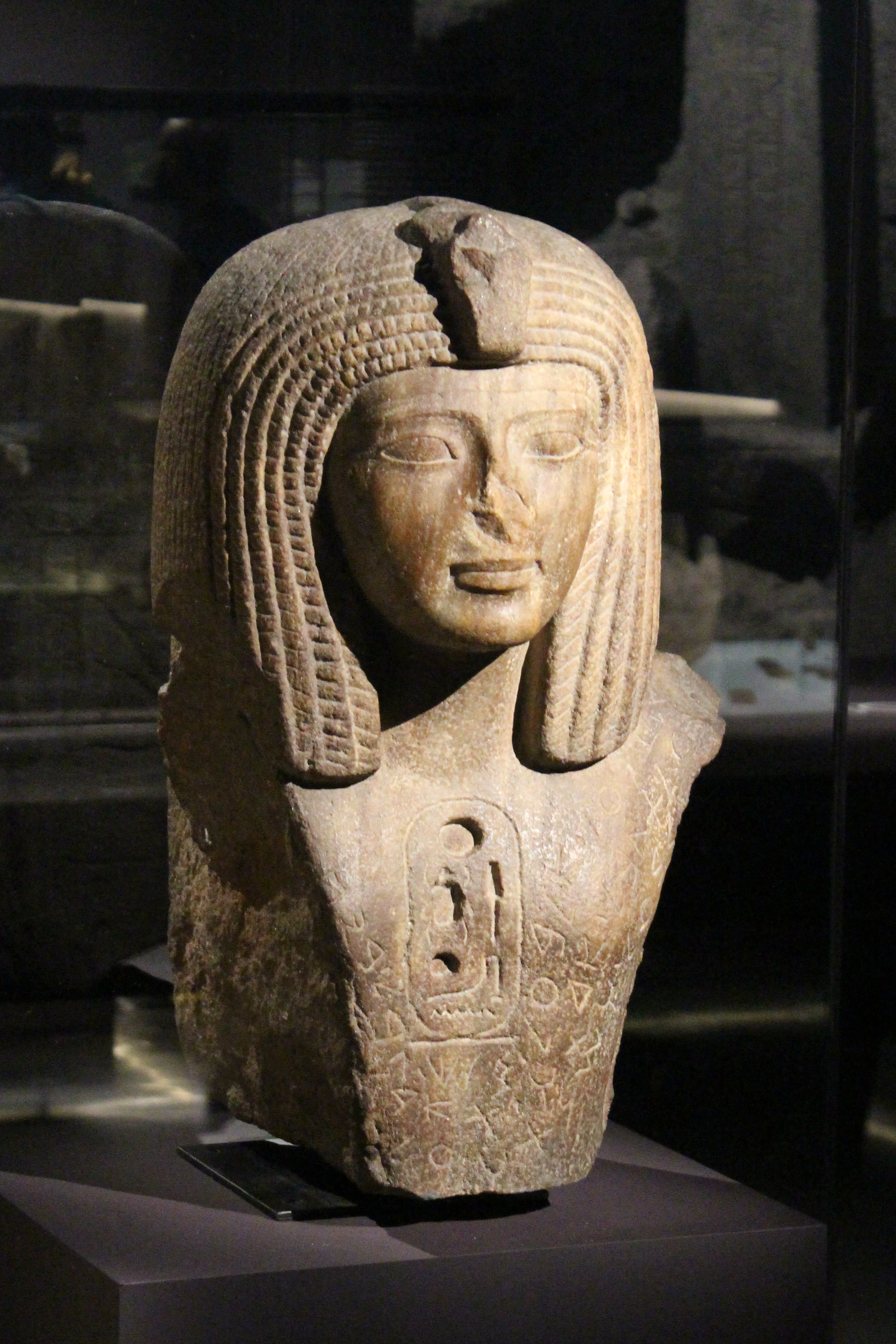
Osorkon Bust

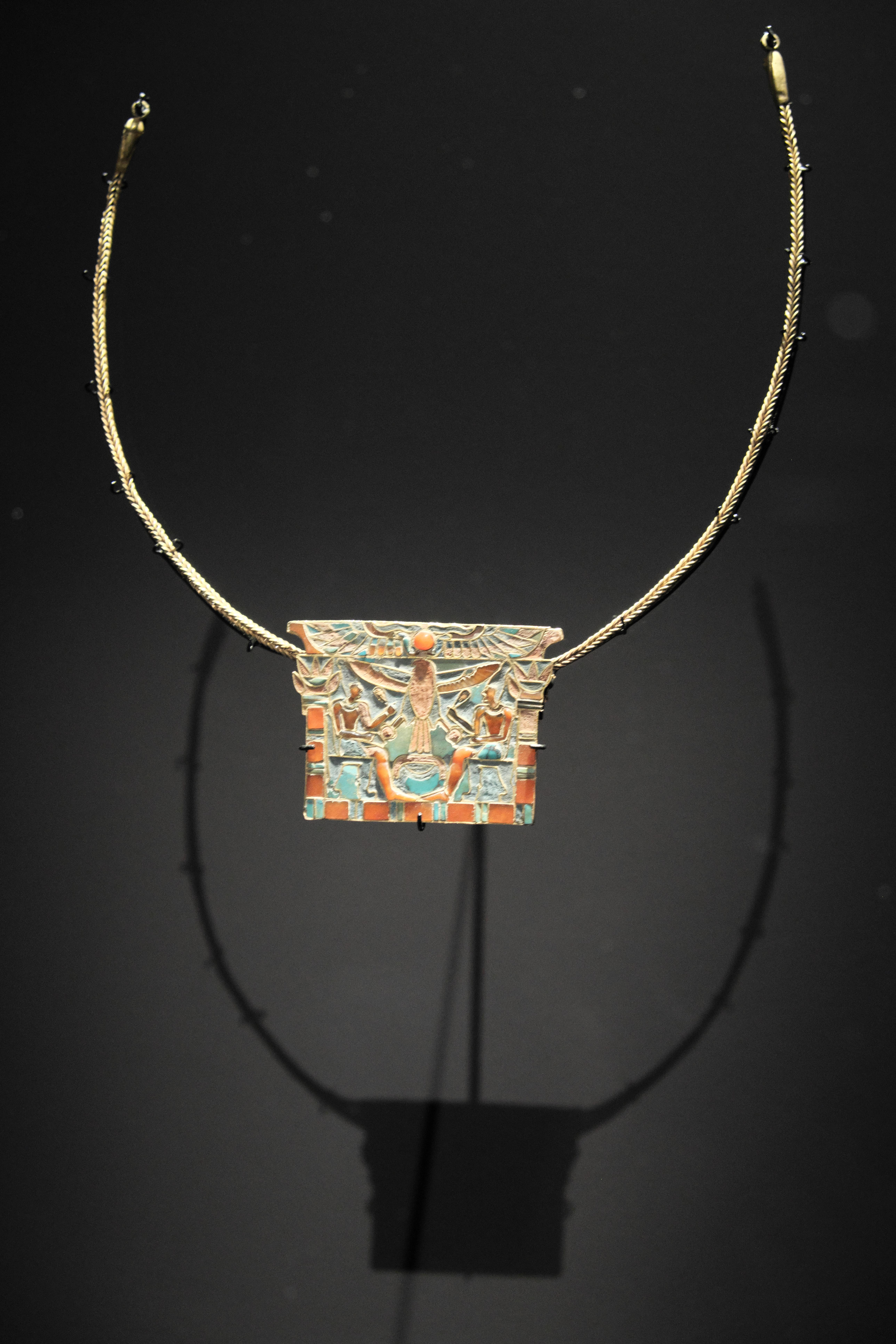

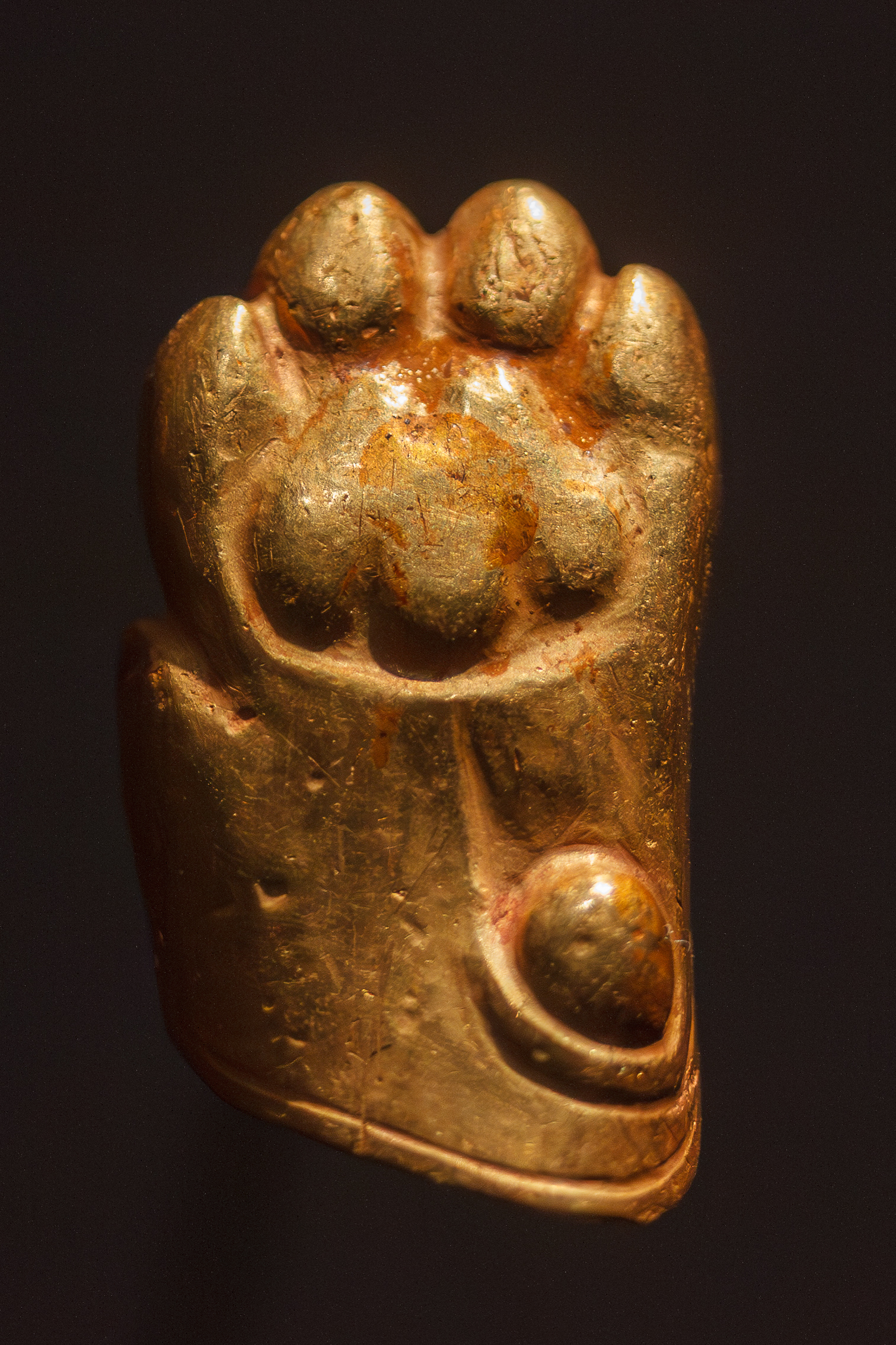
Bronze Age gold lion's paw

== See also ==
- Destruction of cultural heritage during the 2024 Israeli invasion of Lebanon
