= Bothros =

Artificial depression in the ground for washing and libations

Bothros (Greek βόθρος, plural bothroi) is the Ancient Greek word for "hole", "pit" or "trench". In contemporary use it can refer to a variety of holes or depressions found at ancient sites and referred to in literature, and has also been utilized in biological taxonomy to describe species or structures that have similar characteristics.

Trýpa (Greek τρύπα, plural trýpes) is also an Ancient Greek word for "hole" or "cavity", that typically is used for scientific naming, such as in Trypophobia.

== Historic / Archaeological uses ==
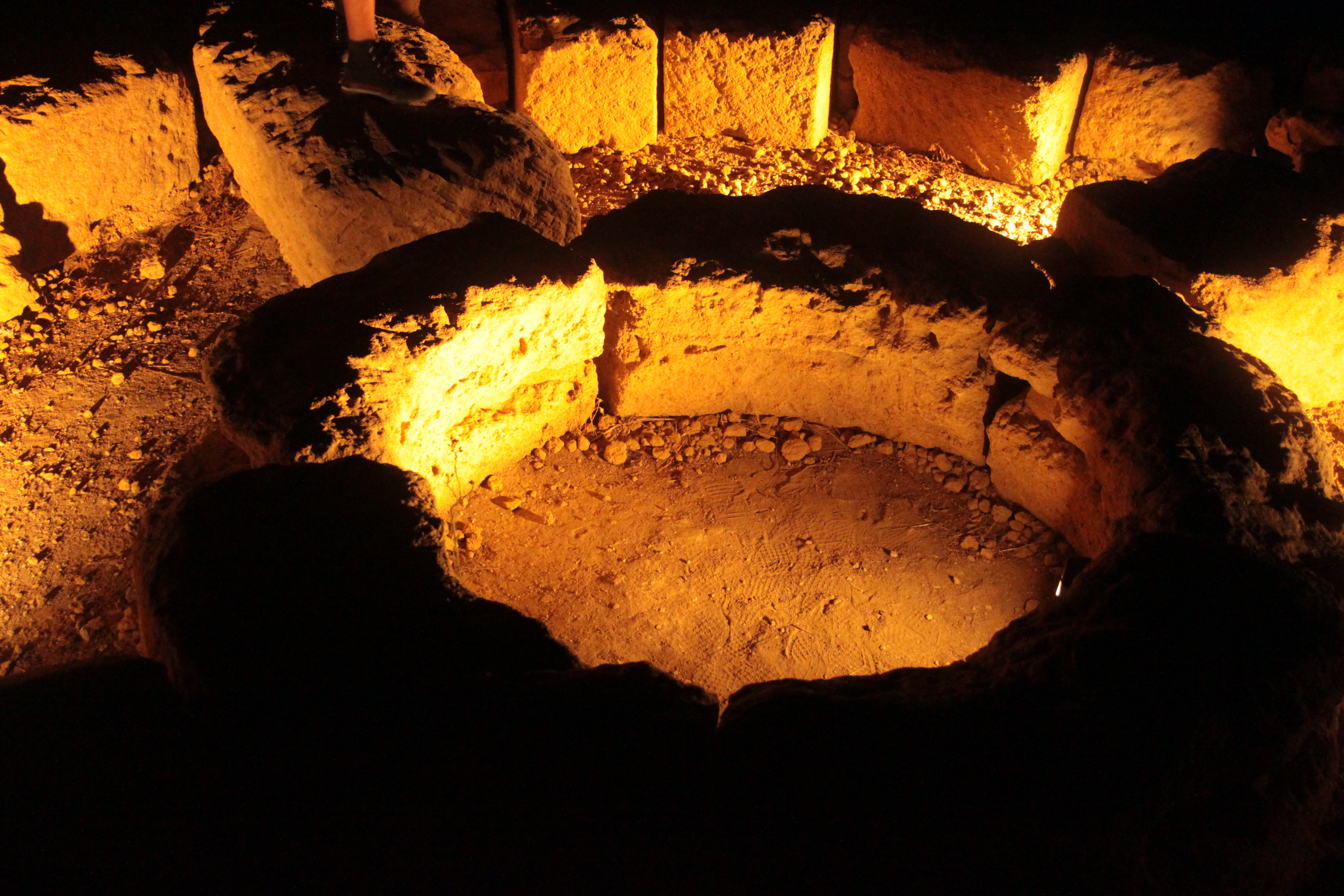
A bothros at the Temple of Demeter in the Valle dei Templi near Agrigento

In Greek antiquity, a bothros was an artificially-created or formed depression in the ground, which could serve various purposes. In archaeology, similar items are also referred to by this name and interpreted depending on their context as altars, locations for sacrifice or storage pits.

In the works of Homer, bothros generally refers to a depression or pit in the ground. In the Odyssey, the handmaidens of Nausicaa wash their clothes in one, and at the advice of Circe Odysseus digs one for the offering of libations to the dead in the underworld - first honey and milk, then wine, then water. They were also used to collect the blood of sacrificial animals that were killed above them, which was thought to attract the spirits of the dead.

Archaeological findings considered to be bothroi are often round or D-shaped, partially lined in a complicated form with stones, and can vary greatly in size and shape. When found within households they are generally interpreted as fireplaces, ovens or storage pits for grain and food storage. Sacrificial bothroi often contain remains of ceramics and bones or other intentionally-placed objects.

Bothroi are found mainly on sites from the early Bronze Age and the Iron Age in Greece. Important sites include Korakou, Gonia and Zygouries around Corinth, at Asine and in Lerna in the Argolis, in Eutresis and Orchomenos in Boeotia, where so many were found that the excavator spoke of "bothroi levels". But they also occur in the Greek colonies of southern Italy, in Etruria, Dacia and Macedonia .

As many of them were in use over a period of several generations, they can provide additional archaeological value, as the sequence from the recent upper findings to the older, deeper lying finds gives important clues for the relative chronology of the found objects.

In Italian, such a pit is known as a favissa (plural favissae).

== In biology ==
Reflecting its meaning of "recess" or "pit" bothros has been incorporated into the names of species and structures in biological taxonomy which show similar features. This includes pit vipers such as Bothriechis, Bothrops asper and Diphyllobothrium (from Greek bothrion = small pit, diminutive of bothros).
