= Yehawmilk Stele =

5th-century BC Phoenician inscription

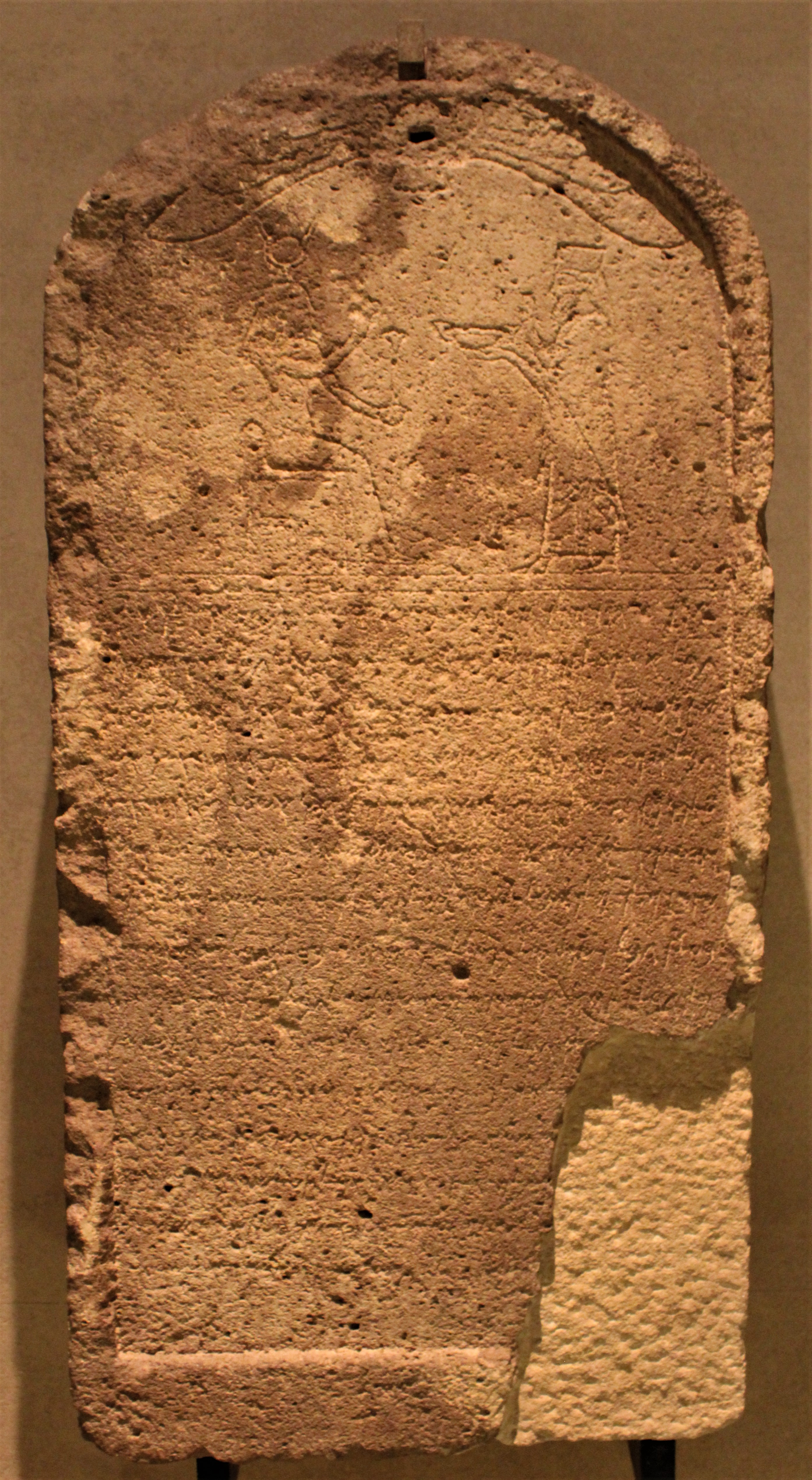
The stele, today listed at AO 22368 at the Louvre.

The Yehawmilk stele, de Clercq stele, or Byblos stele, also known as KAI 10 and CIS I 1, is a Phoenician inscription from c.450 BC found in Byblos at the end of Ernest Renan's Mission de Phénicie. (Note: Renan described it as follows: "Depuis la mission, un important monument égypto-phénicien a été trouvé très-près des tranchées que nous fîmes sur la colline de Gébeil. C'est une stèle en calcaire blanc, peu dur, de 1m, 14 de haut sur 0m, 56 de large, mentionnant une offrande faite par un roi de Byblos à Baalath-Gébeil, représentée en Isis. Il est à souhaiter qu'on publie le plus tôt possible l'inscription phénicienne de quinze lignes qui accompagne le monument. Voici ce que M. Péretié a la bonté de m'écrire sur cetle découverte: «Je ne suis point allé moi-même sur les lieux, dans la crainte d'éveiller l'attention, toujours fàcheuse en pareil cas, de l'autorité locale, surtout depuis les derniers règlements; mais d'après tous les rapports qui m'ont été faits, et que j'ai lieu de croire exacts, la stèle qui porte l'inscription a été trouvée à environ 25 ou 30 mètres de l'angle sud-est du château de Gébeil, tout près d'une maison située en face de ce même angle, et qui doit être le bâtiment qui termine, au sud, l'endroit indiqué sur le plan de la planche XIX de la Mission de Phénicie, comme présentant des «vestiges de constructions anciennes.» C'est en creusant la terre devant cette maison, pour planter quelques arbres, que le propriétaire, un musulman, découvrit une sorte de porte sur le seuil de laquelle se trouvait la pierre en question. Elle était debout, placée entre deux lions, ou pour mieux dire entre deux avant-corps de lions; l'un taillé verticalement à 10 centimètres de la crinière, l'autre presque entier, sauf une cassure vers la queue, et tous deux ayant le long du dos, à partir du cou, une sorte de plate-bande en saillie, destinée peut-être.à supporter la stèle. — Ces lions ont la gueule ouverte; ils sont d'un grand et vigoureux caractère, et paraissent avoir été taillés dans la même pierre que là stèle.") Yehawmilk (Phoenician 𐤉𐤇𐤅𐤌𐤋𐤊), king of Byblos, dedicated the stele to the city’s protective goddess Ba'alat Gebal.

It was first published in full by Melchior de Vogüé in 1875. In the early 1930s, the bottom right corner of the stele was discovered by Maurice Dunand. The main part of the stele is in the Louvre, whilst the bottom right part is in the storerooms of the National Museum of Beirut and has never been on public display.

== Text of the inscription ==
The inscription reads:

(line 1-2)	’NK YḤWMLK MLK GBL BN YḤRB‘L BN BN ’RMLK MLK / GBL	I am Yehawmilk, King of Byblos, the son of Yeharbaal, grandson of Urimilk, King of Byblos,
(2)	’Š P‘LTN HRBT B‘LT GBL MMLKT ‘L GBL	whom Baalat Gebal made king of Byblos.
(2-3)	WQR’ ’NK / ’T RBTY B‘LT GBL WŠM‘ [H’] QL	I call to my Lady of Byblos, and [She] hears (my) voice.
(3-4)	WP‘L ’NK LRBTY B‘LT / GBL HMZBḤ NḤŠT ZN ’Š BḤ[ṢR]H Z	I built for my Lady Baalat Gebal that bronze altar that is in this cou[rt-temple] of Hers,
(4-5)	WHPTḤ ḤRṢ ZN ’Š / ‘L PN PTḤY Z	and that gold engraving that is opposite this inscription of mine,
(5)	WH‘PT ḤRṢ ’Š BTKT ’BN ’Š ‘L PTḤ ḤRṢ ZN	and that gold bird that is on the stone «TKT» (pillar?) that is next to that gold engraving,
(6)	WH‘RPT Z’ W‘MDH WHR[’]ŠM ’Š ‘LHM WMSPNTH	and that portico and its columns, and the ca[pi]tals upon them, and its ceiling.
(6-7)	P‘L ’NK / YḤWMLK MLK GBL LRBTY B‘LT GBL	I, Yehawmilk, King of Byblos, made (this work) for my Lady Baalat Gebal.
(7-8)	KM ’Š QR’T ’T RBTY / B‘LT GBL WŠM‘ QL WP‘L LY N‘M	When I call to my Lady Baalat Gebal, She hears my voice, and does good things to me.
(8-9)	TBRK B‘LT GBL ’YT YḤWMLK / MLK GBL	May Baalat Gebal bless Yehawmilk, King of Byblos.
(9)	WTḤWW WT’RK YMW WŠNTW ‘L GBL	And may She grant him long life, and may She prolong his days and years (as king) over Byblos.
(9)	K MLK ṢDQ H’	For he is a righteous king.
(9-10)	WTTN / [LW HRBT B]‘LT GBL ḤN L‘N ’LNM WL‘N ‘M ’RṢ Z	May [the Lady Ba]alt of Byblos grant [him] favor in the eyes of the gods and in the eyes of the people of this land,
(10-11)	WḤN ‘M ’R-Ṣ / Z [WḤN L‘N] KL MMLKT	and may She grant favor to the people of this land, [and favor in the eyes of] the whole kingdom.
(11-12)	WKL ’DM ’Š YSP LP‘L ML’KT ‘LT MZ-BḤ / ZN	And as for any person who shall continue to work on this altar
(12)	[W‘LT PT]Ḥ ḤRṢ ZN W‘LT ‘RPT Z’	[and on] this gold [engrav]ing and on this portico,
(12-13)	ŠM ’NK YḤWMLK / MLK GBL [TŠT ’T]K ‘L<T> ML’KT H’	my name, «Yehawmilk, King of Byblos», [will you place, together with] your own (name), upon that work.
(13-14)	W’M ’BL TŠT ŠM ’TK W’M TS-R / M[L’]KT Z’	If you do not place my name with yours (upon it), or if you remove this w[or]k,
(14)	[WTS]G ’T [PTḤY] Z DL YSDH ‘LT MQM Z	[or if you mo]ve this [inscription of mine] and its base from this spot,
(14-15)	WTGL / MSTRW	or if you reveal its hiding-place,
(15)	TSRḤ[W] HRBT B‘LT GBL ’YT H’DM H’ WZR‘W	the Lady Baalat Gebal shall make that man and his progeny stink
(16)	’T PN KL ’LN G[BL]	before all the gods of By[blos] (i.e., She will make them disgusted by the gods).
