= Temple of Baalat Gebal =

Temple in Byblos

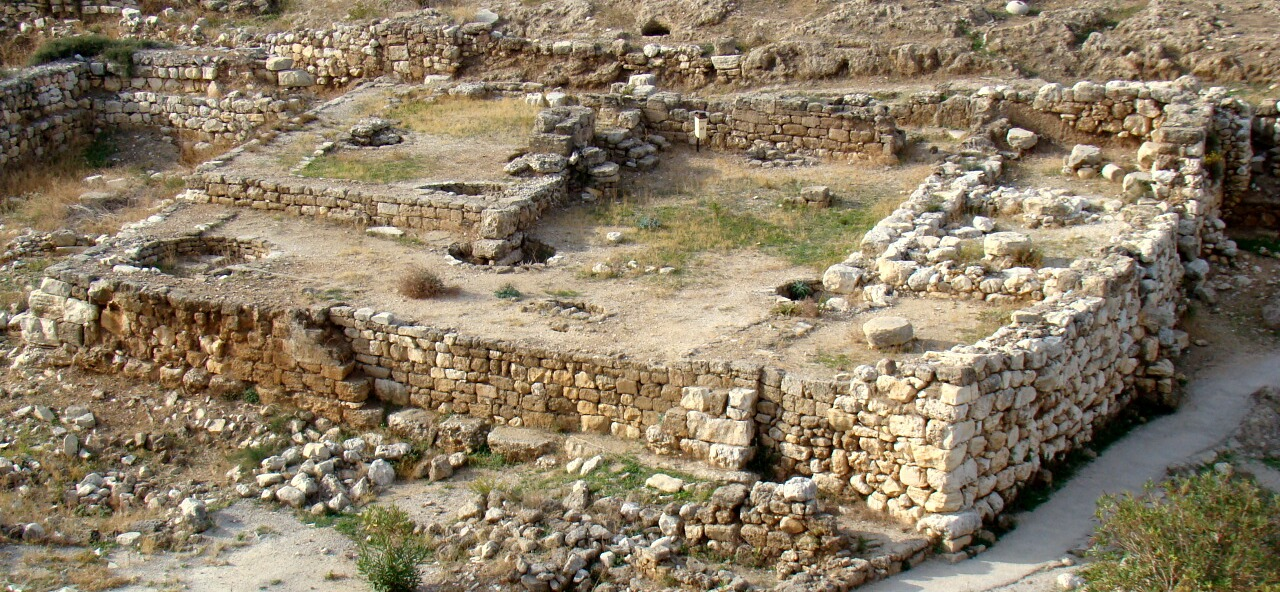
- The temple in 2010

- Location in Lebanon
- 34°07′09″N 35°38′45″E
- Type: Temple
- Location: Byblos, Keserwan-Jbeil, Lebanon

History
- Built: c. 2800 BC

Site notes
- Material: Stone
- Excavation dates: 1922

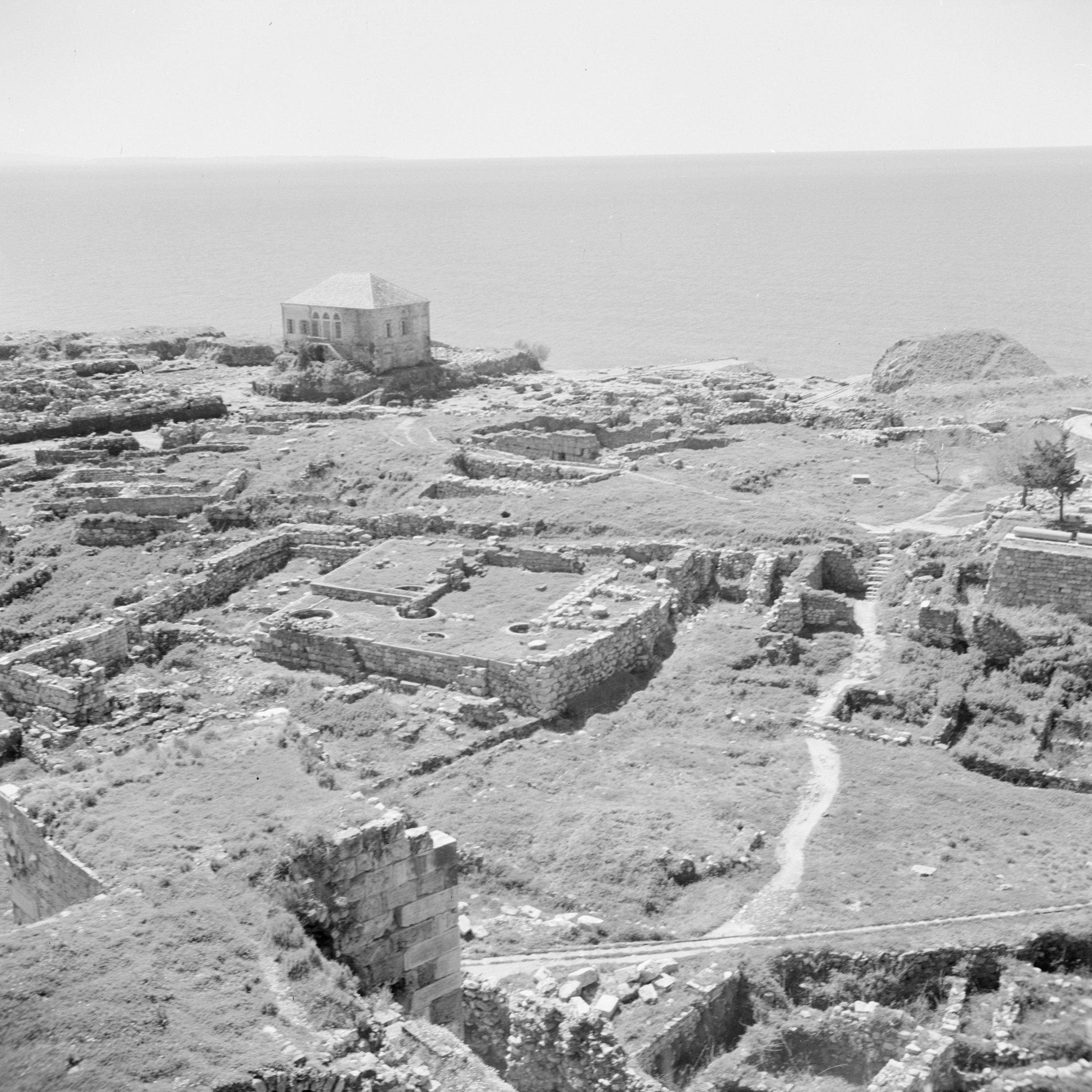
The temple excavations in 1950

The Temple of Baalat Gebal (Arabic: معبد بعلة جبيل, romanized: Maʿbad Baʿlat Jbeil) was an important Bronze Age temple in the World Heritage Site of Byblos. The temple was dedicated to Ba'alat Gebal, the goddess of the city of Byblos. Built around 2800 BC, it was the largest and most important sanctuary in ancient Byblos, and is considered to be "one of the first monumental structures of the Syro-Palestinian region". Two centuries after the construction of the Temple of Baalat Gebal, the Temple of the Obelisks was built approximately 100m to the east.

The length and continuity of its history as an active temple is "remarkable" and "supports its centrality in the life of the city".

An important group of Byblos figurines were found in the temple; these figurines have become the "poster child" of the Lebanese Tourism Ministry.

== Background ==
The temple, and its patroness, Ba‘alat Gebal, were venerated in the city for more than two millennia during the Canaanite and Phoenician eras. It was constructed when Byblos had close ties with Egypt, and a number of Egyptian references are found throughout the temple complex. The temple itself was expanded a number of times and remained in use until the Roman era.

== Architecture ==
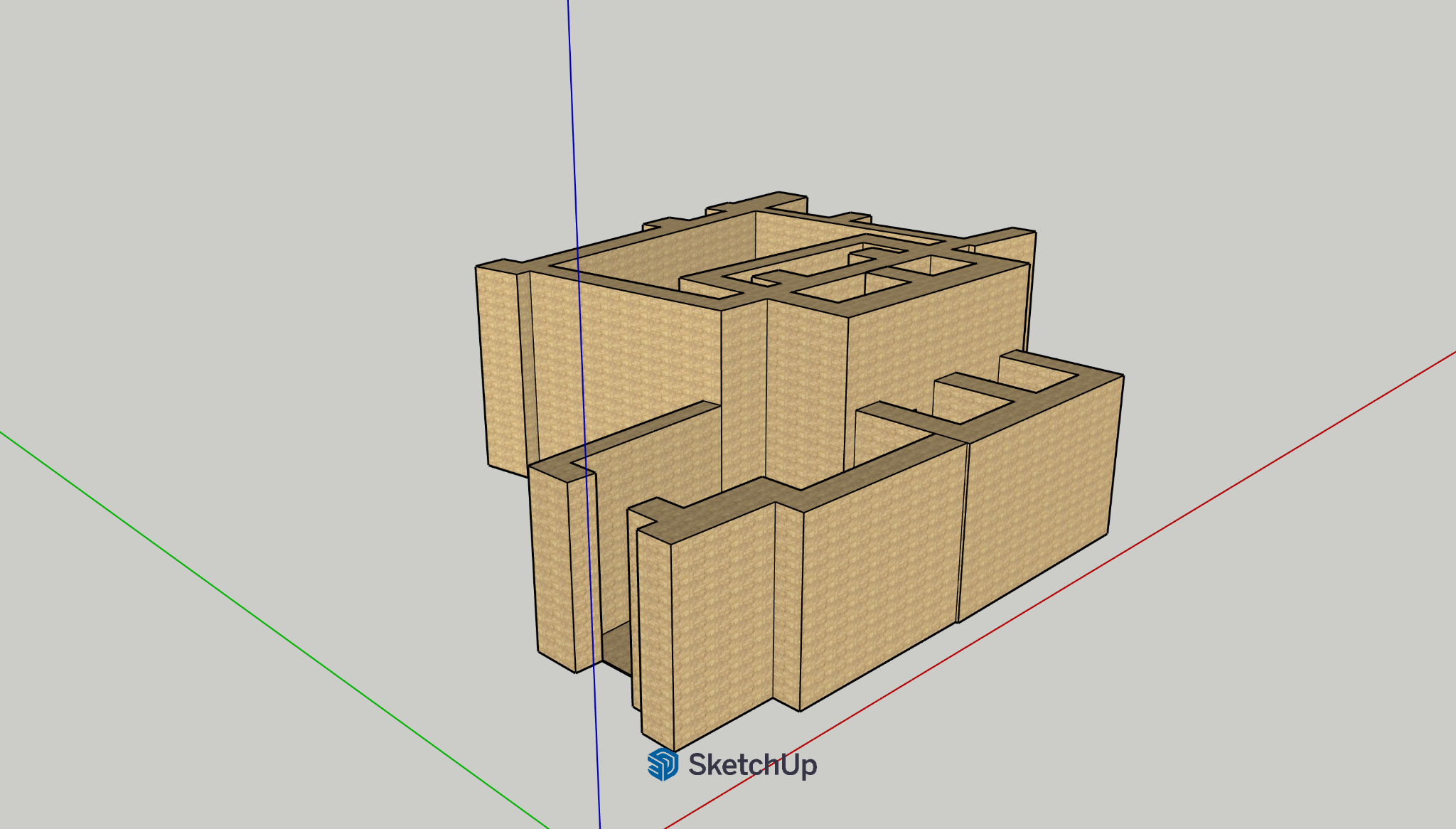
Screenshot of a 3D Model of a Reconstruction of the Temple

The Temple of Baʿalat Gebal was the principal sanctuary of the ancient city of Byblos (modern-day Jbeil, Lebanon), dedicated to the city's patron goddess Baʿalat Gebal, the “Lady of Byblos.” Her identity has been debated among historians and archaeologists, with some equating her to Egyptian goddesses such as Hathor or Isis, while others argue she was a distinct Levantine deity unique to Byblos.

The temple was constructed around 3000 BCE, as suggested by a diorite vase fragment inscribed with the symbol of Pharaoh Khasekhemui, found within the sanctuary. Measuring approximately 60 × 40 meters, the temple occupied the highest point of the city's sacred sector and was surrounded by a ritual well. Its layout included a series of accessory rooms and a single southern exit. An Egyptian-style colossus stood either inside or in front of the temple, further emphasizing Egyptian influence.

The sanctuary underwent several phases of construction. During the KIII phase (Egyptian 4th–5th Dynasties), the Hypostyle Temple was built, employing techniques similar to those at the Saqqara complex of Netjererkhet Djoser. In the KIV phase (Egyptian 6th–11th Dynasties), a more complex structure known as Bâtiment XL was erected over the Hypostyle Temple, with architectural parallels to Sahure's valley temple at Abusir. Cultic furniture included flat-topped circular tables made of alabaster and calcite, considered concrete evidence of Egyptian religious influence.

Constructed primarily of stone masonry, the temple's textured surfaces and monumental scale reflected Levantine traditions while incorporating Egyptian elements. Numerous Egyptian artifacts with pharaonic symbols were discovered, indicating Byblos’ role as a major hub for the export of cedar wood, resins, and wine to Egypt. The temple thus functioned not only as a religious center but also as an intermediary between Egypt and Byblos, symbolizing the city's political and commercial importance in the Bronze Age Levant.

== Modern identification and excavation ==
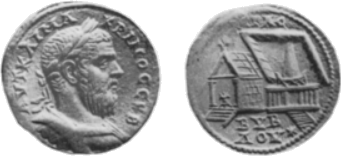
Roman emperor Macrinus coin showing the temple of Baalat Gebal and its sacred enclosure, the only surviving depiction of the temple

The site of the temple is near the Crusaders' Byblos Castle, and was first excavated by French archaeologist Pierre Montet from 1921 to 1924 and subsequently in the early part of Maurice Dunand's excavation of the city. Montet published two sketches of his excavations, and Dunand published a few plans for the wider sector of excavations in his 1939 volume. Almost all of the artifacts found in the excavation of the temple are displayed at the National Museum of Beirut.

The temple now sits east of the Roman theater. The theater, built around 218, was reconstructed and moved to allow excavation of the temple site.

== Gallery ==
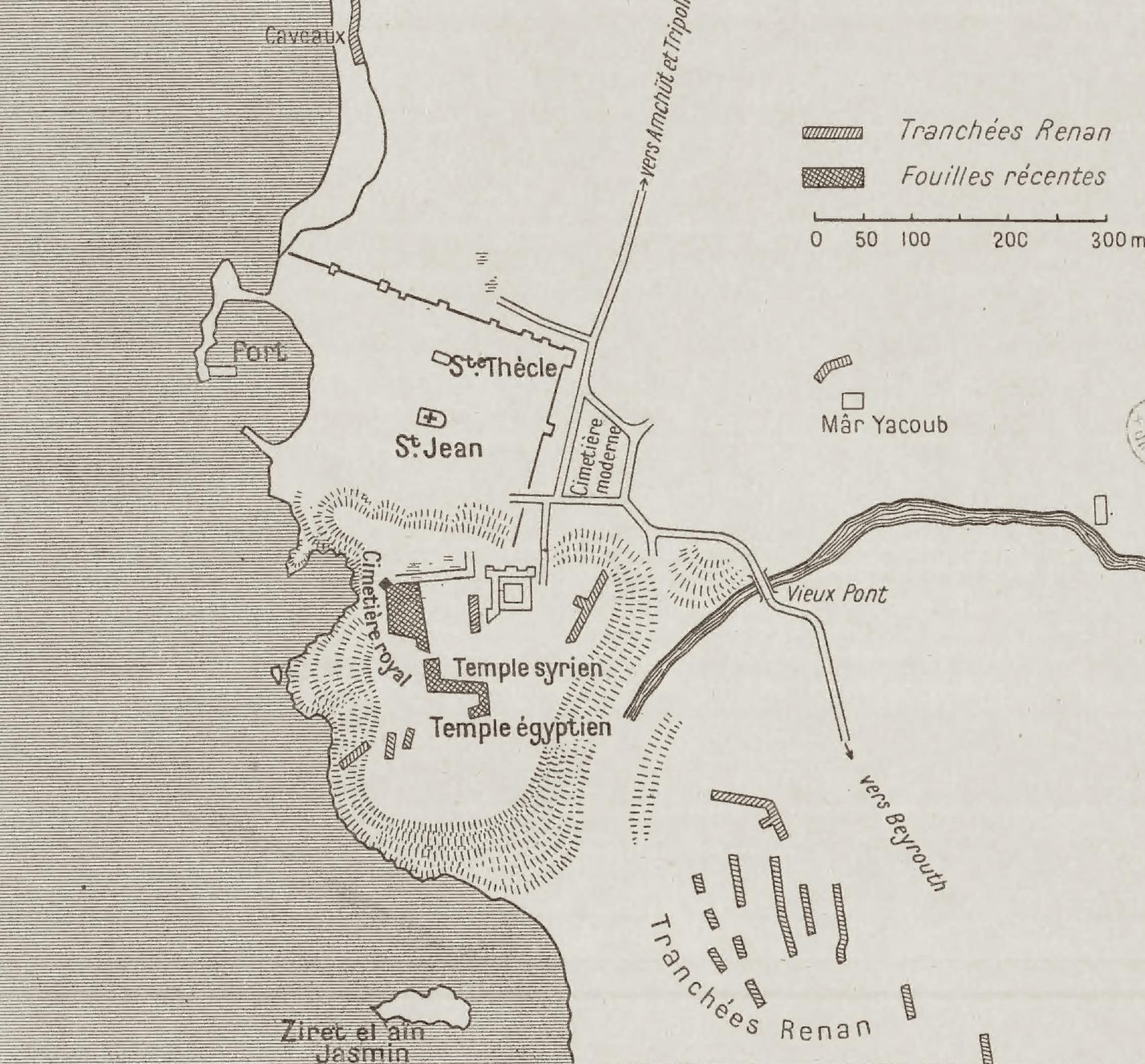
Montet's 1924 diagram of the Byblos archaeological site

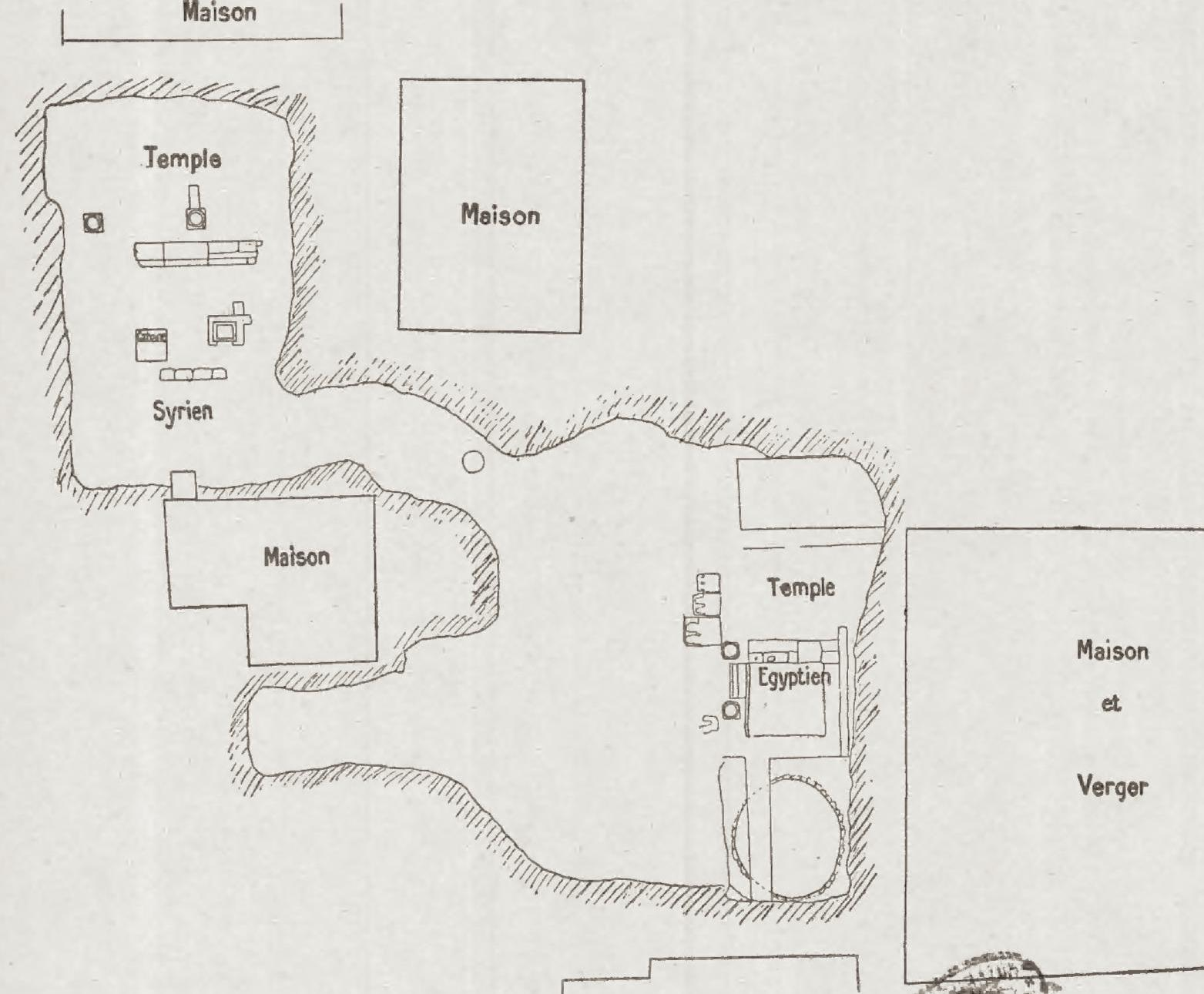
Montet's 1924 diagram of the Byblos temples

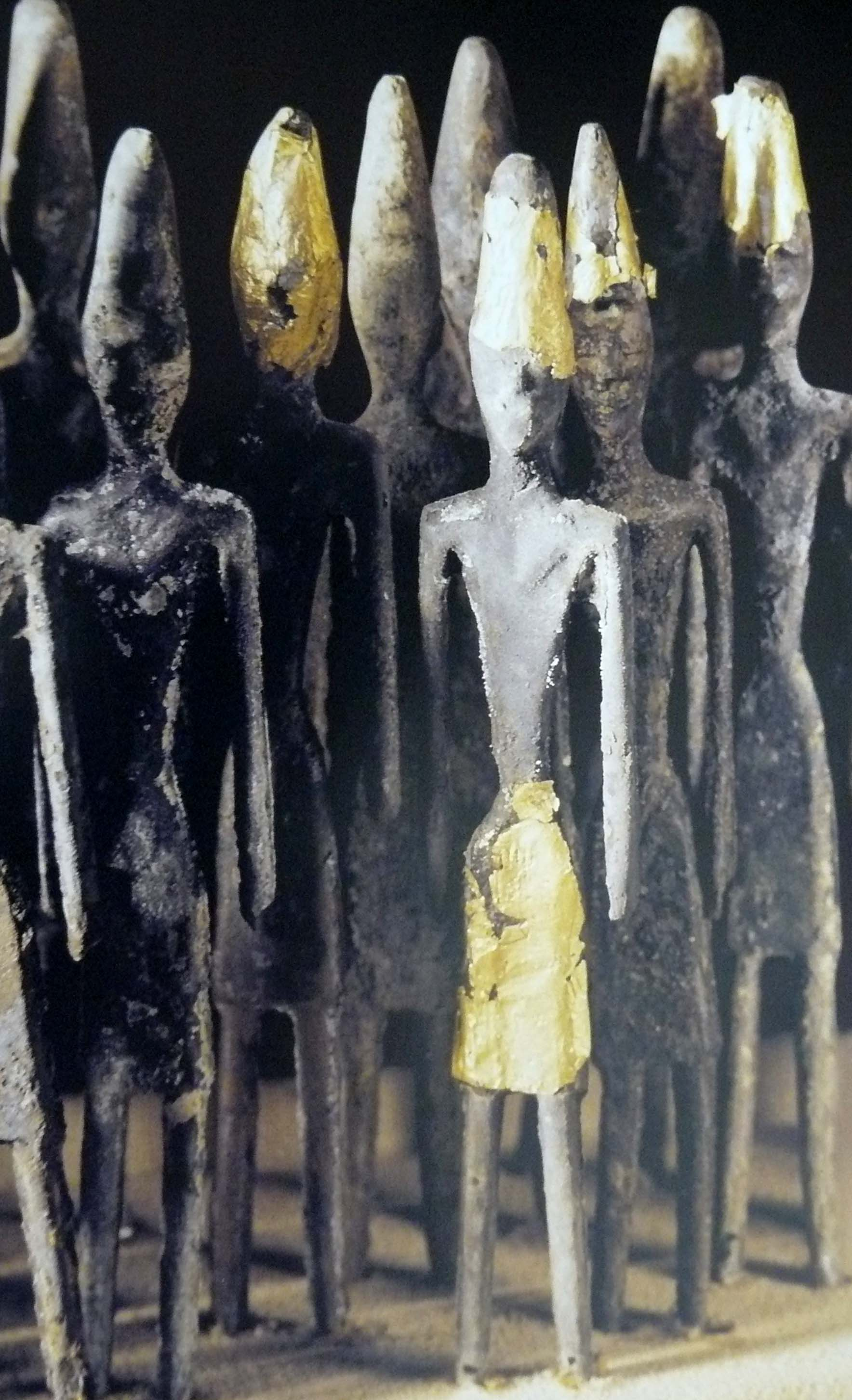
The Byblos figurines

== See also ==
Royal necropolis of Byblos – Phoenician necropolis in Lebanon
