= Byblos figurines =

Statuettes found in ancient Phoenician temples

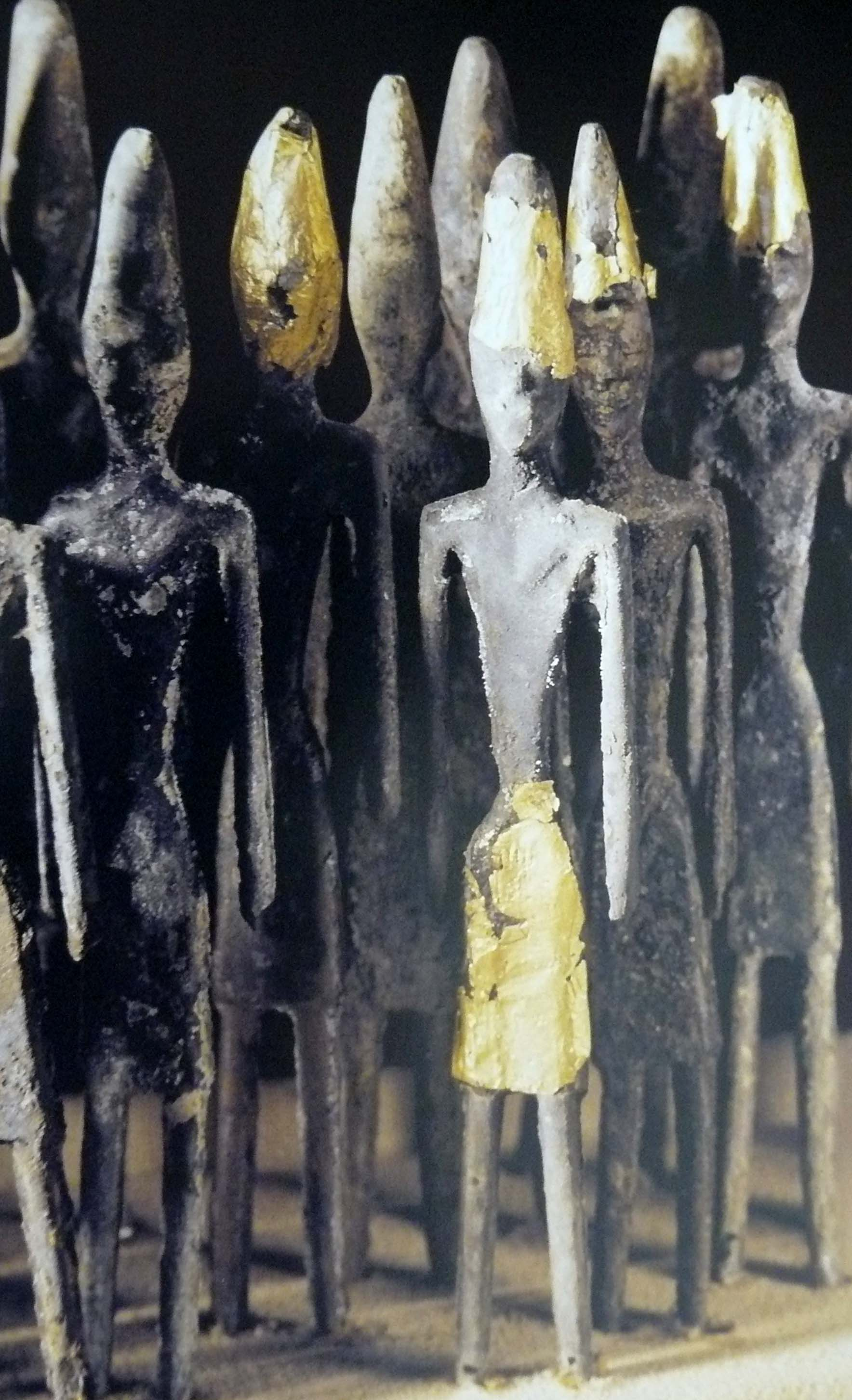
The Byblos figurines

The Byblos figurines or Phoenician statuettes are approximately 1,500–2,000 ex-voto statuettes found in ancient Phoenician temples in Lebanon, primarily in Byblos, but also in Kamid al lawz. The statuettes date to the second millennium BC and are made of bronze, silver, or copper alloy. The Byblos figurines are considered to represent the best example of their kind across the Levant.

Most of the figurines were found in the Temple of the Obelisks, in which 20 votive deposits and pitchers containing a variety of such figurines were found, along with a smaller, but important group of them found in the neighboring Temple of Baalat Gebal. The figurines have been adopted to represent the Lebanese Tourism Ministry.

== Use ==
The majority of the statuettes were found at archaeological sites in sealed pottery jars, together with tools, weapons, jewelry, and other ritual objects.

The first group found was located at the Temple of Baalat Gebal and information about them was published by archaeologists Pierre Montet and Maurice Dunand. Both originally considered the figurines to be "foundation deposits". Following further discoveries at the Temple of the Obelisks, Dunand suggested that perhaps, they might be assemblages of "offering deposits" for festivals. In 1966, however, Negbi and Moskowitz suggested instead, that the various objects discovered were hidden away in haste, ahead of an impending catastrophe.

== Description ==
The statuettes measure 3–38 cm tall, mostly represent males, and have tangs projecting from their feet that would have allowed them to be placed onto bases. Most wear cone-shaped hats resembling the labbade while some resemble the Egyptian hedjet and others wear helmets, signaling an intensification of relations with Egypt during the Twelfth and Thirteenth Dynasties. Some are nude and others wear short kilts. Originally, many were armed with a stick, dagger, mace, or axe. Based on an inscription on a large obelisk at the Temple of the Obelisks, the male ones are interpreted to resemble Resheph, the Phoenician deity of war and plague.

The figurines have been described as "crude, stereotyped, mass-produced". It is likely that they were produced in Byblos to be used as ritual offerings. Moulds for similar, but less numerous styles of statuettes, were found at the Phoenician excavations at Nahariya.

They are interpreted as votive offerings because they were not found in graves and were not dispersed widely enough to be part of exchange networks. The Lebanese archaeologist Maurice Chehab formulated a suggestive hypothesis about these figurines saying that "a good number of statuettes, placed in these vases, are depicted in full motion and wearing the lebbadé or conical cap, which is still in use in certain regions of Lebanese high mountain. This headdress was held on the head by a chinstrap. One of the ex-votos included several dozen of these statuettes so similar that one can imagine that they represented a troop that would have offered their sponsors [effigies] to the temple before embarking."

== Gallery ==
=== National Museum of Beirut ===
The figurines on display at the National Museum of Beirut are pictured below:

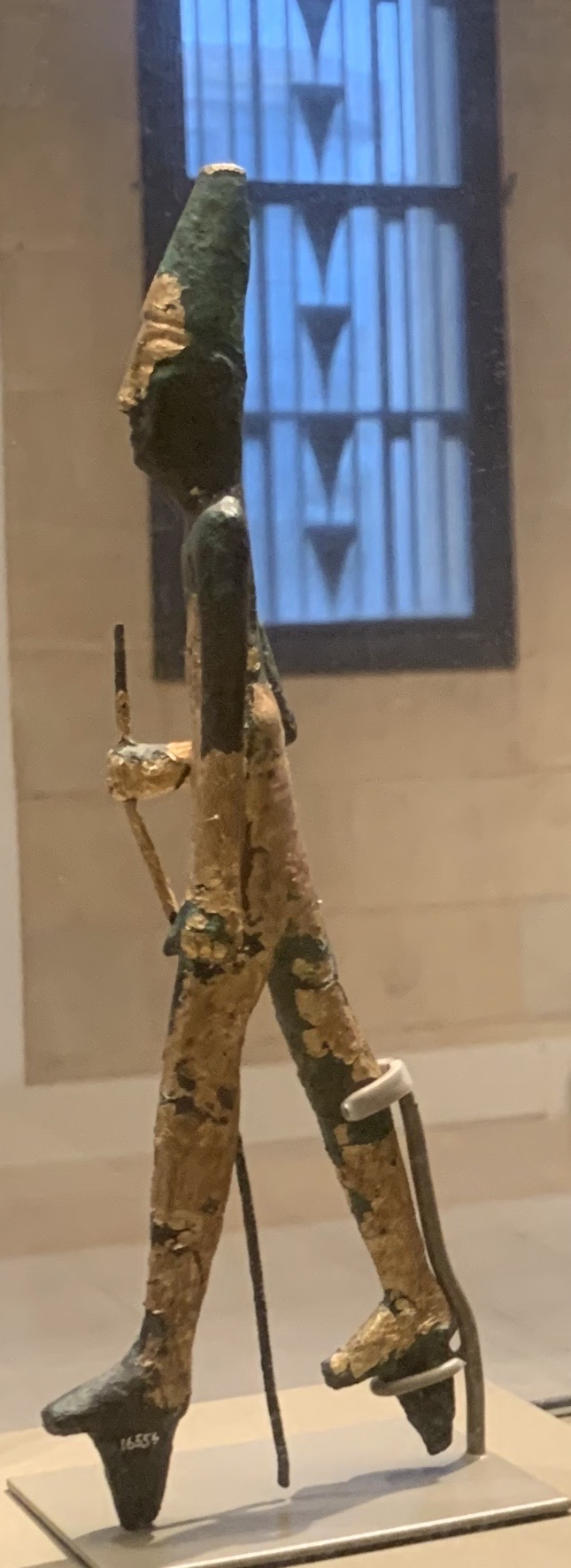
Figurine from the National Museum of Beirut

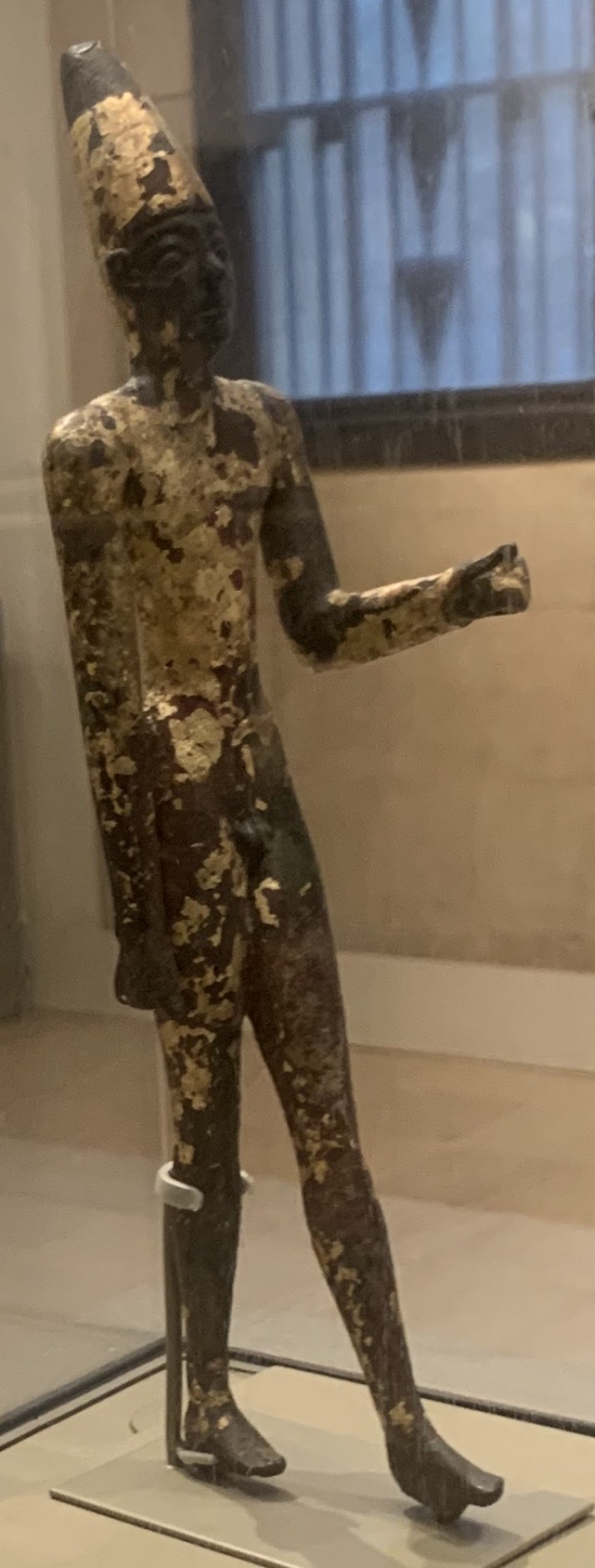
Figurine from the National Museum of Beirut

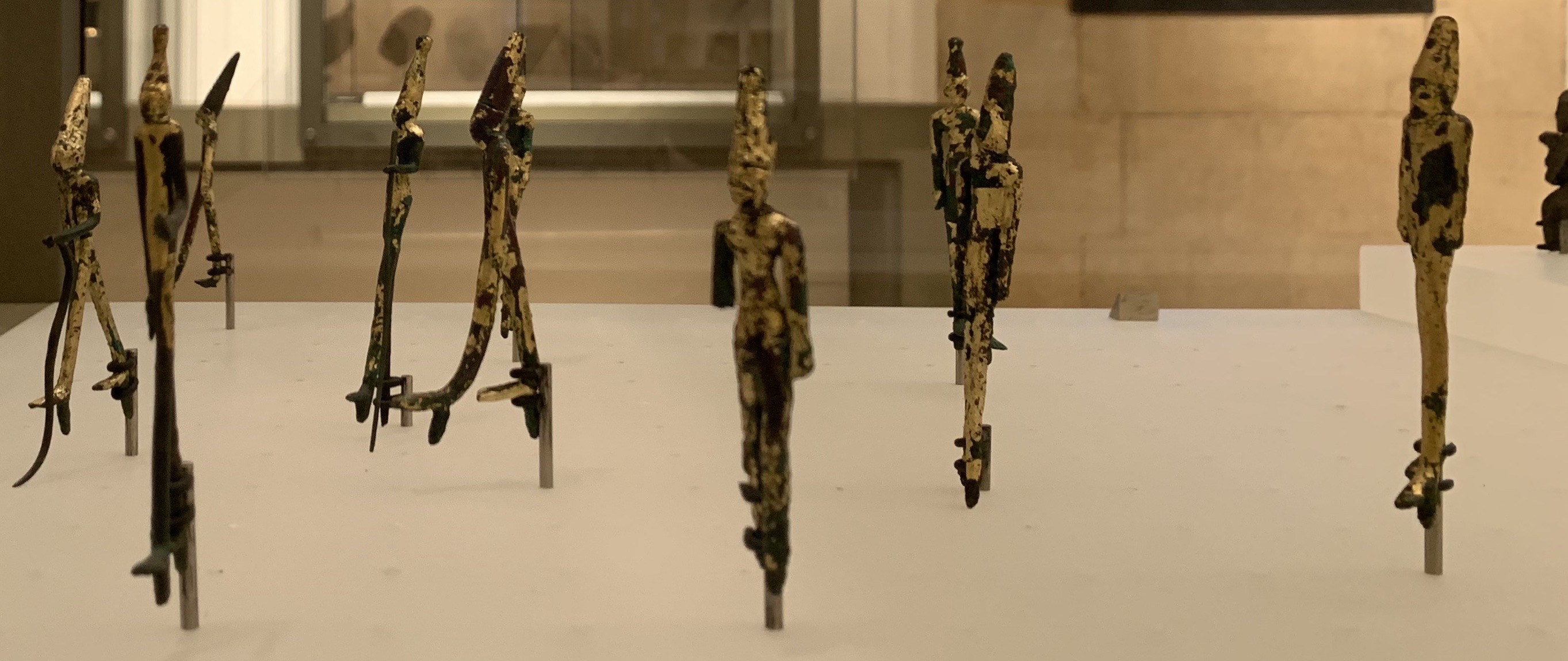
Figurine from the National Museum of Beirut

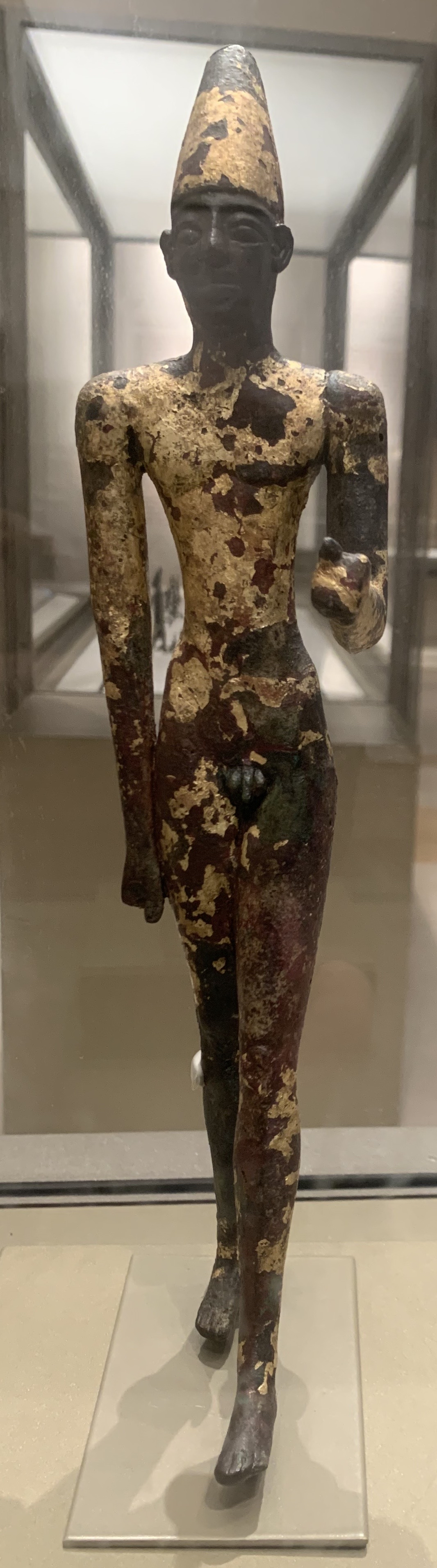
Figurine from the National Museum of Beirut

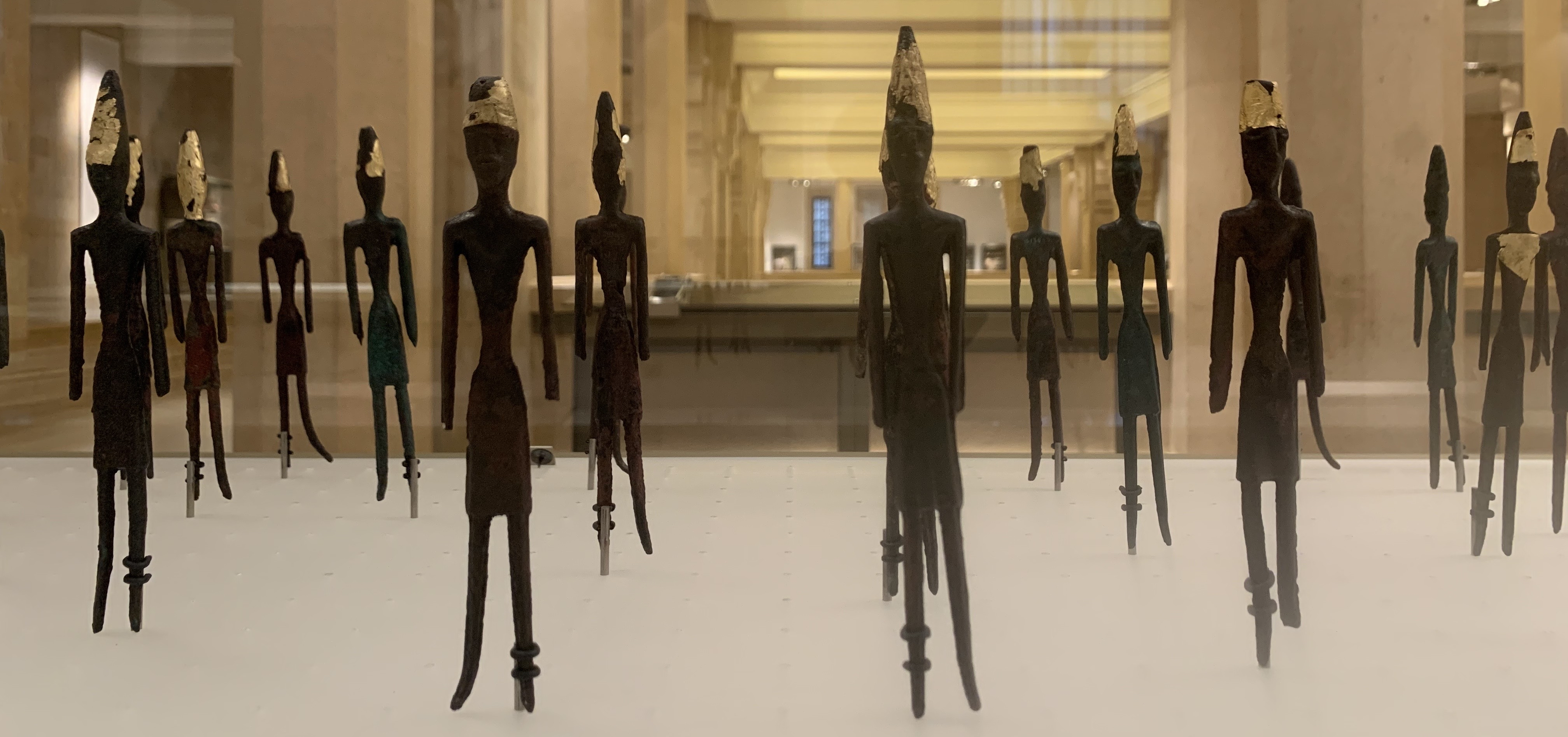
Figurine from the National Museum of Beirut

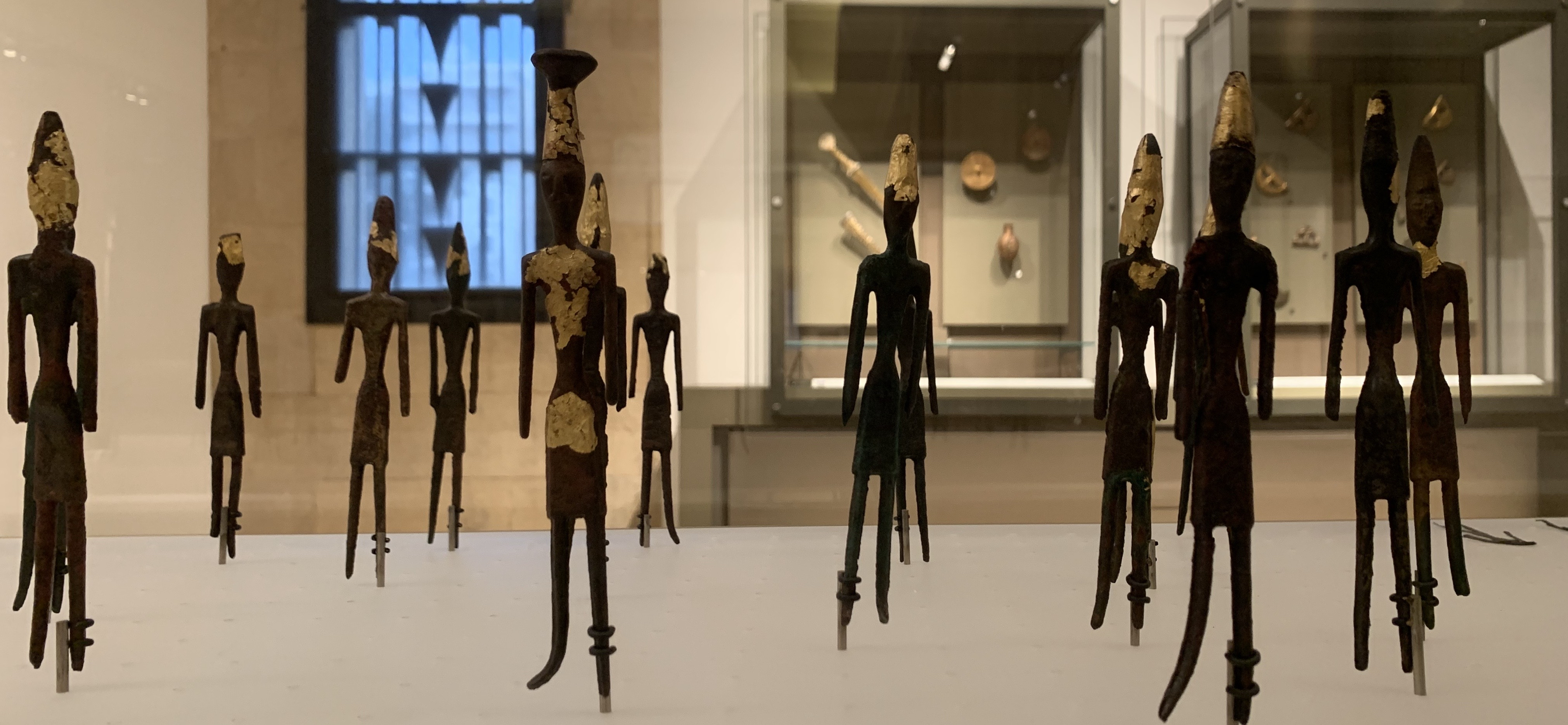
Figurine from the National Museum of Beirut

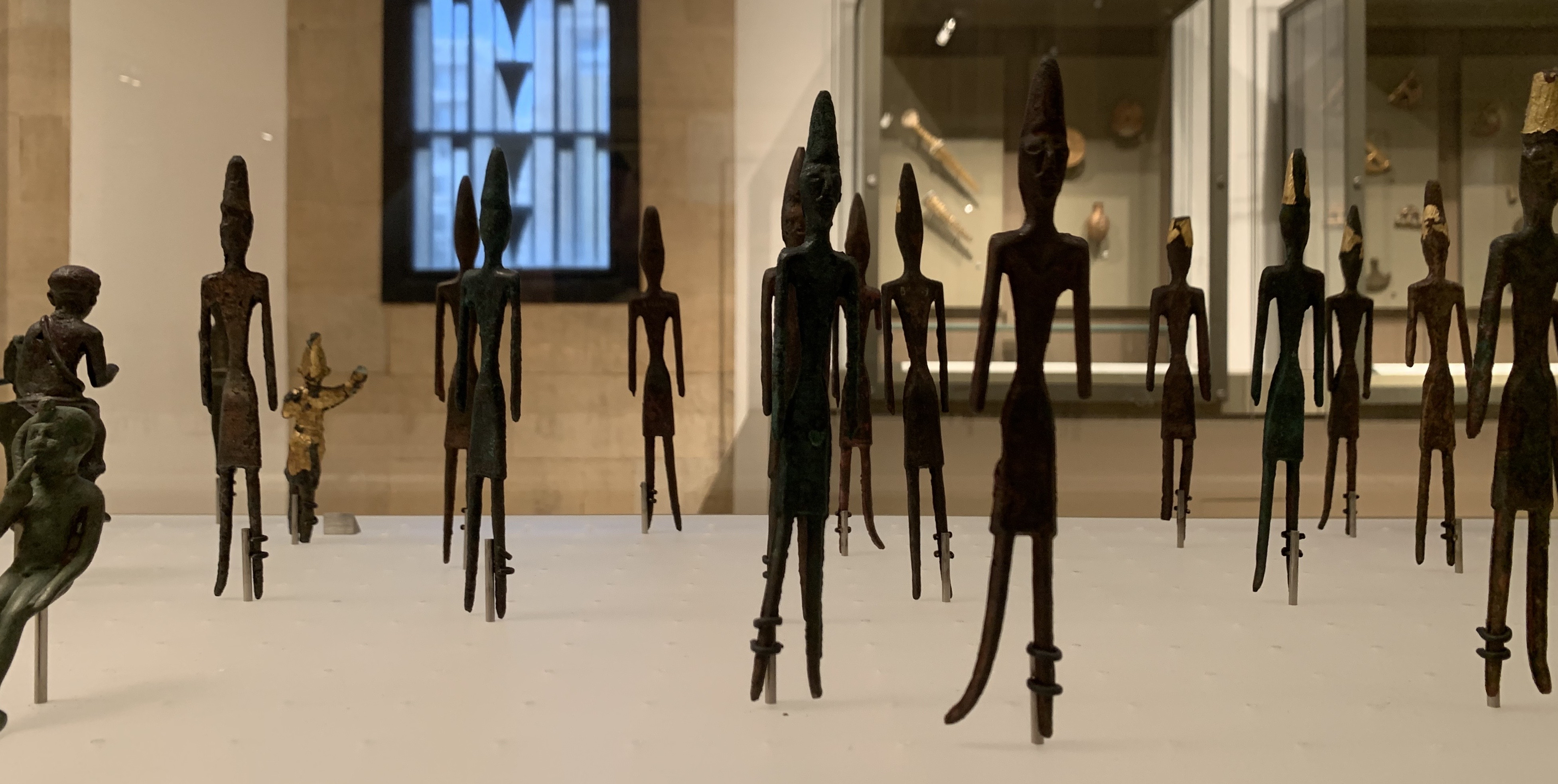
Figurine from the National Museum of Beirut

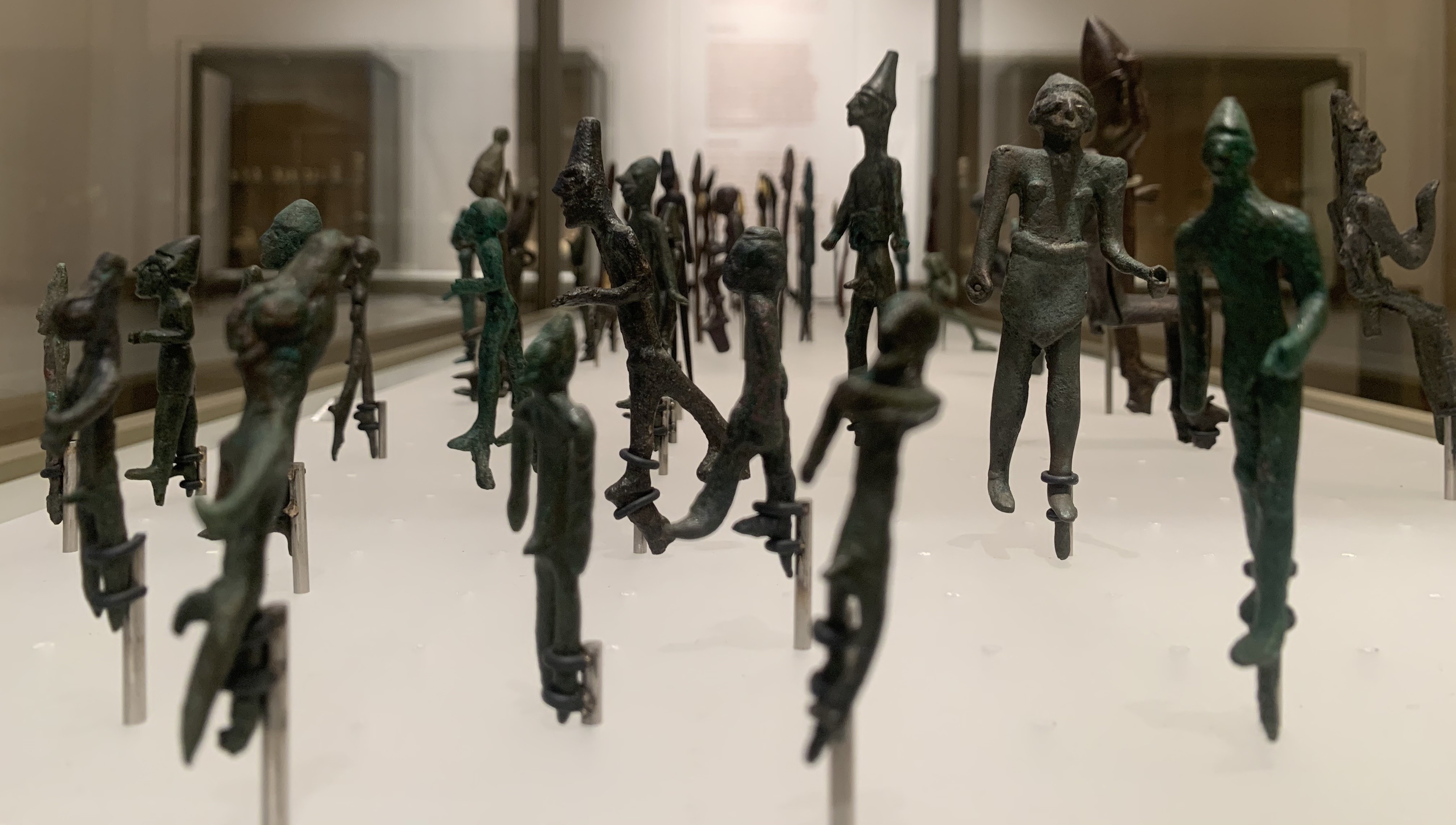
Figurine from the National Museum of Beirut - including an atypical, female figurine

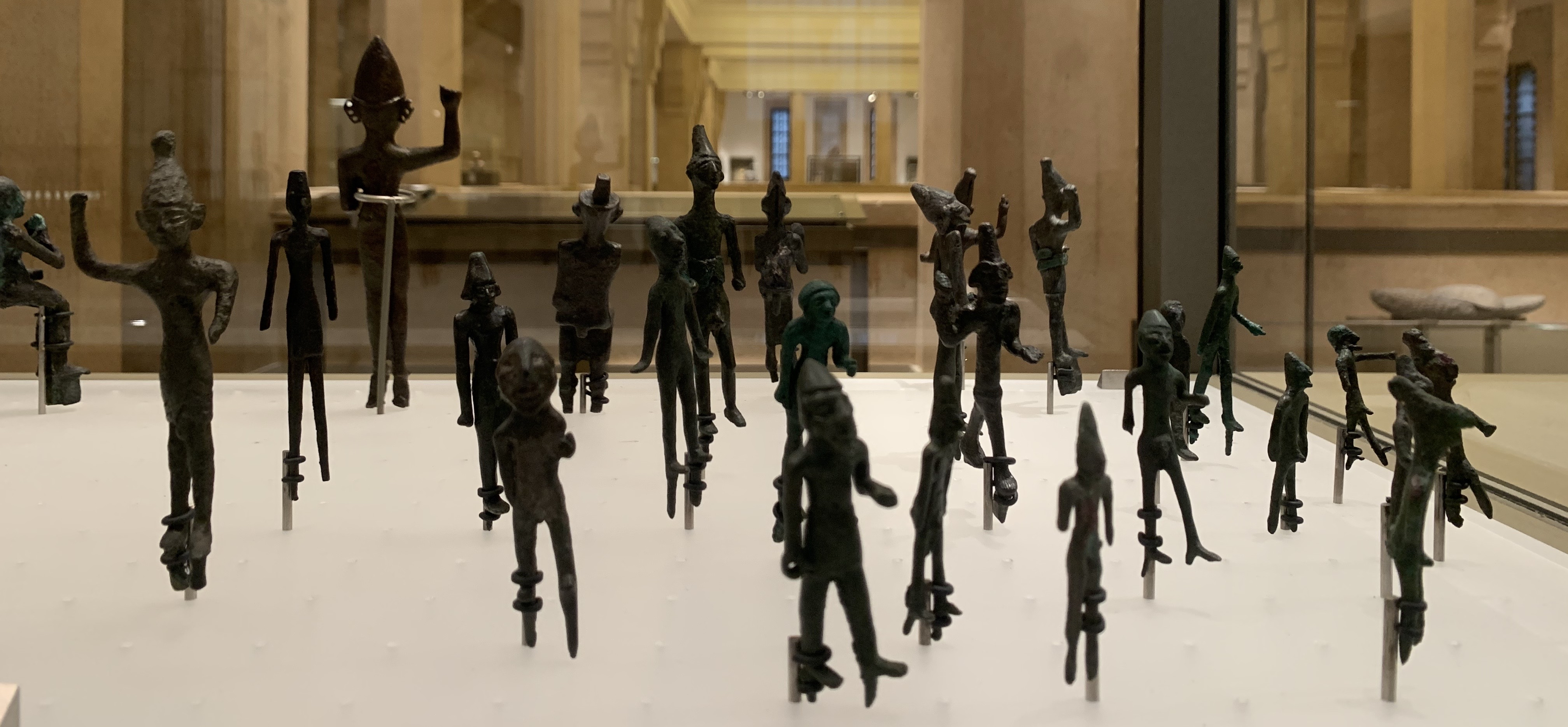
Figurine from the National Museum of Beirut

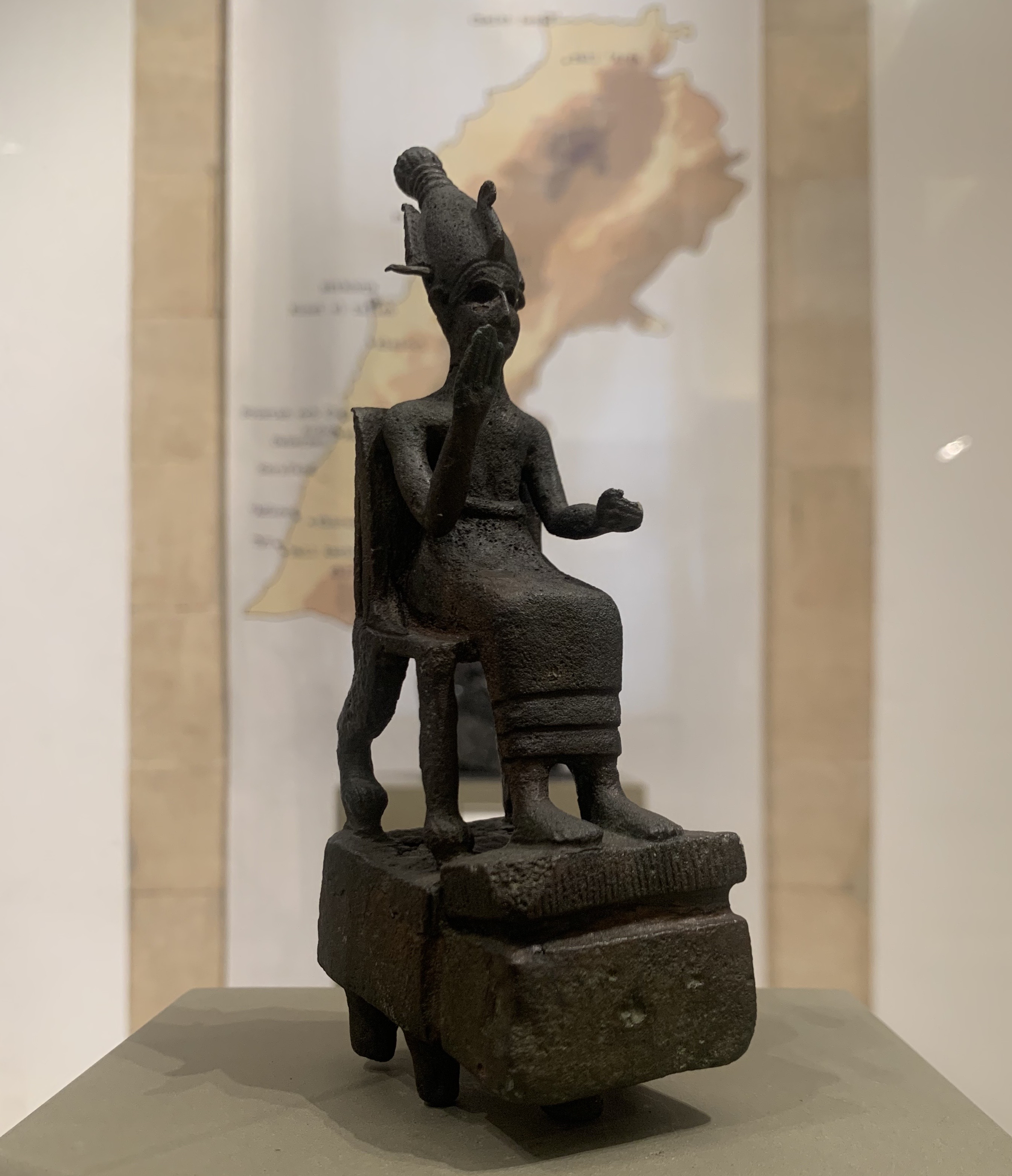
Figurine from the National Museum of Beirut

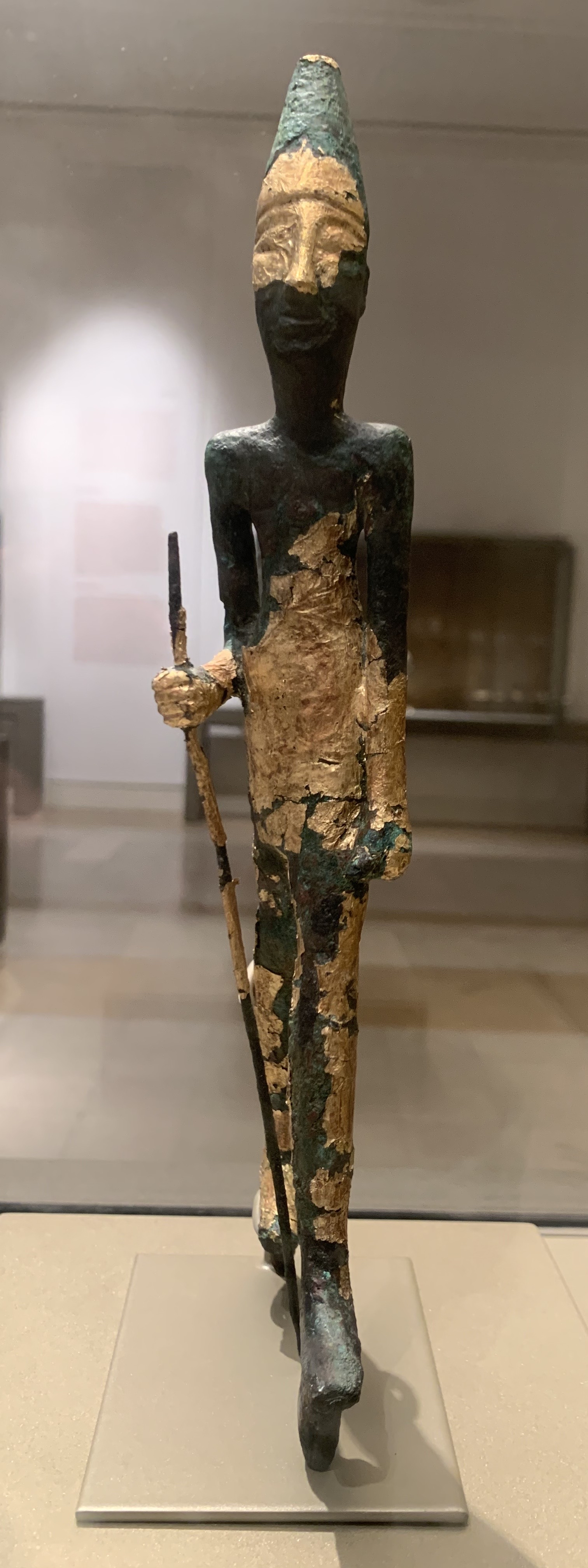
Figurine from the National Museum of Beirut

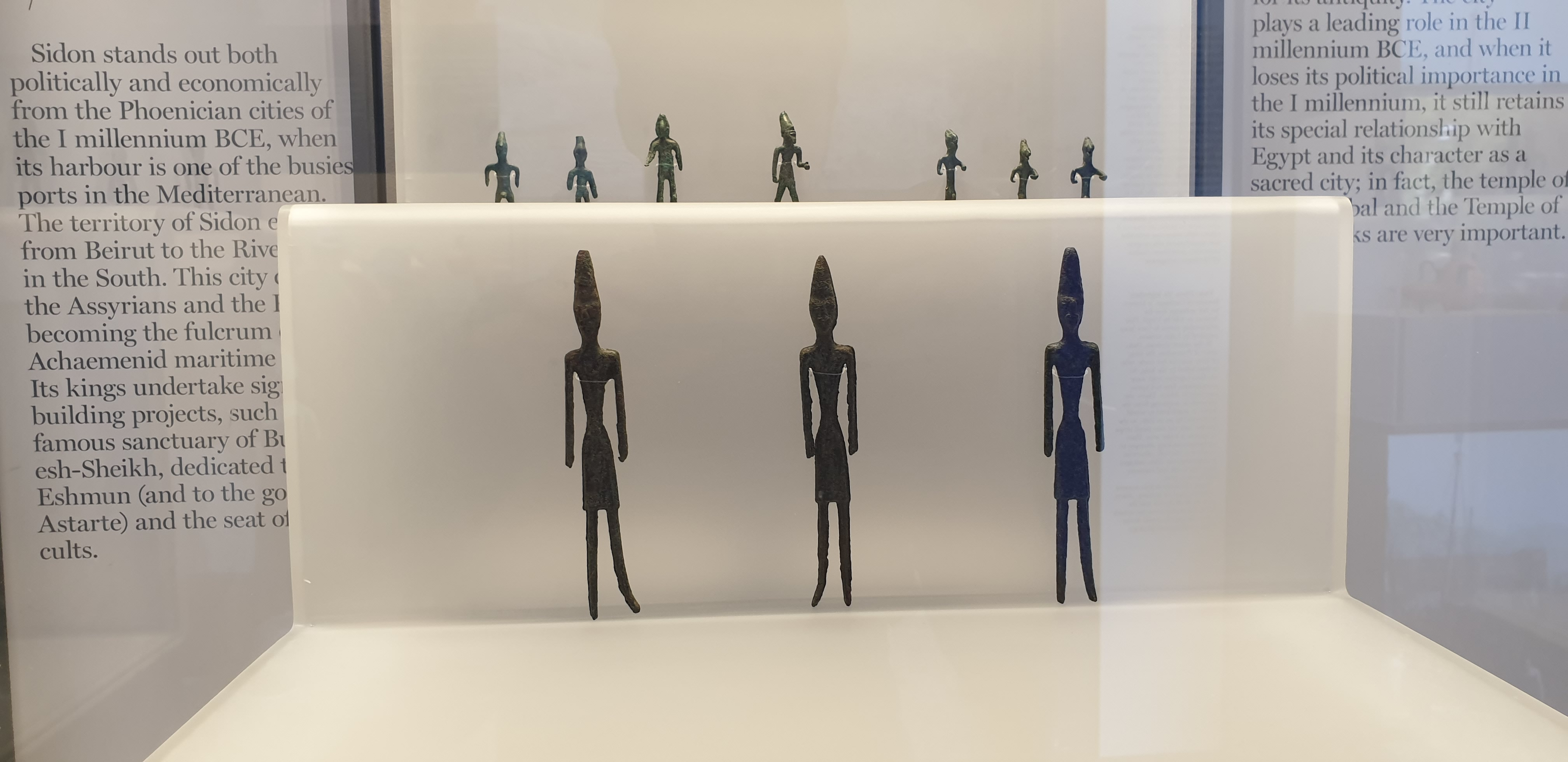
At an exhibition in Rome

=== Similar figurines found elsewhere ===
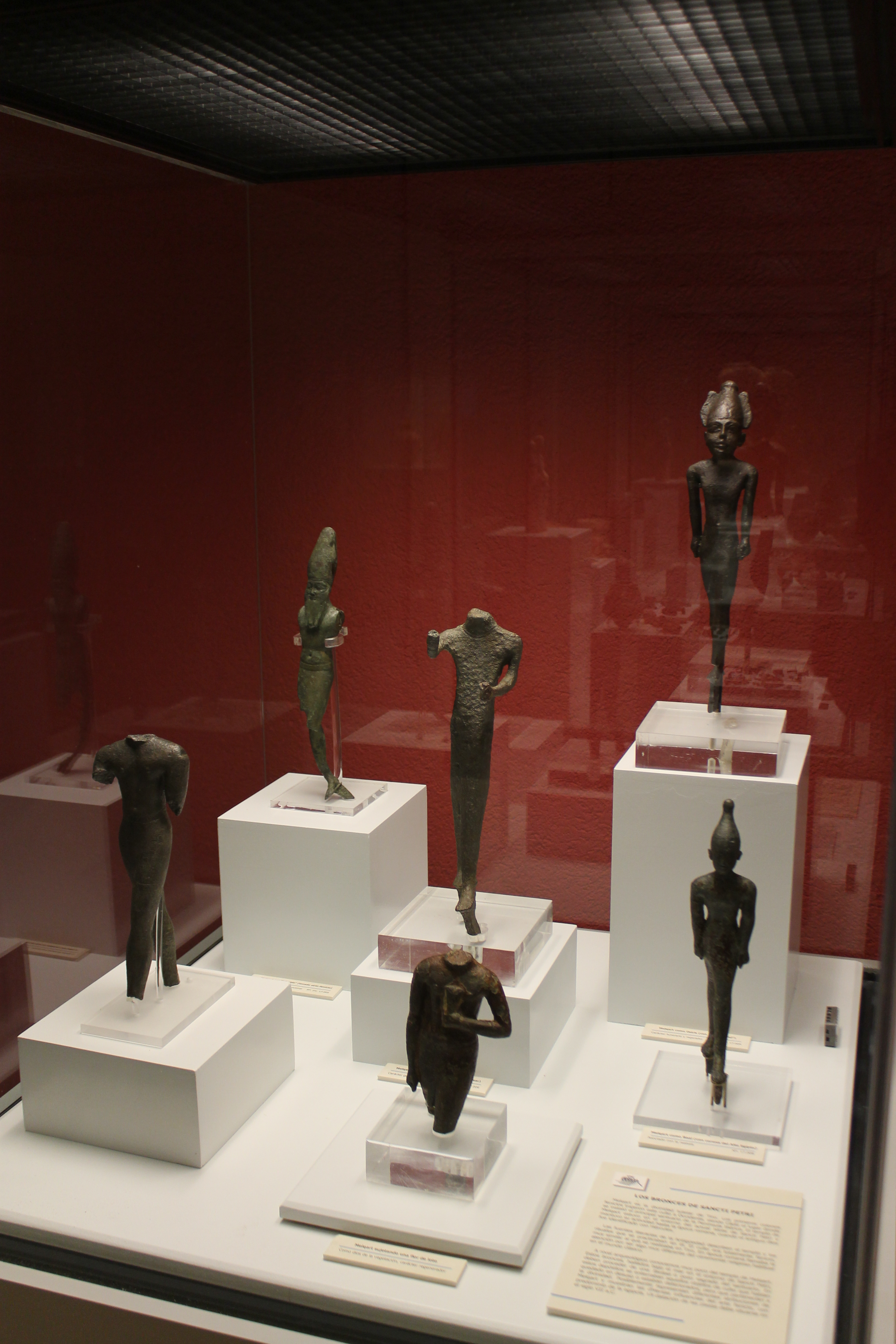
Figurines from Cádiz, Spain

== Bibliography ==
- Seeden, Helga (1980). "Group V-IX: The figurines from Byblos". The Standing Armed Figurines in the Levant. Vol. Prähistorische Bronzefunde, Abteilung I, Band I. Munich: C.H. Beck. pp. 36–101. ISBN 978-3-406-07801-9.
- Moorey, P. R. S.; Fleming, Stuart (1984). "Problems in the Study of the Anthropomorphic Metal Statuary from Syro-Palestine Before 330 B.c". Levant. 16. Levant, 16:1: 67–90. doi:10.1179/007589184790586283.
- Negbi, Ora (1976). Canaanite Gods in Metal: An Archaeological Study of Ancient Syro-Palestinian Figurines. Tel Aviv University, Institute of Archaeology.
- Briquel-Chatonnet, Françoise; Gubel, Éric (2007) [24 September 1998]. Les Phéniciens : Aux origines du Liban. Collection « Découvertes Gallimard » (nº 358) (in French). Paris: Éditions Gallimard. ISBN 978-2-07-053456-2.
- Negbi, Ora; Moskowitz, S (1966). "The 'Foundation Deposits' or 'Offering Deposits' of Byblos". Bulletin of the American Schools of Oriental Research (184): 21–26. doi:10.2307/1356202. JSTOR 1356202. S2CID 163236381.
- Philip, Graham (1988). "Hoards of the Early and Middle Bronze Ages in the Levant". World Archaeology. 20 (2): 190–208. doi:10.1080/00438243.1988.9980067. JSTOR 124470.
