= Egyptian obelisks =

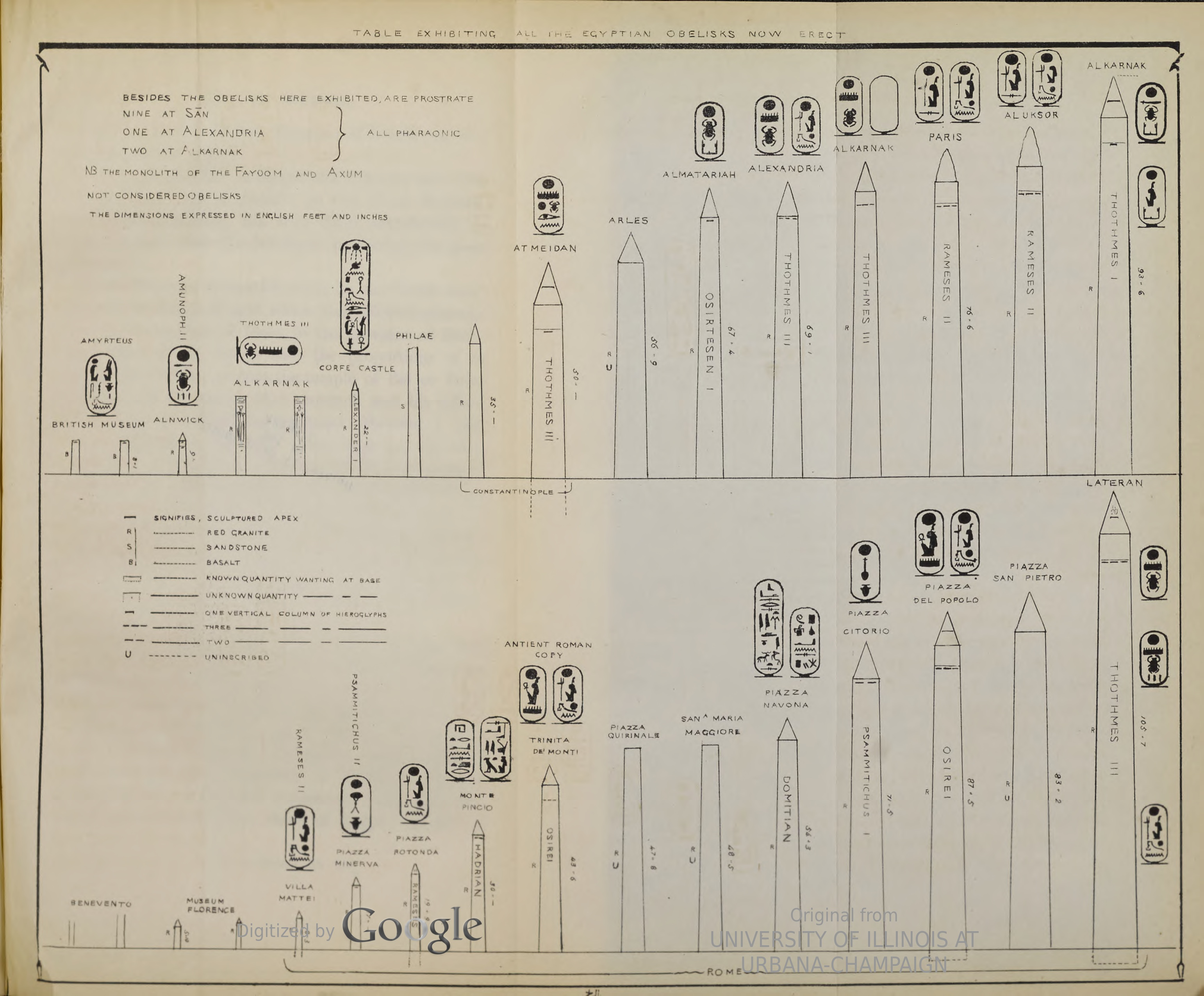
Bonomi (1843)

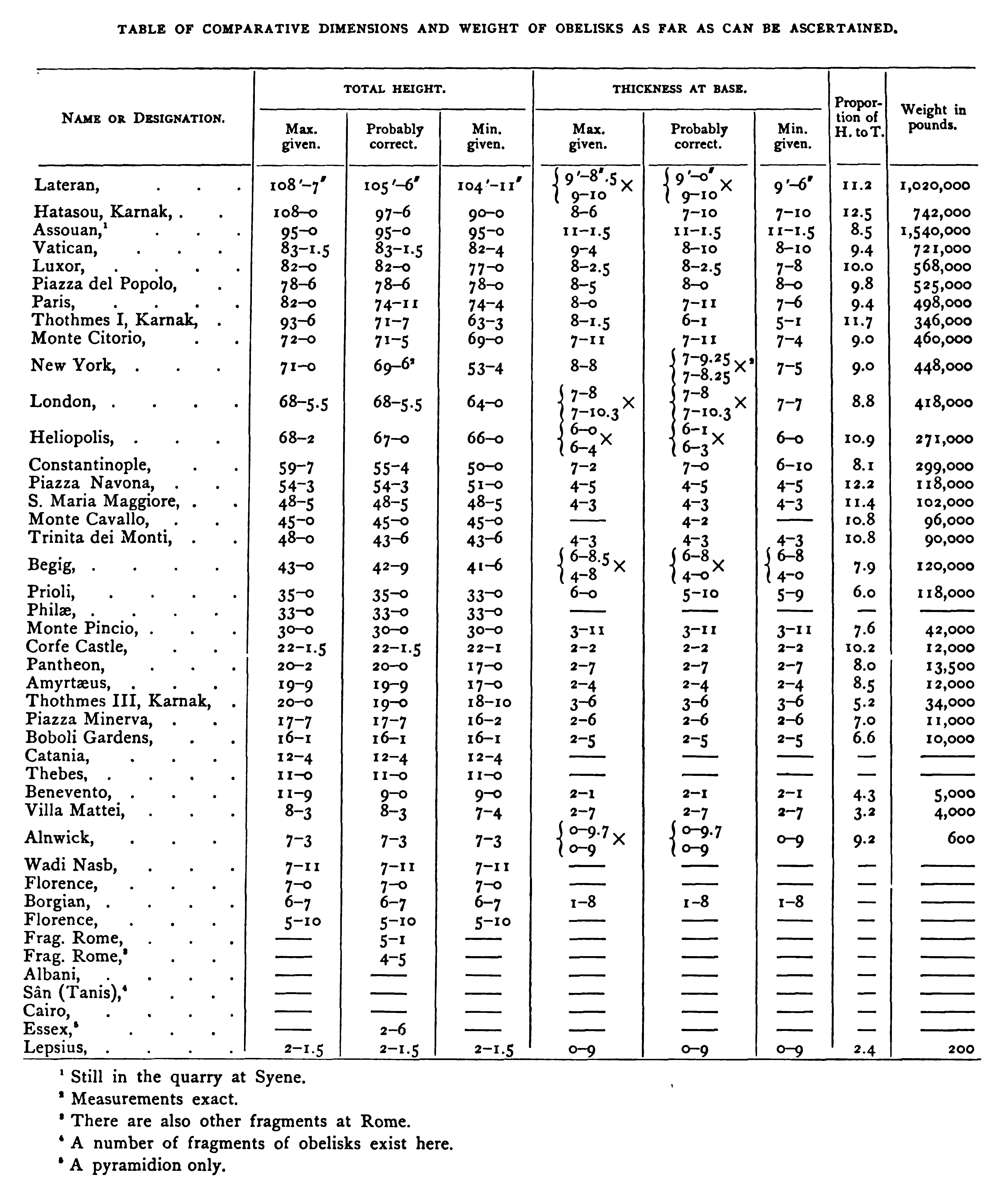
H.H. Gorringe (1882)

Lists of obelisks published during the 19th century

Obelisks had a prominent role in the architecture and religion of ancient Egypt.

Approximately 30 remaining ancient Egyptian obelisks are known, not including modern or pre-modern pseudo-Egyptian obelisks, such as the numerous Egyptian-style obelisks commissioned by Roman Emperors. The oldest of these extant obelisks date from the Middle Kingdom period, during the reign of Pharaoh Senusret I.

There are also approximately 40 known obelisk fragments, catalogued by Hiroyuki Nagase and Shoji Okamoto.

== Number ==
The location of the extant ancient Egyptian obelisks

Only about 30 such obelisks are still in existence worldwide; figures vary between sources with different definitions of extant Egyptian obelisks. For example, David Allen states there are 29 such obelisks, with more in Italy than in Egypt. Only two known obelisks date prior to the New Kingdom, both of which were dedicated to the Middle Kingdom Pharaoh Senusret I. At least 22 of the known obelisks date to the New Kingdom, four date to the Late Period and one to the Ptolemaic period.

The international transportation of Egyptian obelisks dates to the Roman conquest of Egypt following the death of Cleopatra, and in modern times as Egyptian "gifts" to other major cities such as the Luxor Obelisk at the Place de la Concorde in Paris, and the Cleopatra's Needles on the Victoria Embankment and in Central Park in London and New York City respectively. Only five obelisks still stand at the ruins of Ancient Egyptian temples.

The largest known obelisk, the unfinished obelisk, was never erected and was discovered in its original quarry. It is nearly one-third larger than the largest ancient Egyptian obelisk ever erected (the Lateran Obelisk in Rome); if finished it would have measured around 41.75 metres (137.0 ft) and would have weighed nearly 1,200 tonnes (2,600,000 lb).

The most recent ancient obelisk to be re-erected is the 17-metre-tall Ramses II obelisk in Tahrir Square, the main city square of Cairo, having been reassembled from eight blocks discovered at Tanis in the late 19th century. Dr Khaled El-Anany, Egyptian Minister of Tourism and Antiquities, said, "When we go to European capitals like Rome or Paris or London, and also Washington, we see that they use Egyptian obelisks in decorating their major tourist squares, so why do we not do the same?"

== List ==
Name	Image	Height (with base)	Pharaoh		Original location	Current location			Ref
Name	Image	Height (with base)	Name	Reign	Original location	Place (since)	City	Sovereign state	Ref
Unfinished obelisk	An obelisk	41.75 m	Hatshepsut	1479–1458 BC	Aswan (in situ)	Granite quarry, Aswan	Aswan	Egypt	
Lateran Obelisk	An obelisk	32.18 m (45.70 m with base)	Thutmose III / Thutmose IV	1479–1425 BC / 1401–1391 BC	Karnak	Lateran Palace	Rome	Italy	
Unfinished obelisk		32 m	Ptolemaic	305–30 BC	Akoris (in situ)	Limestone quarry, Akoris	Akoris	Egypt	
Karnak obelisks of Hatshepsut	An obelisk	29.56 m	Hatshepsut	1479–1458 BC	Karnak (in situ)	Karnak Temple	Luxor	Egypt	
Vatican obelisk (a.k.a. St Peter's Square obelisk or Caligula's obelisk)	An obelisk	25.5 m (41 m with base)	Unknown	Unknown	Alexandria	St. Peter's Square	Vatican City	Vatican City	
Luxor obelisks (Luxor and Paris obelisks)	An obelisk	25.03 m and 22.83 m	Ramesses II	1279–1213 BC	Luxor Temple	Luxor Temple (in situ)	Luxor	Egypt	
Luxor obelisks (Luxor and Paris obelisks)	An obelisk	25.03 m and 22.83 m	Ramesses II	1279–1213 BC	Luxor Temple	Place de la Concorde (1833)	Paris	France	
Flaminio Obelisk (a.k.a. Popolo obelisk)	An obelisk	24 m (36.5 m with base)	Seti I / Ramesses II	1294–1279 BC / 1279–1213 BC	Heliopolis	Piazza del Popolo	Rome	Italy	
Obelisk of Montecitorio (a.k.a. Solare obelisk)	An obelisk	21.79 m (33.97 m with base)	Psamtik II	595–589 BC	Heliopolis	Piazza di Montecitorio	Rome	Italy	
Karnak obelisk of Thutmosis I	An obelisk	21.20 m	Thutmose I	1506–1493 BC	Karnak (in situ)	Karnak	Luxor	Egypt	
Cleopatra's Needles (London and New York obelisks)	An obelisk	21.00 m	Thutmose III	1479–1425 BC	Heliopolis (via Alexandria)	Victoria Embankment (1878)	London	United Kingdom	
Cleopatra's Needles (London and New York obelisks)	An obelisk	21.00 m	Thutmose III	1479–1425 BC	Heliopolis (via Alexandria)	Central Park (1881)	New York City	United States	
Unfinished obelisk		21 m	Ptolemaic	305–30 BC	New Minya (in situ)	Limestone quarry, New Minya	Minya	Egypt	
Al-Masalla obelisk (a.k.a. Al Mataraiyyah obelisk)	An obelisk	20.40 m	Senusret I	1971–1926 BC	Heliopolis (in situ)	Al-Masalla area of Al-Matariyyah district in Heliopolis	Cairo	Egypt	
Obelisk of Theodosius (a.k.a. Istanbul obelisk)	An obelisk	18.54 m (25.6 m with base)	Thutmose III	1479–1425 BC	Karnak	Sultanahmet Square	Istanbul	Turkey	
Tahrir obelisk	An obelisk	17 m	Ramesses II	1279–1213 BC	Tanis	Tahrir Square (2020)	Cairo	Egypt	
Cairo Airport obelisk	An obelisk	16.97 m	Ramesses II	1279–1213 BC	Tanis	Cairo International Airport (1984)	Cairo	Egypt	
Hanging obelisk	An obelisk	15.5 m	Ramesses II	1279–1213 BC	Tanis	Grand Egyptian Museum	Giza	Egypt	
Pantheon obelisk (a.k.a. Macuteo or Rotonda obelisk)	An obelisk	14.52 m (26.34 m with base)	Ramesses II	1279–1213 BC	Heliopolis	Piazza della Rotonda	Rome	Italy	
Gezira obelisk	An obelisk	13.5 m (20.4 m with base)	Ramesses II	1279–1213 BC	Tanis	Gezira Island, Cairo	Cairo	Egypt	
Abgig obelisk (a.k.a. Crocodilopolis obelisk)	An obelisk	12.70 m	Senusret I	1971–1926 BC	Faiyum (local area, found fallen)	Abgig	Faiyum	Egypt	
Philae obelisk	An obelisk	6.70 m	Ptolemy IX	116–107 BC	Philae (Temple of Isis)	Kingston Lacy (1815)	Dorset	United Kingdom	
Boboli Obelisk	An obelisk	6.34 m	Ramesses II	1279–1213 BC	Heliopolis (via Rome)	Boboli Gardens (1790)	Florence	Italy	
Elephant and Obelisk (a.k.a. Minerveo obelisk)	An obelisk	5.47 m (12.69 m with base)	Apries	589–570 BC	Sais	Piazza della Minerva (Roman period, rediscovered 1665)	Rome	Italy	
Abu Simbel obelisks	An obelisk	3.13 m	Ramesses II	1279–1213 BC	Abu Simbel (Great Temple)	Nubian Museum	Aswan	Egypt	
Urbino obelisk (a.k.a. Albani obelisk)	An obelisk	3.00 m	Apries	589–570 BC	Sais (via Rome)	Ducal Palace	Urbino	Italy	
Poznań obelisk	An obelisk	3.00 m	Ramesses II	1279–1213 BC	Athribis (via Berlin, 1895)	Poznań Archaeological Museum (2002)	Poznań	Poland	
Matteiano obelisk (a.k.a. Celimontana obelisk)	An obelisk	2.68 m (12.23 m with base)	Ramesses II	1279–1213 BC	Heliopolis	Villa Celimontana	Rome	Italy	
Durham obelisk (a.k.a. Alnwick or Algernon obelisk)	An obelisk	2.15 m	Amenhotep II	1427–1401 BC	unknown (within the Thebaid)	Oriental Museum, University of Durham (1838)	Durham	United Kingdom	
Dogali obelisk (a.k.a. Casanatese obelisk)	An obelisk	2 m (6.34 m with base)	Ramesses II	1279–1213 BC	Heliopolis	Baths of Diocletian	Rome	Italy	
Abishemu obelisk	An obelisk	1.25 m (1.45 m with base)	Abishemu (King of Byblos)	1800s BC	Temple of the Obelisks	Beirut National Museum	Beirut	Lebanon	
Karnak obelisk of Seti II	An obelisk	0.95 m	Seti II	1203–1197 BC	Karnak (in situ)	Karnak	Luxor	Egypt	
Luxor obelisk	An obelisk	0.95 m (original est. 3 m)	Ramesses III	1186–1155 BC	Karnak	Luxor Museum (1923)	Luxor	Egypt	
Obelisks of Nectanebo II	An obelisk	0.95 m (original est. 5.5 m)	Nectanebo II	360–342 BC	Hermopolis	British Museum	London	United Kingdom	
Seti I obelisk tip		Unknown	Seti I	1294–1279 BC	Gebel Gulab quarries	Gebel Gulab quarries		Egypt	
