= Abishemu obelisk =

Ancient Egyptian obelisk

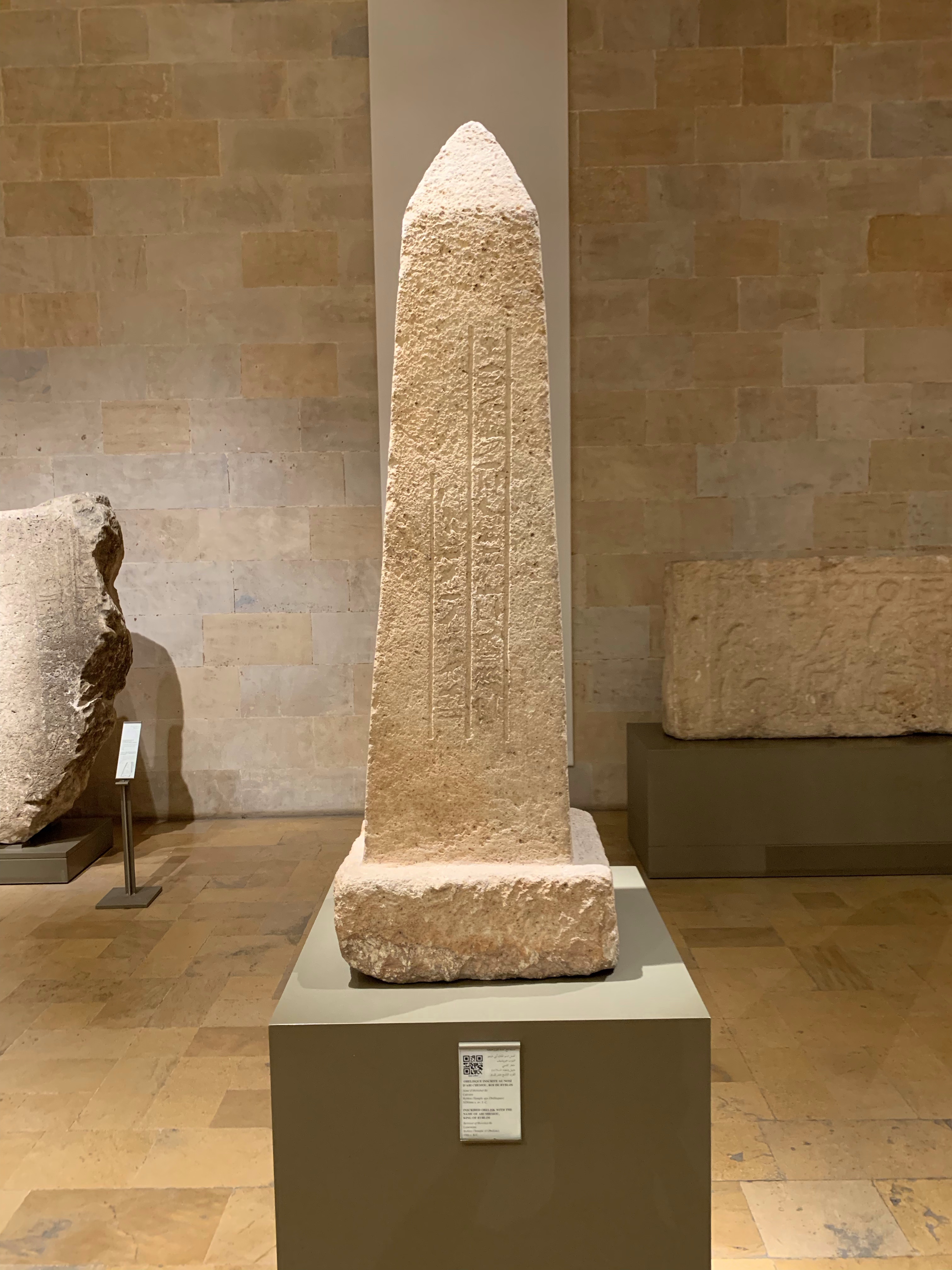
- The obelisk in its current location
- Material: Limestone
- Size: 1.45 meters (1.25 meters above the plinth)
- Writing: Egyptian hieroglyphs
- Created: c. 1800 BC
- Discovered: c. 1950
- Discovered by: Maurice Dunand
- Present location: National Museum of Beirut
- Identification: DGA 17917

The Abishemu obelisk or the Abichemou obelisk is a 1.25 meter limestone obelisk dedicated to the Phoenician king Abishemu I of Byblos. The obelisk is decorated with two lines of inscriptions in Egyptian hieroglyphics. It was created c. 1800 BCE, and was unearthed in the 1950s by Maurice Dunand in the Temple of the Obelisks. It is the world's third-oldest obelisk, and by far the oldest obelisk found outside Egypt.

Although only approximately a dozen words long, the obelisk contains:

- the name of one of the oldest known kings of Byblos, Abishemu I
- the earliest reference to the Lukka people, known from numerous later Egyptian and Hittite sources
- a reference to "Herishef", considered by Dunand to be the Egyptian name of the Canaanite god Resheph, and thus giving the alternate name "Temple of Resheph" for the Temple of the Obelisks

The obelisk is the only example of a complete obelisk with a true pyramidion found in the Temple of the Obelisks; most of the others were rough steles. It consists of a square plinth at the bottom, a tapering shaft and with a pyramidion at the top.

== Inscription ==
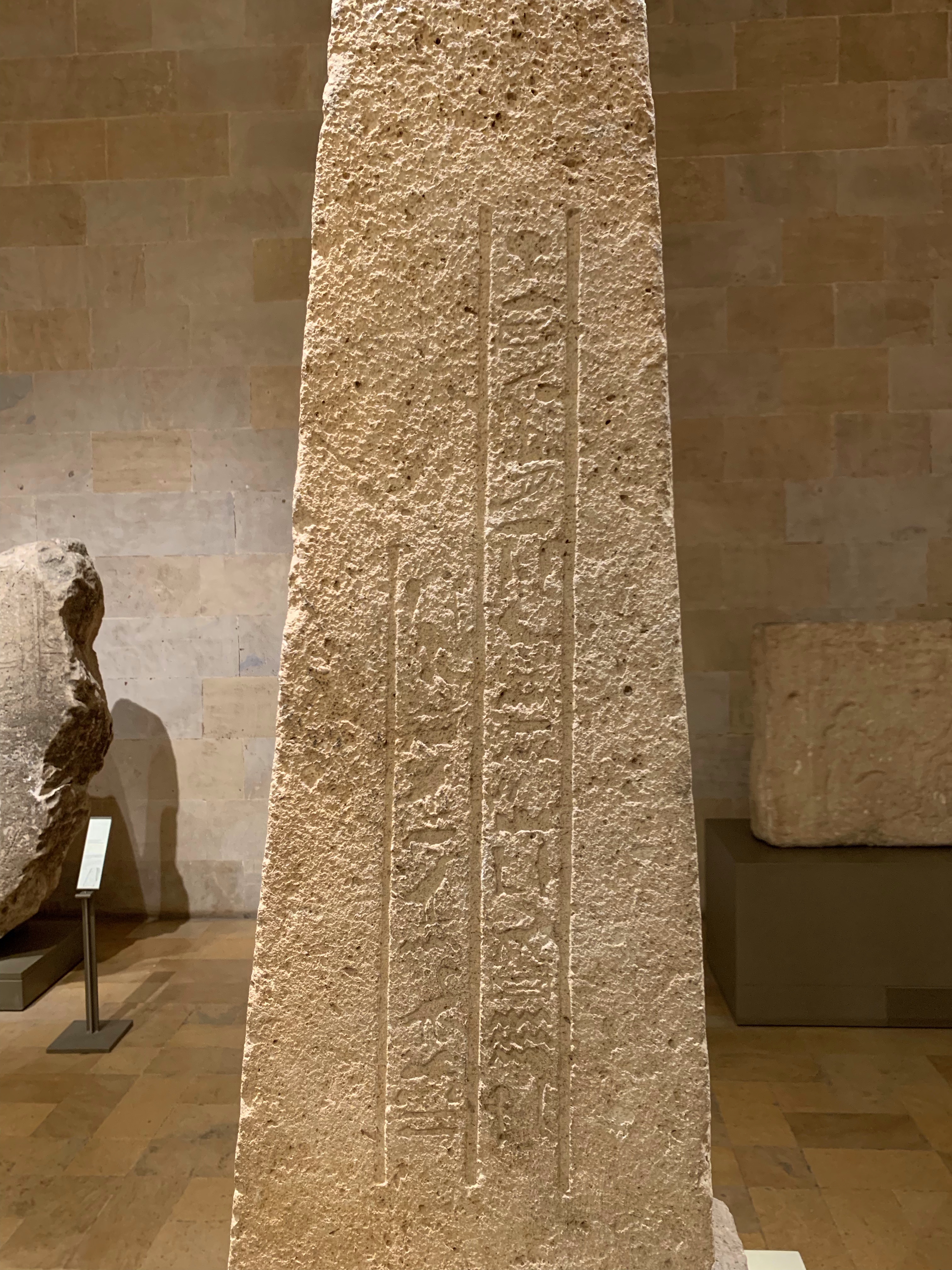
The inscription close up

Transcribed:

mry Ḥr-š·f ḥꜣty-ʻ n Kpny ʼb-šmw wḥm ʻnḫ

[...]f Kwkwn śꜣ Rwqq mꜣʻ ḫrw

Translated:

Beloved of Arsaphes [also translated Herishef], Abishemu, prince of Byblos, renewed in life, his
..., Kukun, son of 'the Lycian' justified (i. e., deceased).

== See also ==
- Kings of Byblos
- List of Egyptian obelisks
