= Abgig obelisk =

Ancient Egyptian monument near Faiyum

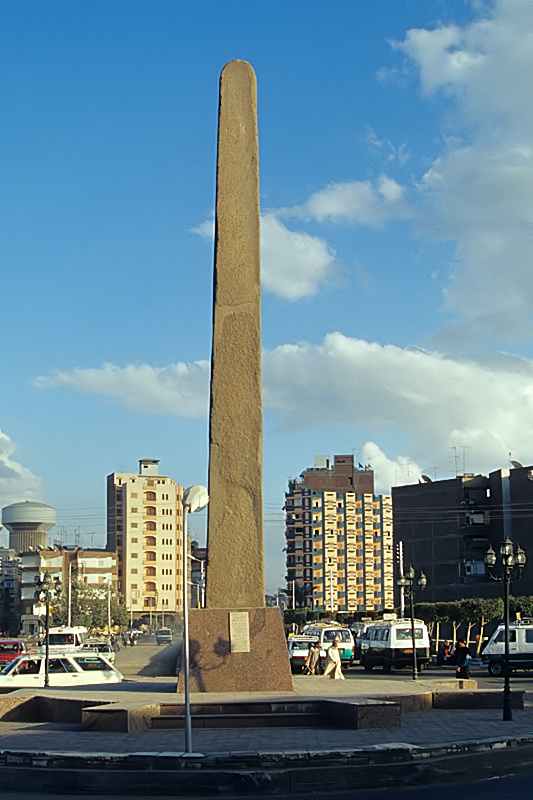
- The restored Abgig obelisk, as it currently stands near the entrance of Faiyum
- Interactive map of Abgig obelisk
- Location: Faiyum, Faiyum Governorate, Egypt
- Coordinates: 29°18′55″N 30°51′09.3″E
- Type: Obelisk
- Material: Granite
- Length: 3.6 m (12 ft)
- Height: 12.9 m (42 ft)
- Completion date: c. 1950 BC

The Abgig obelisk (also known as the Begig obelisk and the Faiyum obelisk) is an ancient stone monument erected by the Egyptian king Senusret I in the 20th century BC near what is now Faiyum. Made of red granite, it is likely that the obelisk once stood 12.9 metres (42.3 ft) high with a base of four limestone slabs. While the structure was still upright in the 17th century, by the early 19th, it had been toppled and split in two.

The obverse side of the obelisk features five detailed registers, each of which depicts two instances of Senusret I facing various Egyptian gods; the obverse side once also featured a now-lost hieroglyphic inscription. While the Egyptian government restored the obelisk in 1972 and placed it near the entrance of modern-day Faiyum, centuries of neglect and exposure have badly eroded the monument.

== History ==
The Abgig obelisk was erected in the 20th century BC by king Senusret I (second king of the 12th Dynasty of ancient Egypt), roughly 3 kilometres (1.9 mi) southwest of present-day Faiyum. Archaeological reports from the early 20th century confirm that the toppled remnants of the monument were not located near any other major structures, and both Marco Zecchi and Roland Enmarch note that there is little if any evidence that the obelisk was originally erected elsewhere before being relocated to Faiyum. To account for its otherwise isolated location, scholars such as Enmarch, Sydney Aufrère, and Jean-Claude Golvin have suggested that the monument was likely once part of a larger religious complex that was lost at some point in antiquity.

The earliest post-antiquity mentions of the obelisk were made in 1672 by Johann Vansleb, and by Richard Pococke in the mid-18th century; the latter, in his work Description of the East, described the structure as "a very particular obelisk of a red granite" that was "much decay'd all round for ten feet high, but mostly on the south side; the west side is almost entirely defaced, and at the south west and south east corners, it is much broken for about twenty feet high". Pococke's description suggests that the obelisk was still standing in the 17th century, but by the time the French engineer Philippe Joseph Marie Caristie visited the monument near the turn of the 19th century, it been "knocked down on the ground [and] broke[n] into two pieces".

In the following years, the obelisk was visited and described by Edward Lane (1827), John Wilkinson (1827), and Karl Lepsius. In 1925, Mohamed E. Chaaban excavated the area around the fallen obelisk and discovered its base. Chaaban also unsuccessfully searched for the figure that may have once rested on the top of the monument. In 1972, the obelisk was restored by Egyptian authorities and moved to Medinet el-Fayyum. However, due to centuries of neglect and exposure to the elements, hardly anything remains of the monument's inscriptions or its registers. For this reason, Lepsius's detailed drawings of the monument are considered "of permanent value for its study".

Drawings of the Abgig obelisk

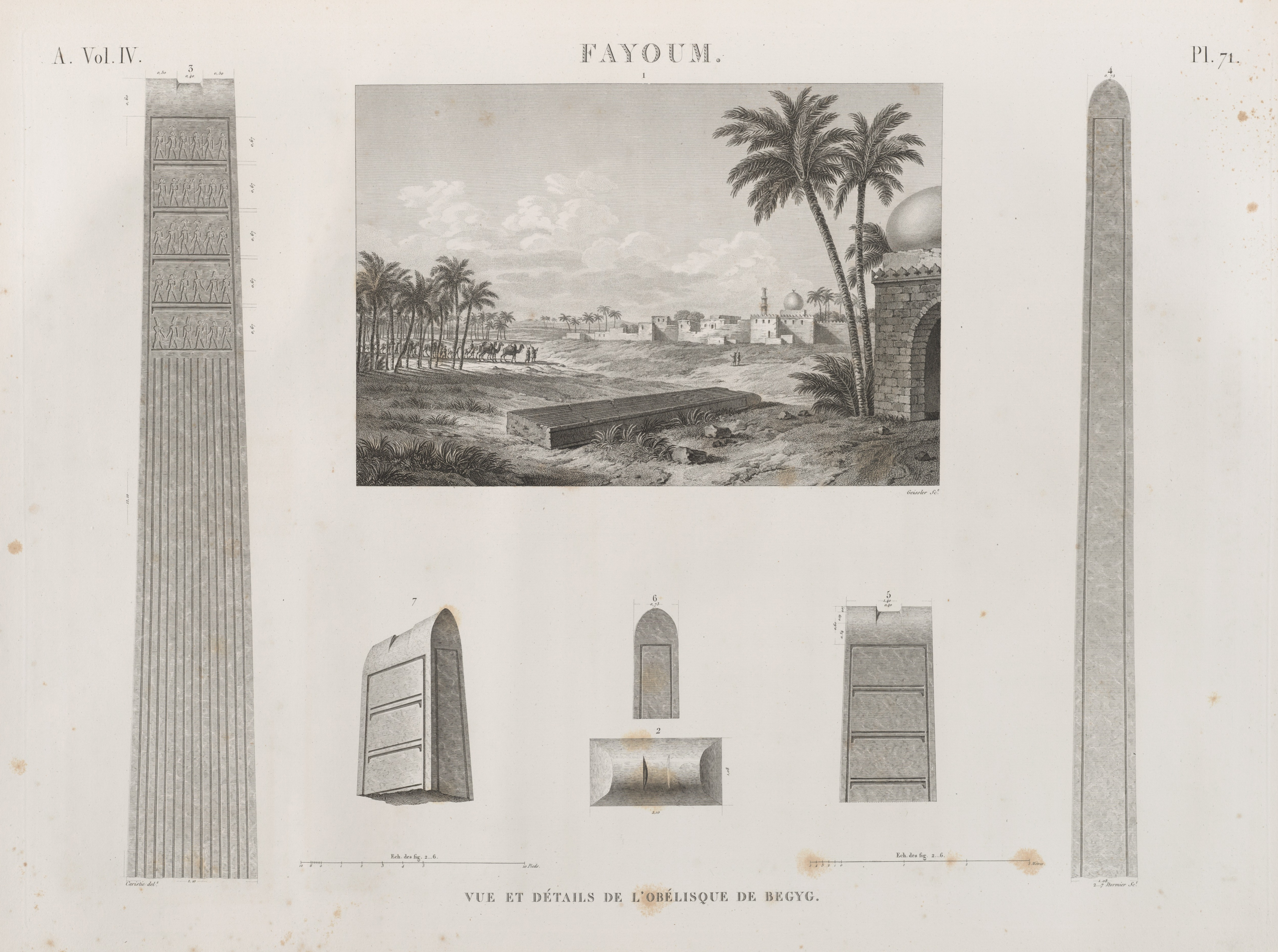
An 1817 lithograph of the Abgig obelisk, depicting the various sides of the structure

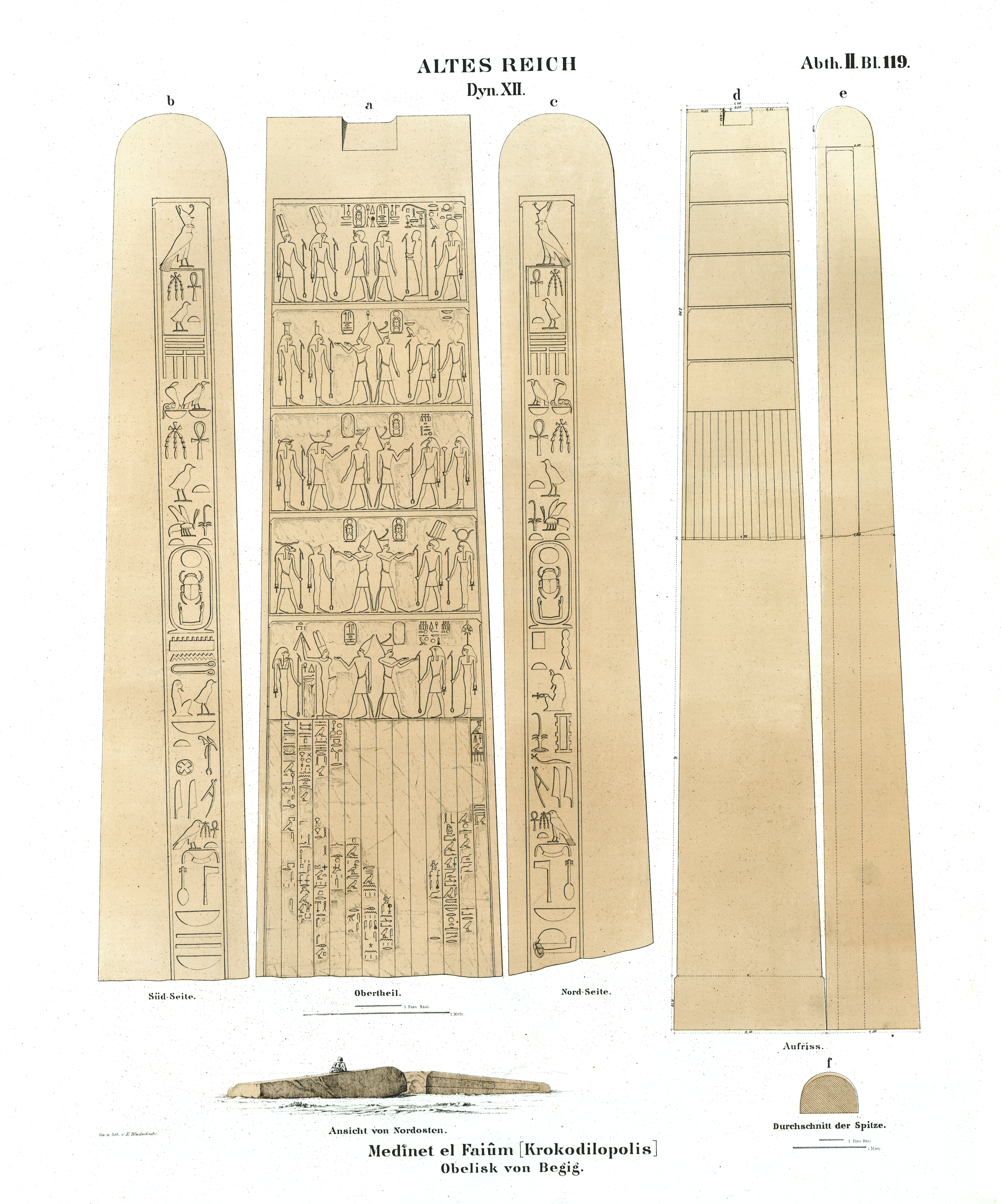
Karl Richard Lepsius's 1849 lithograph of the Abgig obelisk

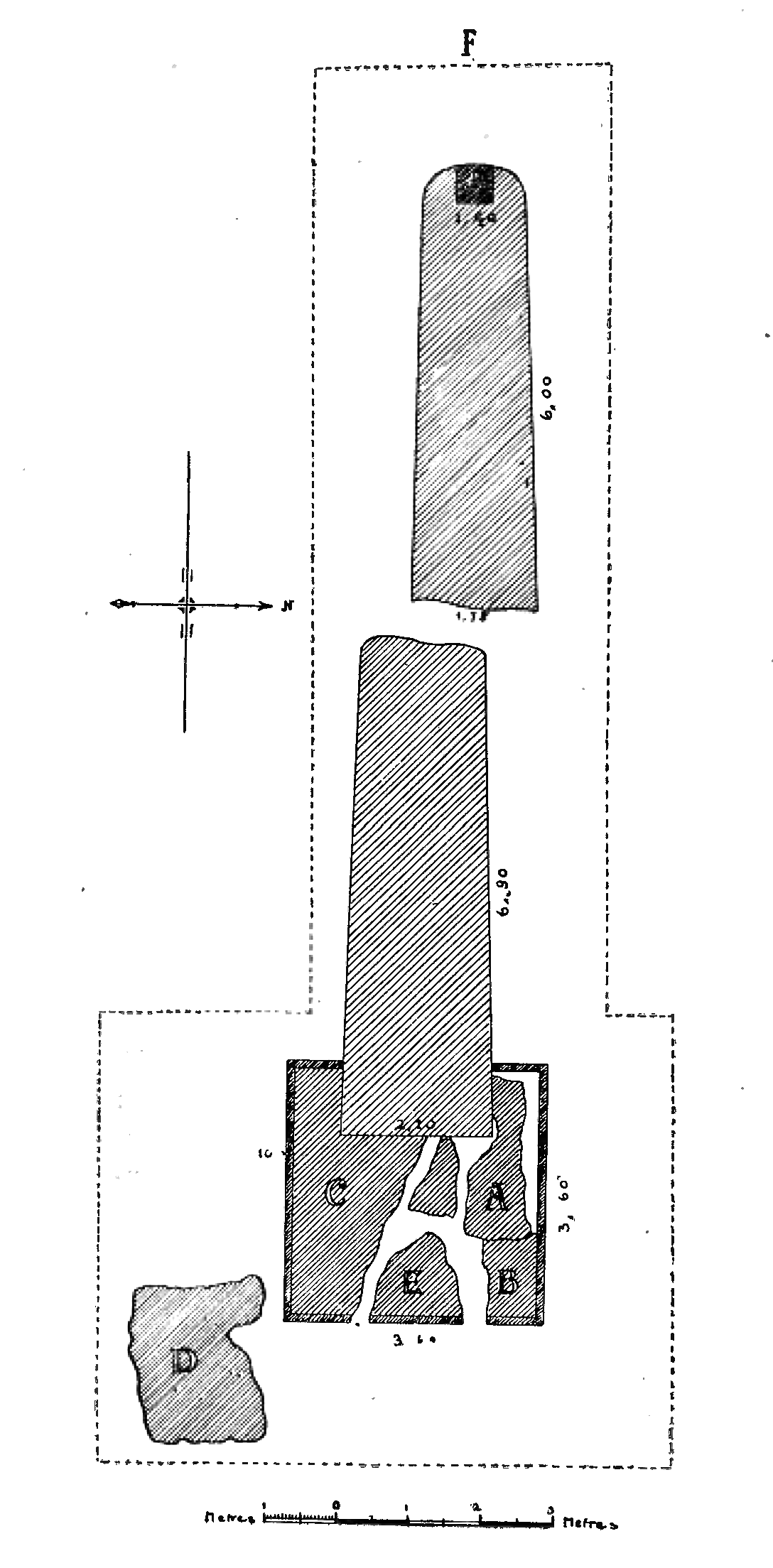
Top-down survey by Mohamed E. Chaaban (1927)

== Description ==
The obelisk of Abgig is made of red granite and when first erected, it likely stood 12.9 m (42.3 ft) high, with a base (composed of four limestone slabs) that measured 3.6 m (12 ft) by 3.6 metres. The obelisk tapers upwards and has a rounded top. There is a recess in the middle of the obelisk's crest, which may have once housed a sculpted figure. Gaston Maspero and Hourig Sourouzian have both argued that this figure was probably a falcon made of metal, although Marco Zecch argues that this suggestion is speculative at best.

=== Obverse side ===
The obverse (north) side of the obelisk features five detailed registers, each of which depicts two instances of the pharaoh Senusret I (identified in several places as "Kheper-ka-ra" [ḫpr-kꜣ-rꜥ], which means the "Manifestation of the Ka of Ra") standing back-to-back; each instance of the pharaoh, in turn, is facing a unique pair of gods. As Lisa Saladino Haney notes, these deities are not identified on the obelisk with "Fayumic epithets", suggesting that the monument's purpose was to establish "dynastic presence in a provincial region" rather than syncretize local religious beliefs. A description of the registers (arranged from top to the bottom) is as follows:

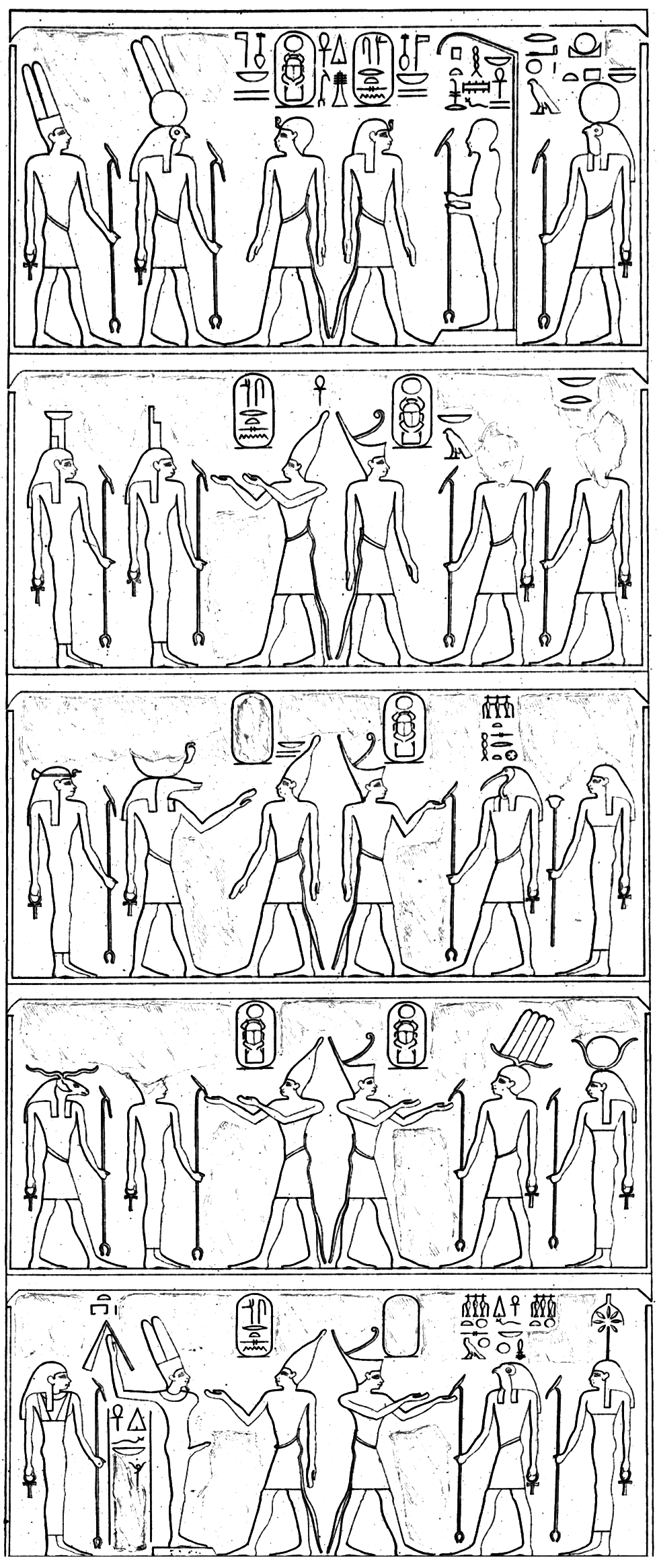
The five registers on the obverse face of the Abgig Obelisk, as depicted by Karl Richard Lepsius in his 1849 book Denkmäler aus Ägypten und Äthiopien

Description of the Abgig obelisk's obverse registers
Reg.	Left-hand side	Right-hand side	Ref.
1	Senusret I, wearing a headscarf, faces Amun (left) and Montu (right).	Senusret I, wearing a headscarf, faces Ptah (left) and Ra-Horakhty (right).	
2	The king, wearing the white crown, presents an offering to Nephthys (left) and Isis (right).	The king, wearing the red crown, faces two male deities (possibly Horus and Set)	
3	The king, wearing the white crown, faces Renenutet (left) and Sobek (right).	The king, wearing the red crown, faces Thoth (left) and an unknown goddess (right).	
4	The king, wearing the white crown, presents an offering, likely to Khnum (left) and either Neith or Satet (right).	The king, wearing the red crown, presents an offering to Anhur (left) and Hathor (right).	
5	The king, wearing the white crown, invokes an unknown goddess (left) and Min (right).	The king, wearing the red crown, presents an offering to the falcon-headed god "foremost of Khem" (left) and to Seshat (right).	

Below the fifth register, there once existed 14 columns of hieroglyphs. By the 19th century, this text had been badly eroded, and Lepsius was able to copy only parts of the inscription. Today, none of this inscription remains. Because the text copied by Lepsius is so fragmentary, determining what the inscription once said is likely impossible. That said, Zecchi postulates that the columns may have recorded a speech that Senusret I delivered to his court concerning the construction of new monuments. Zecchi bases his hypothesis on the fact that similar inscriptions have been identified on a variety of objects that were constructed during Senusret I's reign. Roland Enmarch has likewise suggested that the text is an example of a königsnovelle (i.e., "a specific literary form describing a unique event in the life of the king-a single, simple, great deed").

=== Eastern and western sides ===
On the eastern side of the monument is a hieroglyphic inscription that reads: "Horus Ankh-mesut, Two Ladies Ankh-mesut, king of Upper and Lower Egypt Kheper-ka-ra, beloved of Montu, lord of Thebes [...]". On the western side, there is a similar inscription that reads: "Horus Ankh-mesut, Two Ladies Ankh-mesut, king of Upper Egypt Kheper-ka-ra, beloved of Ptah south of his wall [...]".

=== Reverse side ===
Unlike the obverse side, the monument's reverse (south) side has not been as thoroughly documented. This face of the monument features a register in which two depictions of the king are shown standing back-to-back. While the figure on the left has been eroded considerably, the one on the right has largely been preserved. In the preserved portion, the king—explicitly identified as "the good god Senusret" (nṯr-nfr Snwsrt)—is shown wearing the white crown and offering vases to Atum and another unknown god.

== See also ==
- List of Egyptian obelisks
