= Abishemu of Byblos =

Ruler of Byblos (c. 1750–1700 BCE)

Abishemu
- King/Governor of Byblos
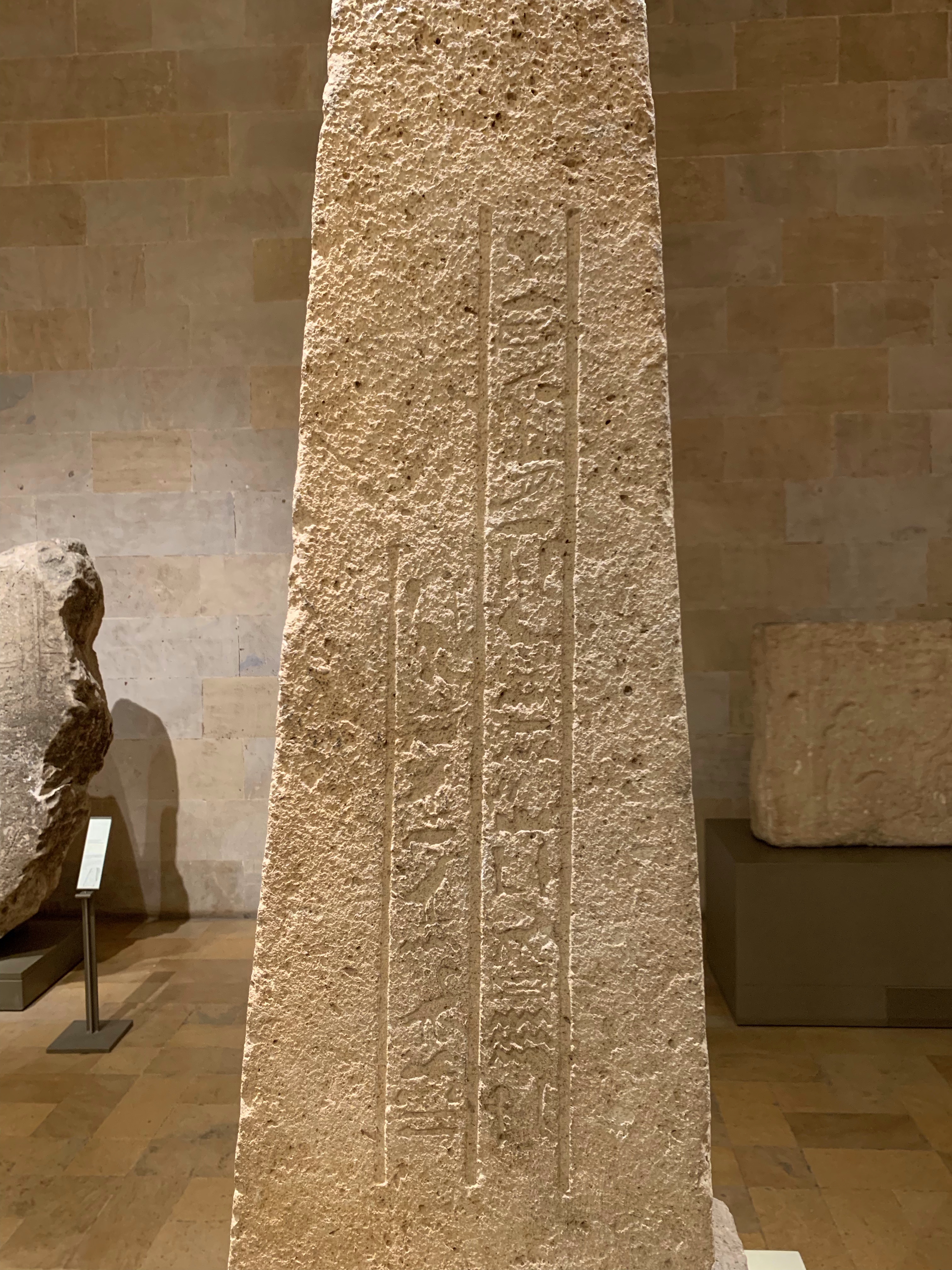
- The Abishemu obelisk

King of Byblos (Egyptian: Haty-aa of Kepny)
- Reign: c. 1750-1700 BC
- Predecessor: Kukun
- Successor: Ibshemuabi
- Born: c. 1750-1700 BCE; Byblos
- Died: c. 1750-1700 BCE; Byblos
- Burial: Byblos
- Issue: Ibshemuabi
- Father: Kukun?

Abishemu of Byblos (Ib-shemu; ʼb-šmw) was the ruler of the city-state of Byblos during the late Middle Bronze IIA (c. 1820–1628 BC). In relation to Syria, the ruler of Byblos held the title "king" in the Mari Archive. However, Abishemu belongs to a sequence of rulers who held the Egyptian title Haty-aa of Kepny (ḥꜣty-ʻ n Kpny), indicating they served as "governors" for the great king of Egypt during the late 12th Dynasty and early 13th Dynasty.

== Reign ==
Abishemu (also known as Abichemou) may have been the son of Kukun, son of Ruqqa/Luqqa (the R and L are interchangeable), and father of Ibshemuabi. His reign may correspond to the second half of the Middle Bronze II, when Byblos may have recognized the Great King of Egypt as its overlord, using the title Haty-aa and adopting Egyptian style as opposed to the Syrian style dominated by Yamhad and Qatna.

== Attestations ==
Abishemu is mainly known from the Abishemu obelisk found in the Temple of Obelisks.

Transcribed: mry Ḥr-š·f ḥꜣty-ʻ n Kpny ʼb-šmw wḥm ʻnḫ [...]f Kwkwn śꜣ Rwqq mꜣʻ ḫrw

Translated: Beloved of Herishef, Haty-aa of Byblos (Governor), Ib-shemu, repeating life, his [father], Kukun, son of Ruqqa/Luqqa, justified (deceased).

Wehem ankh (wHm ʻnḫ) literally means "repeating life", an expression used in Ancient Egypt in various contexts, also as an epithet applied to the deceased from the Middle Kingdom onwards. Thus, the obelisk may be associated with the burial of Abishemu.

== Theories ==
Some have speculated that "Kwkwn śꜣ Rwqq" in the Abishemu Obelisk may refer to Kukunnis, son of Lukka, Lukka being an ethnic group later considered to be among the purported "Sea Peoples", transliterated as Kukunnis, son of Lukka" (in analysis of the Sea Peoples, Lukka have been proposed as "Lycians").

== See also ==
- Kings of Byblos

== Bibliography ==
- Albright, William F. (1959). "Dunand's New Byblos Volume: A Lycian at the Byblian Court". Bulletin of the American Schools of Oriental Research. 155 (155): 31–34. doi:10.2307/1355673. JSTOR 1355673. S2CID 163957543.
