= Temple of the Obelisks =

Temple in Byblos

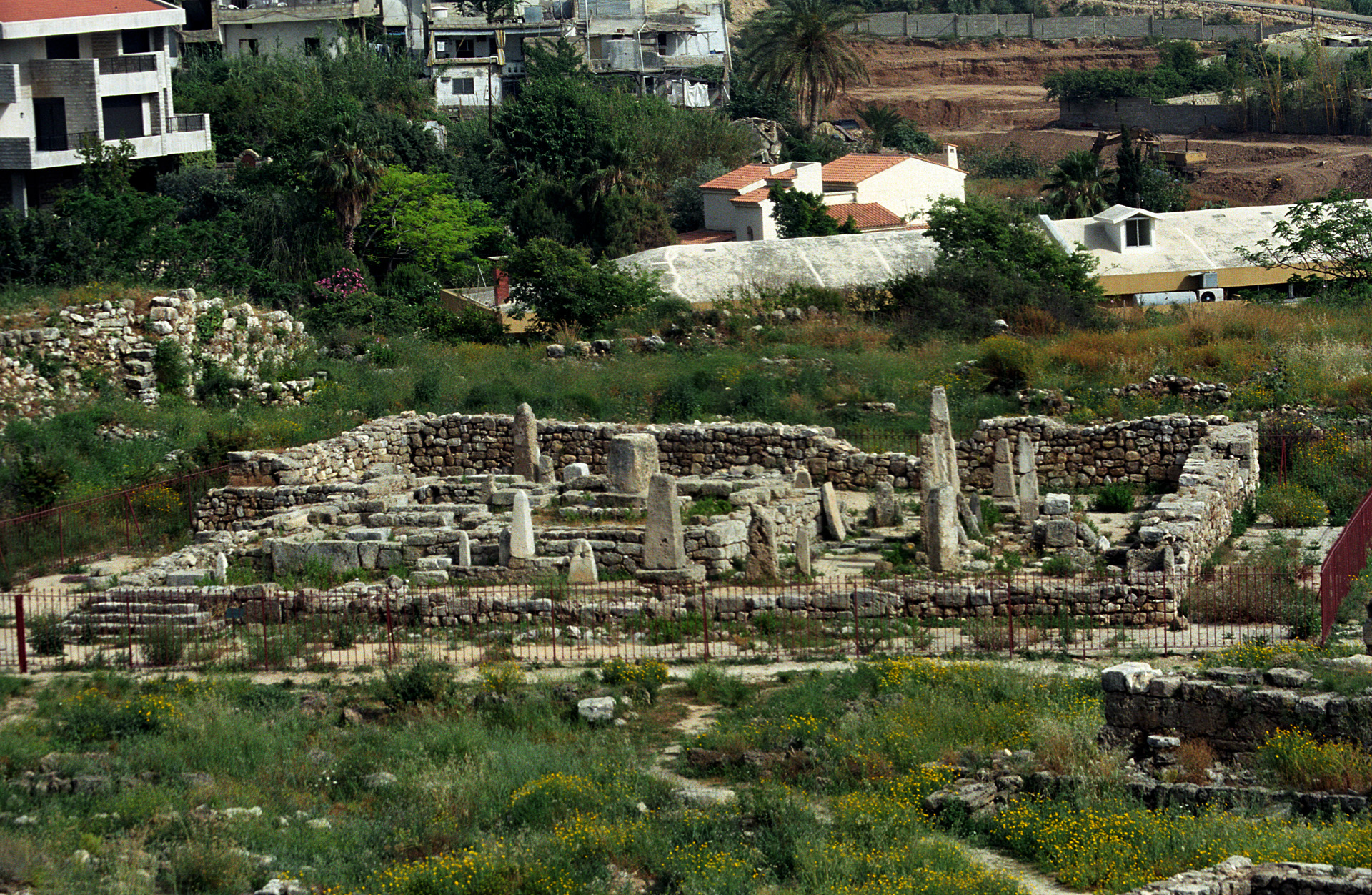
- Temple of the Obeliques, Lebanon.

- Location within Lebanon
- 34°07′08″N 35°38′50″E
- Location: Byblos

Site notes
- Excavation dates: 1922

The Temple of the Obelisks (French: Temple aux Obelisques, Arabic: معبد الأنصاب, romanized: Maʿbad al-ʾAnṣāb, also known as the L-shaped Temple and Temple of Resheph was an important Bronze Age temple structure in the World Heritage Site of Byblos. It is considered "perhaps the most spectacular" of the ancient structures of Byblos. It is the best preserved building in the Byblos archaeological site.

Almost all of the artefacts found in the excavation of the temple are displayed at the National Museum of Beirut. It was excavated by French archaeologist Maurice Dunand from 1924-73. The original temple is now in two parts: the base is known as "the L-shaped temple", and the top is known as the "Temple of the Obelisks"; the latter was moved 40 meters east during Maurice Dunand's excavations.

Dunand uncovered 1306 Byblos figurines – ex-voto offerings, including faience figurines, weapons, and dozens of bronze-with-gold-leaf figurines – which have become the "poster child" of the Lebanese Tourism Ministry.

== Description ==
=== Base: L Shaped Temple ===
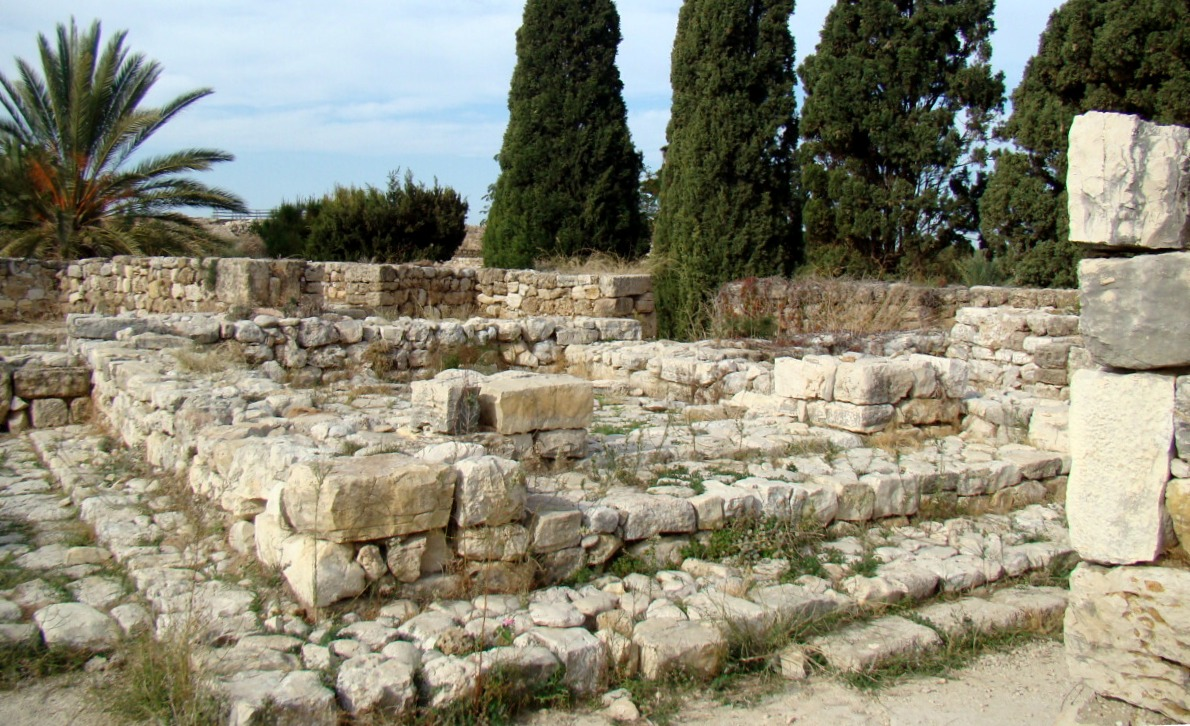
The L Shaped Temple

The L-shaped Temple was constructed around 2600 BCE, two centuries after the construction of the Temple of Baalat Gebal (approximately 100m to the west) had been built. It was named the "L-shaped" temple by Dunand, as its two rooms and the courtyard were arranged in such a shape.

The temple had well built walls and temples, in contrast to the later Obelisk temple. It is thought that the L-shaped temple was burned down at the end of the Early Bronze Age.

=== Top: Obelisk Temple ===
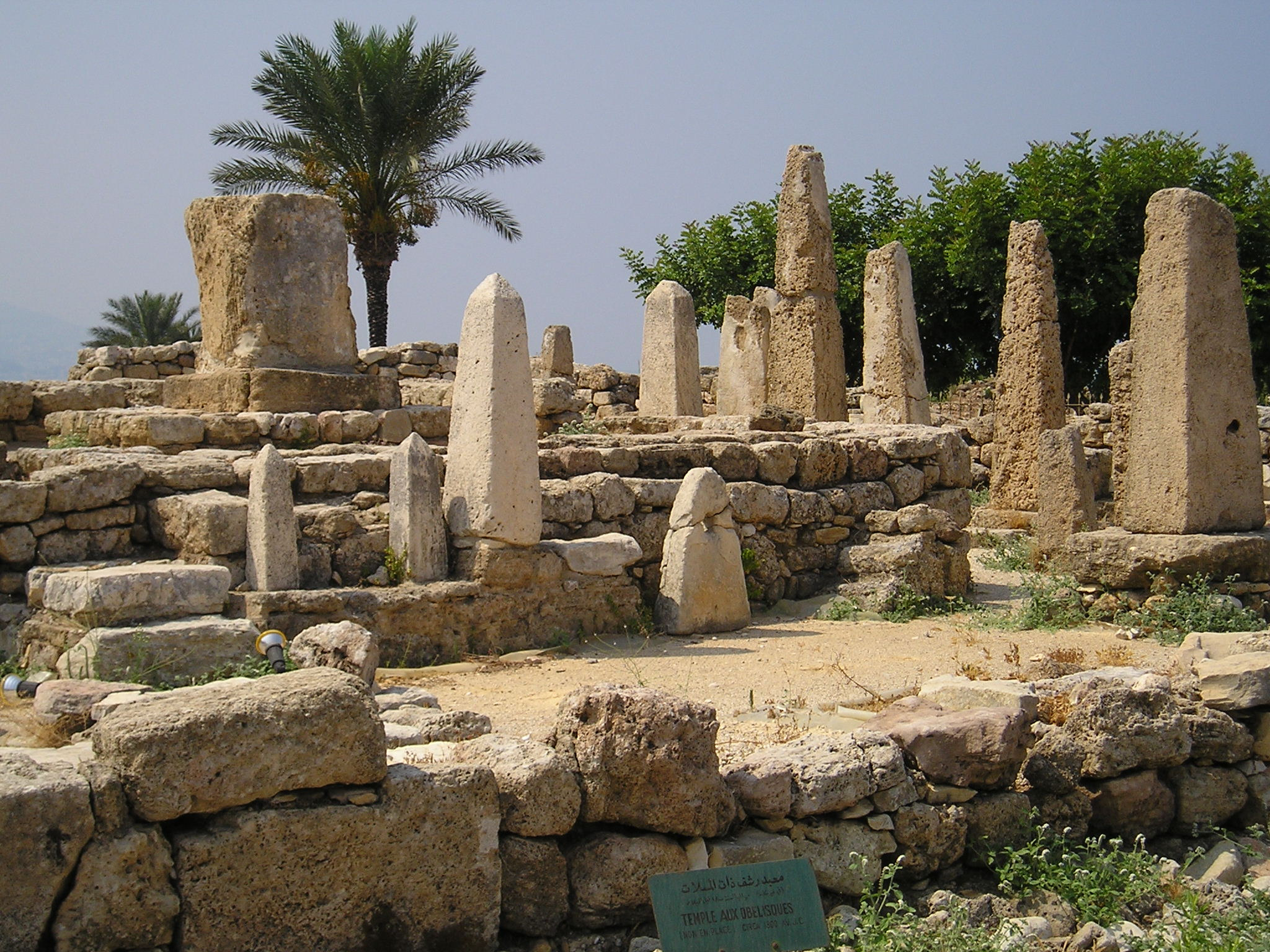
The Obelisk Temple

The Temple of the Obelisks was constructed around 1600 BCE on top of the L-shaped temple, retaining its general outline. The temple's name, given by Dunand, refers to a number of obelisks and standing stones located in a court around the cella. Since it had been built on top of the L-shaped temple, it was necessary for Dunand to dismantle and move this upper temple in order to excavate the structure underneath.

The Monument is suggested to be in use from the start of EB III to the end of EB because of fire, as the L-shaped Temple, and was rebuilt as the Temple of Obelisks to be used from the Middle Bronze Age until the Iron Age or even later. Because of the problematic excavation record and the absence of content on stratigraphy in Renan and Montet’s publication, as well as the unfinished publications from Dunand, the archaeological research in Byblos became more difficult.

=== Purpose of the structure ===
As an open-air sanctuary, the Temple of Obelisks serves multiple functions in the ancient Byblos, including a place for ritual practice. Unlike the L-shaped temple, which was dedicated to the male tutelary god of the city, the Temple of Obelisks did not have a god to worship but probably followed the tradition of the Syro-Palestinian cult.

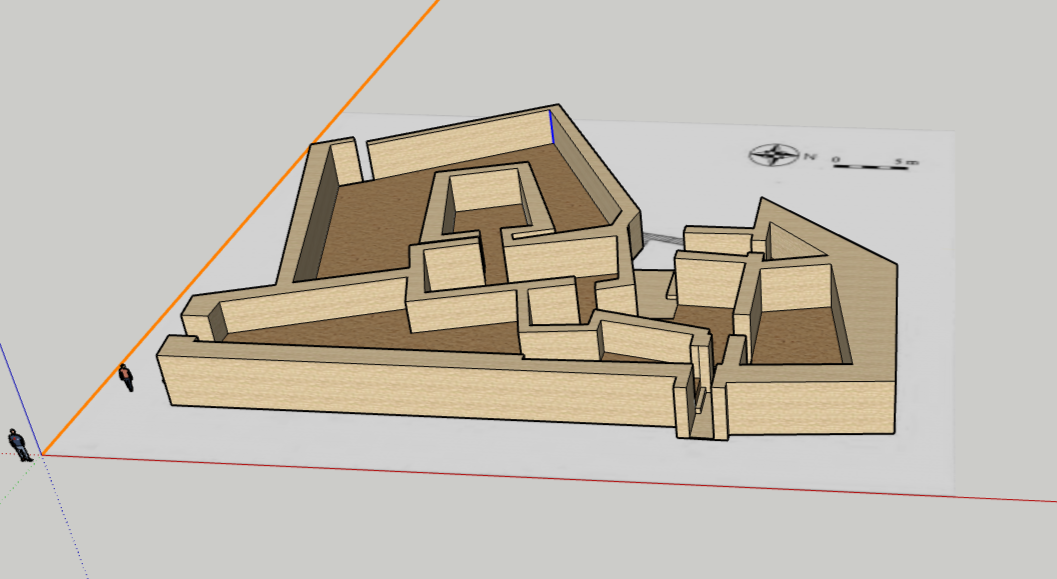
3D model of the Temple of Obelisks from East Side

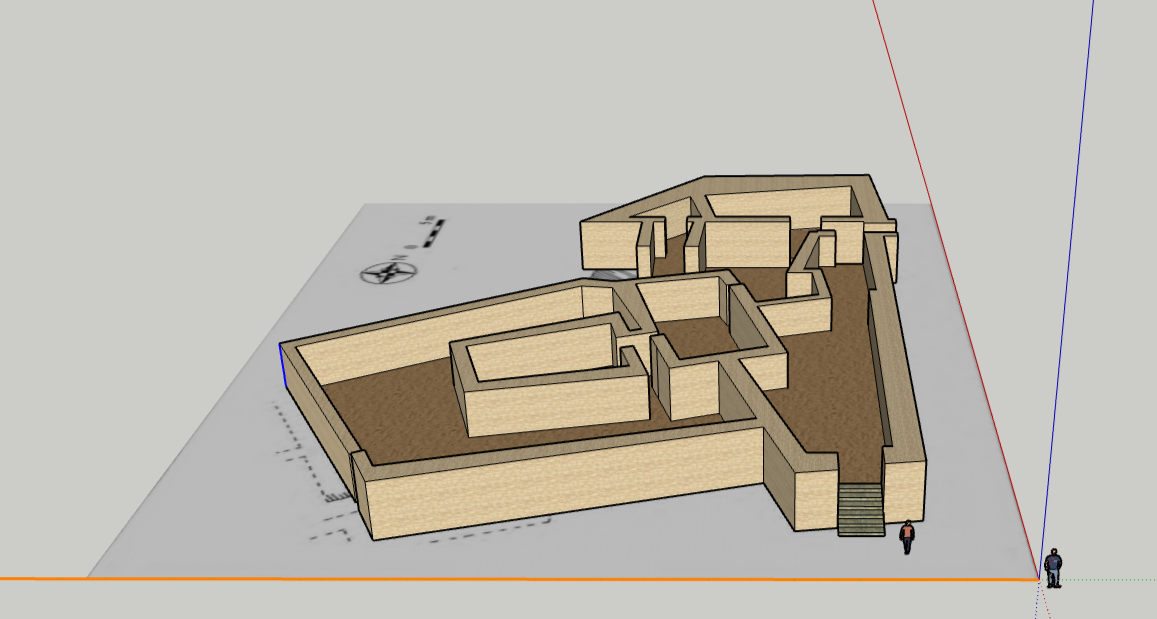
3D model of the Temple of Obelisks from South Side

There are in total 7 main cultic buildings built or rebuilt in a similar period around the central spring and artificial lake at the Byblos site. Current evidence suggests each building formed a neighbourhood and network with house clusters around, fostering intraregional competition for access to resources despite the redistribution of resources is also seen in the site.

The Temple of Obelisk is located next to the Temple of Lady Byblos; a significant amount of Egyptian goods was excavated from the Temple of Lady Byblos, suggesting its stronger bond and interaction with Egyptians during the Early Bronze Age; While the temple of the Obelisks and its former L-shaped Temple were found to have Syrian-inspired designs, suggesting different monuments or neighbourhoods may be in contact with different regions separately. It is also suggested that the temple had been the place for trading or other vital economic activities from the large number of artefacts excavated and the existence of a jeweler’s workshop in the temple.

In contrast to the L-shaped temple, the Obelisk temple was built with irregular walls. Among the significant discoveries within the temple was that of the Abishemu Obelisk, a limestone obelisk created around 1800 BCE commemorating the Phoenician king Abishemu I of Byblos. Written in Egyptian hieroglyphs, it includes an inscription which scholars have identified as a dedication to Heryshaf, whose appearance here tied to a Canaanite context is widely interpreted—though debated—as the Egyptian syncretic form of the Canaanite war god, Resheph.

== Modern identification and excavation ==
The temple was first identified by Dunand. The majority of the obelisks found were underground in their original positions, standing upright, while a few others were discovered buried in a favissa (a well for votive deposits).

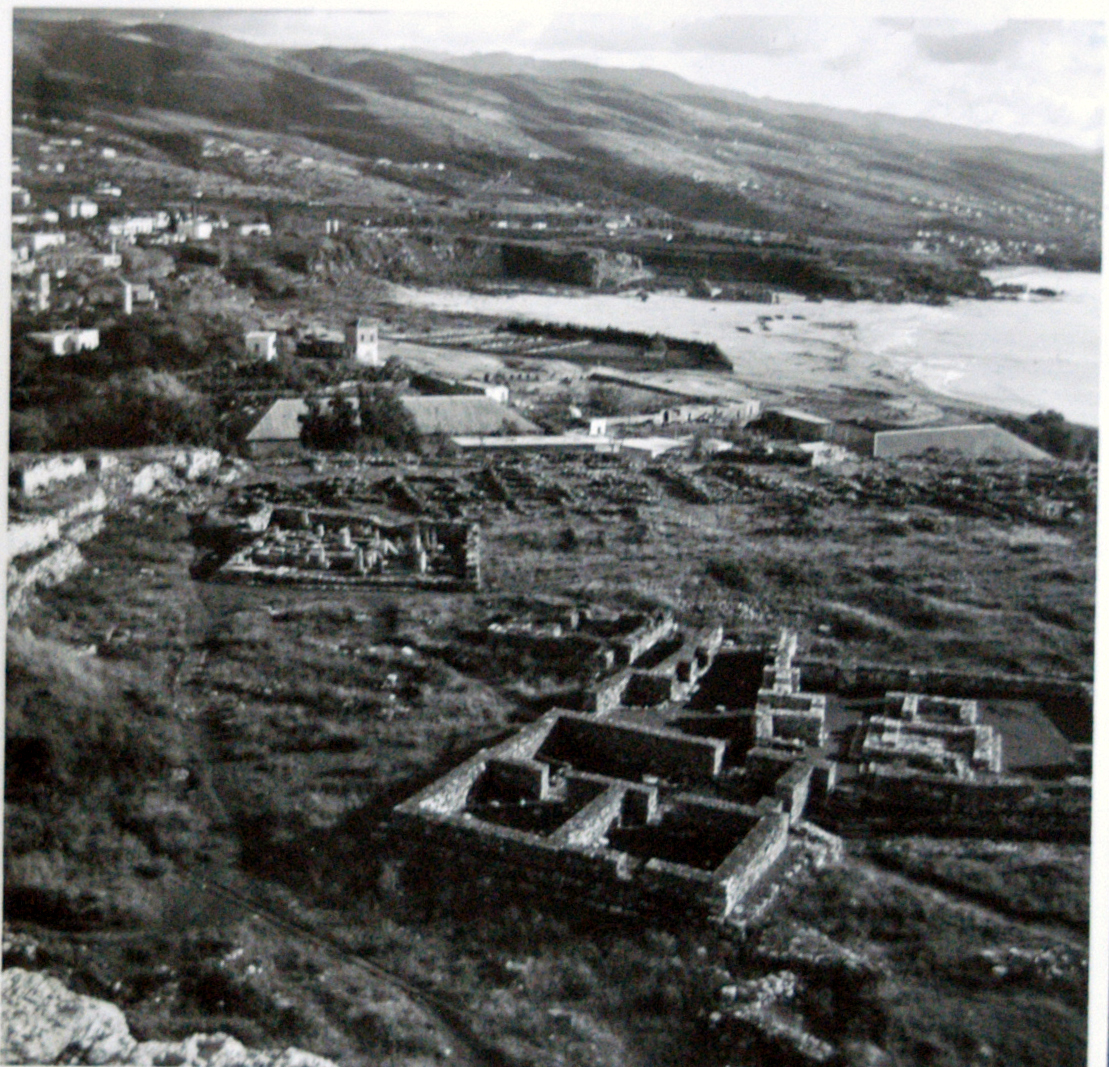
1959 view of the temple base and top

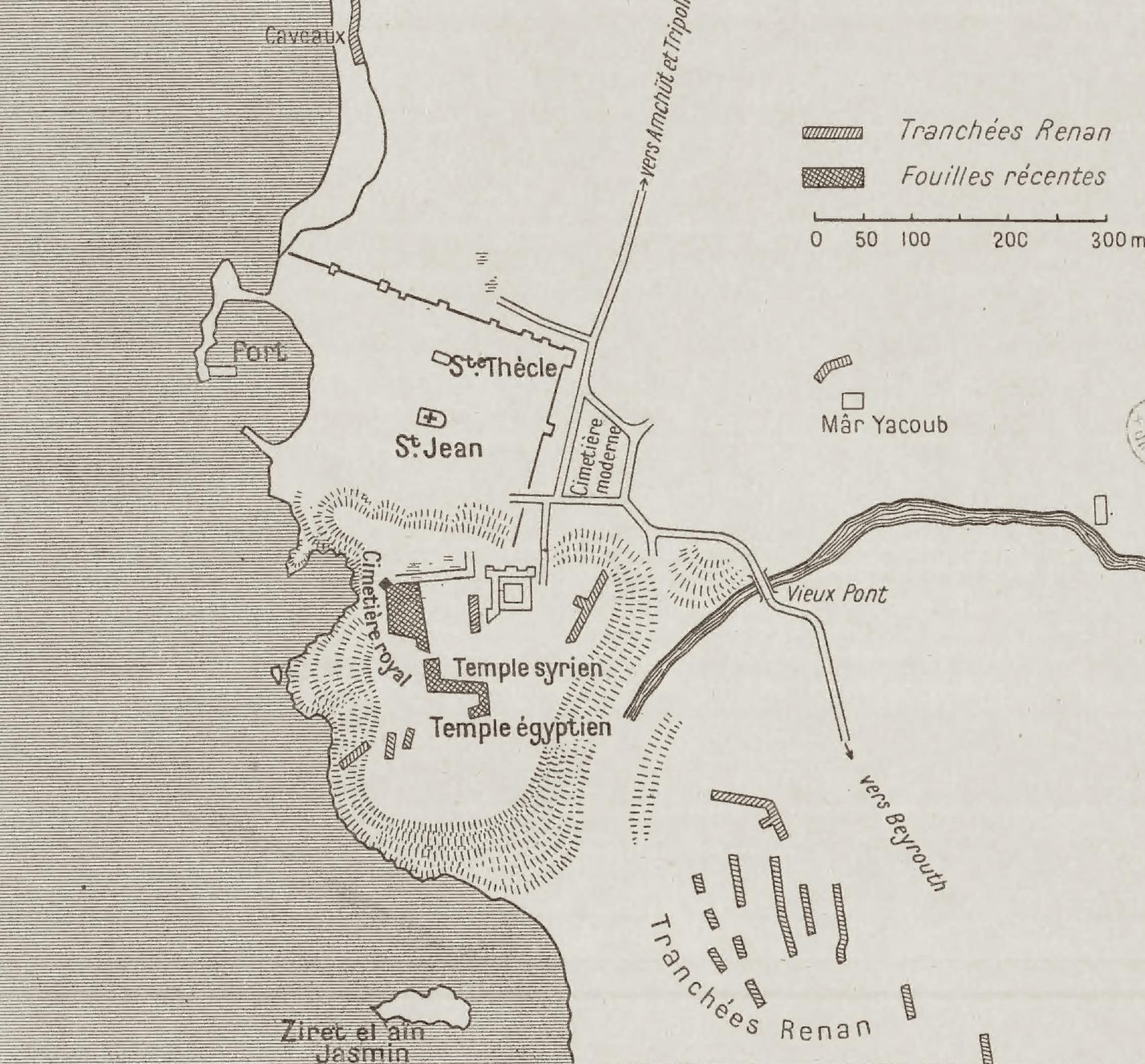
Montet's 1924 diagram of the Byblos archaeological site

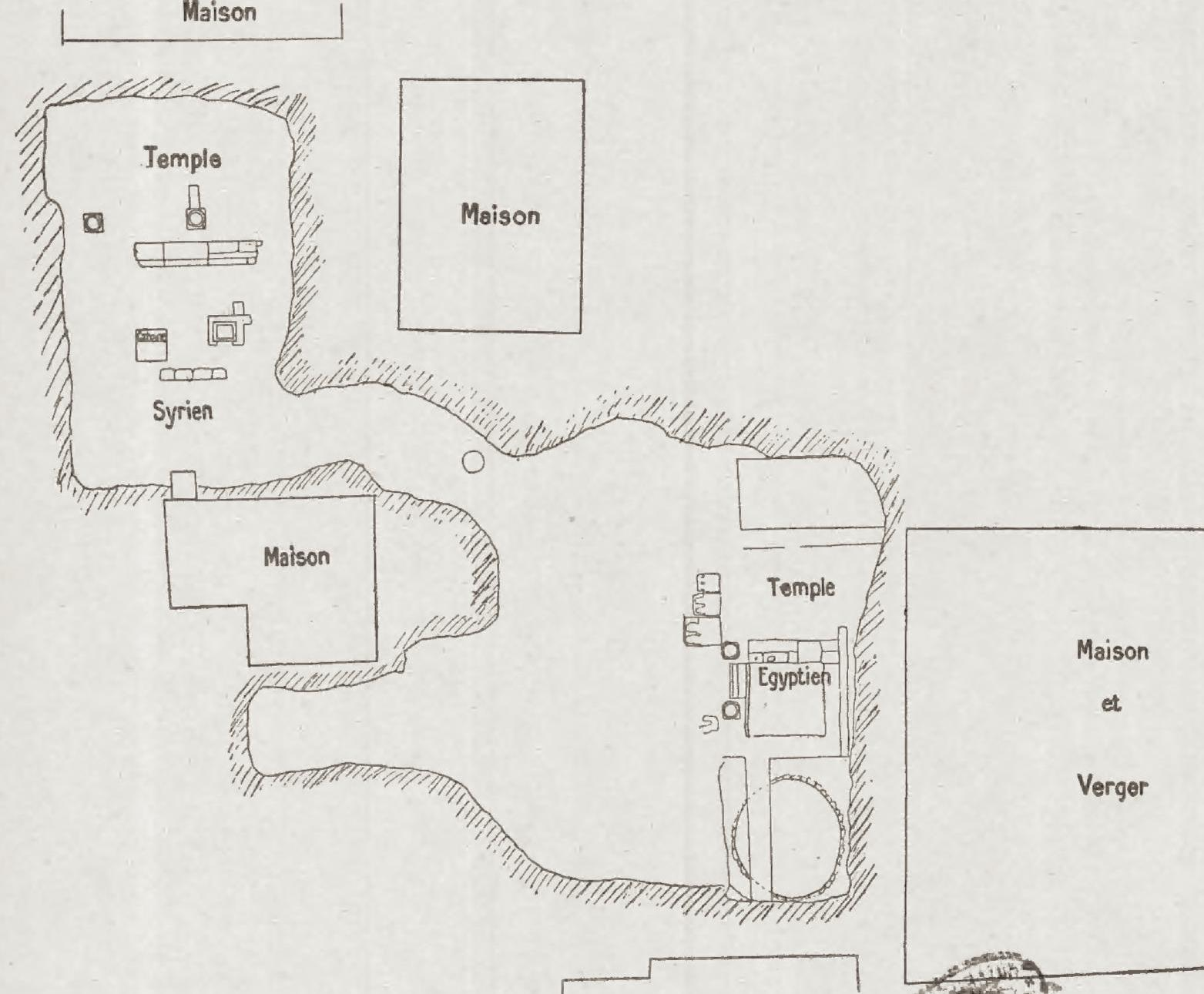
Montet's 1924 diagram of the Byblos temples

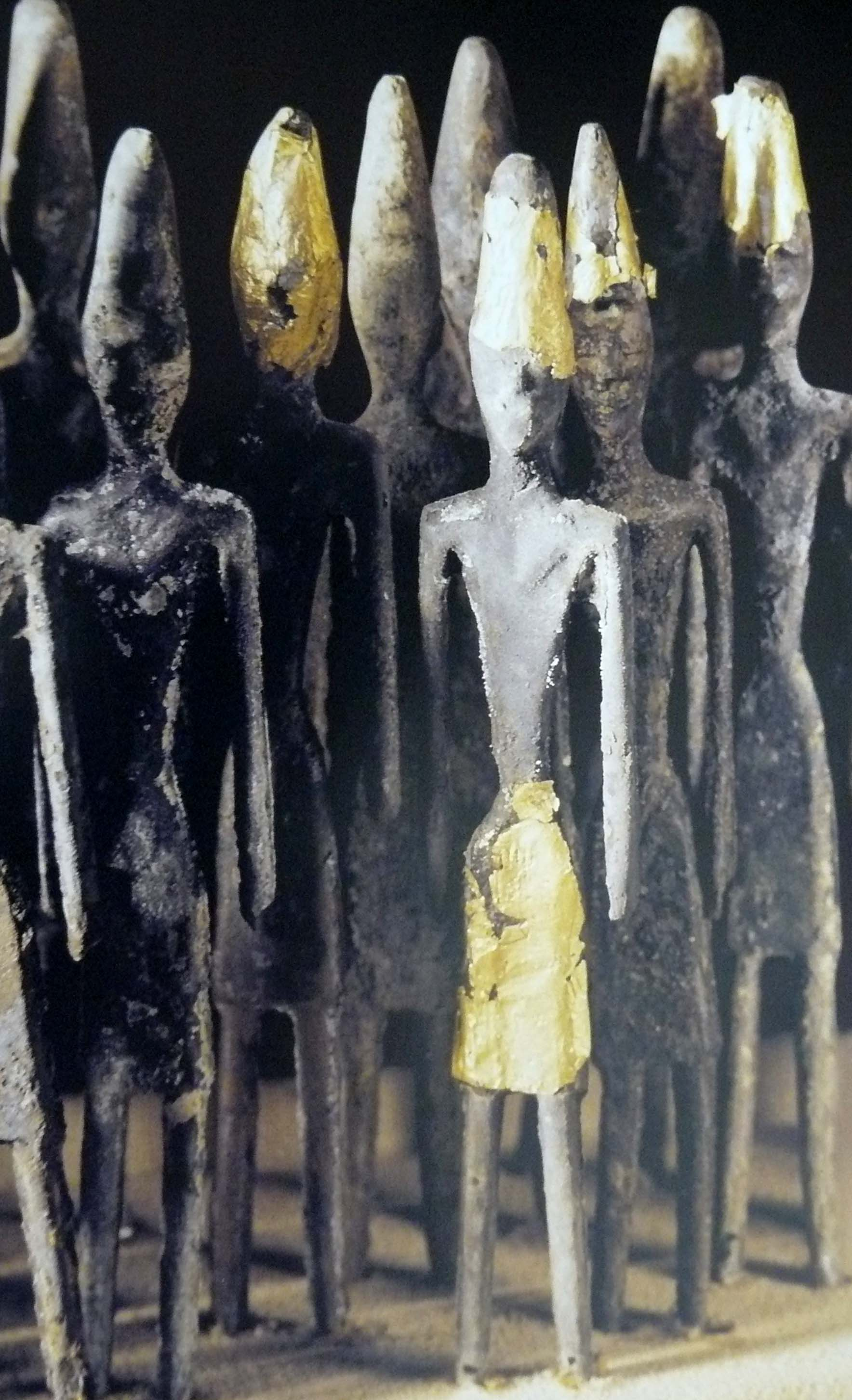
The Byblos figurines

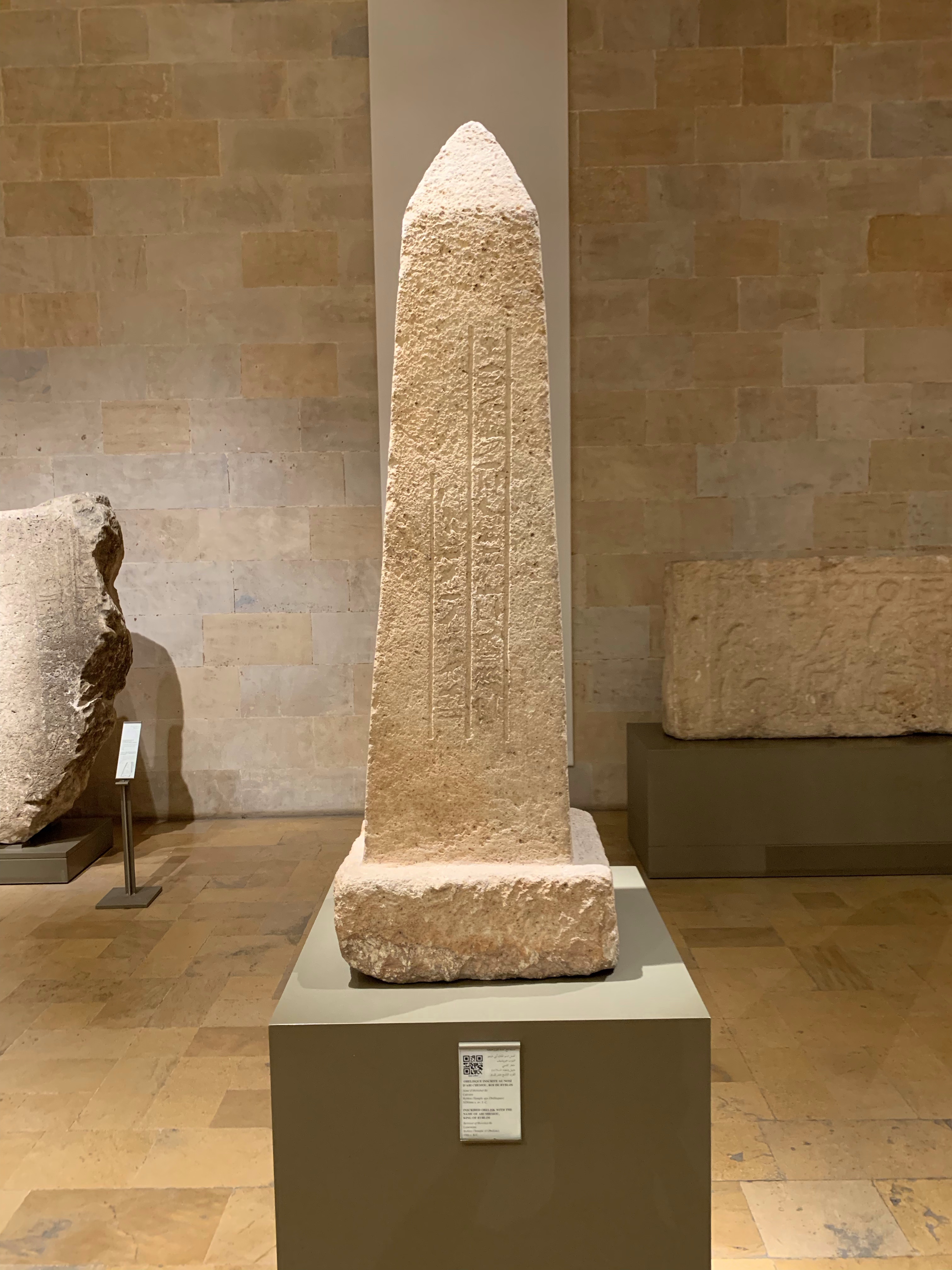
The Abishemu obelisk

== See also ==
Royal necropolis of Byblos – Phoenician necropolis in Lebanon

== Sources ==
- Boda, Sharon La (1994). International Dictionary of Historic Places: Middle East and Africa. Taylor & Francis. ISBN 978-1-884964-03-9.
- Bryce, Trevor (10 September 2009). The Routledge Handbook of the Peoples and Places of Ancient Western Asia: The Near East from the Early Bronze Age to the Fall of the Persian Empire. Routledge. ISBN 978-1-134-15908-6.
- Kilani, Marwan (2016), Byblos in the Late Bronze Age: interactions between the Levantine and Egyptian worlds, University of Oxford
- Kilani, Marwan (24 October 2019). Byblos in the Late Bronze Age: Interactions Between the Levantine and Egyptian Worlds. Brill. ISBN 978-90-04-41659-8.
- Michaelides, Demetrios (2001), Report on Mission to Byblos (Lebanon), International Council on Monuments and Sites
- Ripamonti, Cecilia (2024), "SACRED ARCHITECTURE IN MIDDLE AND LATE BRONZE AGE LEVANT.", Vicino Oriente XXVIII N.S., SAPIENZA UNIVERSITÀ DI ROMA
- Sala, Maura (2015). "Early and Middle Bronze Age Temples at Byblos: specificity and Levantine interconnections". BAAL Hors-Série. pp. 31–58. ISSN 1683-0083.
- Vreeze, Michel de; Badreshany, Kamal Patrick (2023), Identity and Monumentality: The Construction of an Early Bronze Age Landscape on the Lebanese Coast., Journal of Ancient Egyptian Interconnections

=== Archaeological reports ===
- Dunand, Maurice (1937). Fouilles de Byblos: Atlas : 1926-1932. P. Geuthner.
