= Son of Safatba'al inscription =

5h-century BC Phoenician inscription

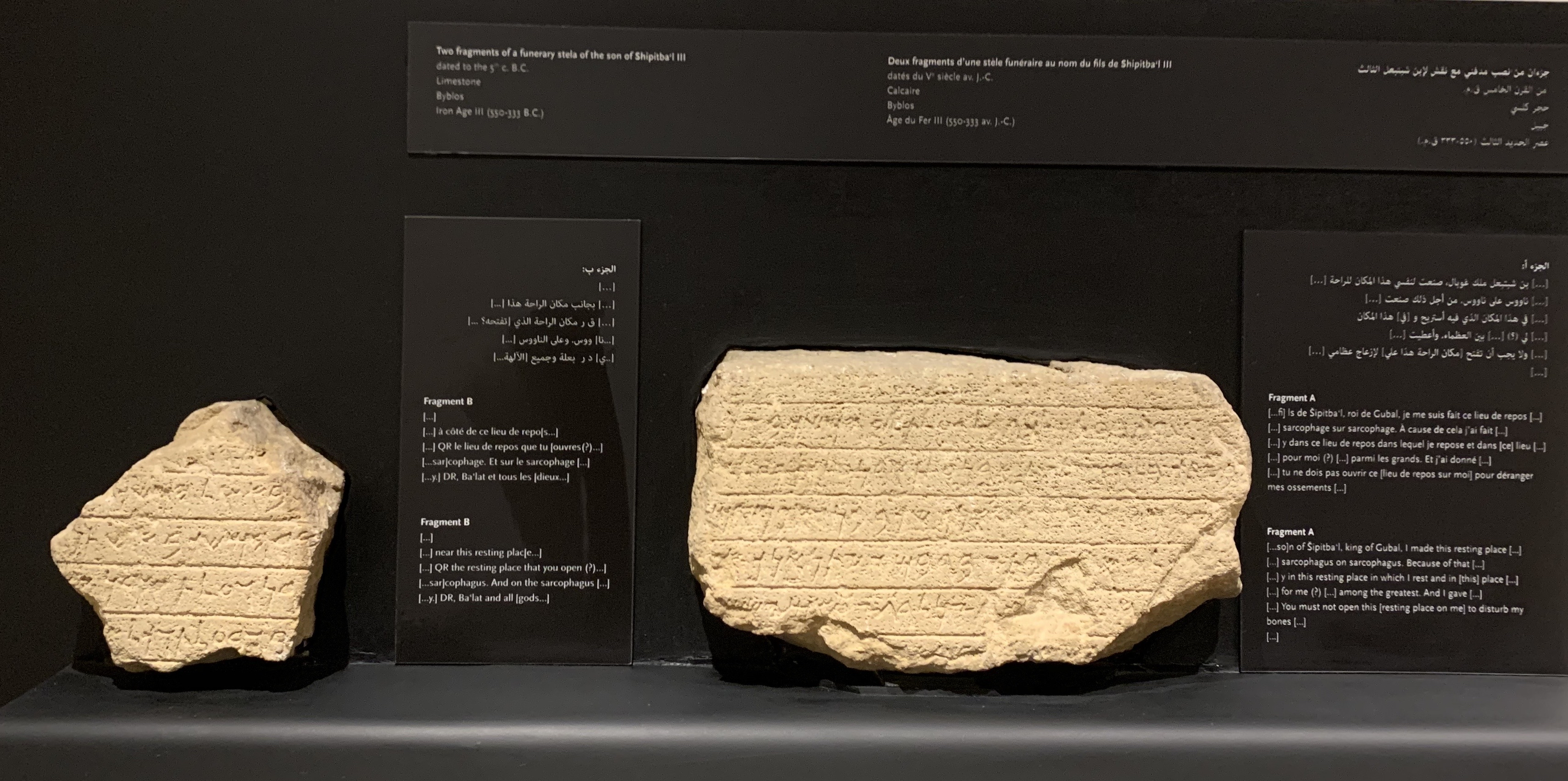
Son of Safatba'al inscription

The Son of Safatba'al inscription is a Phoenician inscription (KAI 9) dated to c. 500-475 BCE.

It was published in Maurice Dunand's Fouilles de Byblos (volume I, 1926–1932, numbers 1143, plate XXXIII).

It is currently at the National Museum of Beirut.

== Text of the inscription ==
Three parts of the inscription are extant. The largest, fragment A (six lines), reads:

[’NK *** B]N ŠPṬB‘L MLK GBL
[I, *** (name unknown), the so]n of Safatbaal, King of Byblos,

P‘LT LY HMŠKB ZN [...
I made for myself this resting-place (tomb) [...

...]BYTK BL T[QM LŠT] ’RN ‘LT ’RN
...] your tomb (?). You shall not per[sist in placing] coffin upon coffin.

‘L KN P‘L[T LY HMŠKB ZN ...
For this reason have I mad[e for myself this resting-place ...

... WP‘L ’NK ’RN ZN L]Y BMŠKB ZN ’Š ’NK ŠKB BN
... and I made this coffin for mys]elf in this resting-place that I (am) lying in.

WBMQM [ZN ...
And in [this] place [...

...]LY ’N[K ..]TY BRBM WYTN ’NK ’[...
...] for myself I [...] among the generals. And I gave [...

... ’L TPT]Ḥ ‘[LT HMŠKB] ZN LRGZ ‘ṢMY ’[M...
... you shall not ope]n this [resting-place] to disturb my bones. [...

...(?)ŠM]Š ‘L[M...
... Ete]rnal Se[mes (Sun-goddess) (?) ...

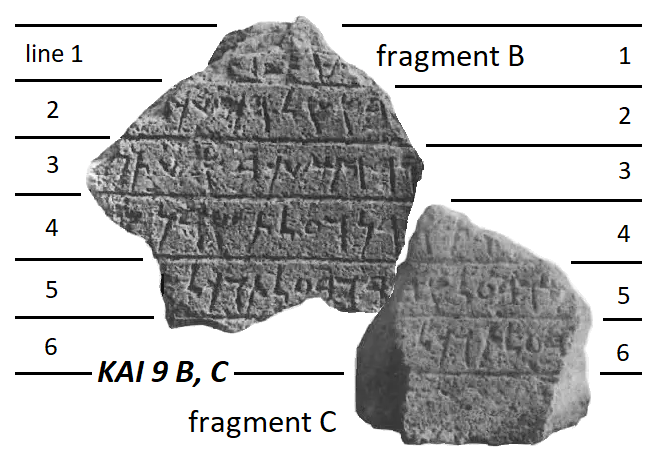
Composite picture of fragments B and C

Two smaller fragments, B and C, have been joined together and are now known as fragment B. It reads:

...]H[...
...

... ’L TP‘L LK MŠK]B ’ṢL HMŠK[B ZN ...
... You shall not make for yourself a resting-pla]ce (tomb) adjacent to [this] resting-pla[ce! ...

...]QR HMŠKB ’Š TP[TḤ...
...]QR(?) the resting-place that you op[en ...

... ’L YŠT ’Y]T ’RNW ‘LT ’RN ’N[K...
... Let him not place] his coffin upon a coffin. I[...

... B‘LŠM]M WB‘L ’DR WB‘LT WKL ’[LN GBL ...
... Baalsame]m and Baal ’Iddīr and Baalat and all the god[s of Byblos ...

...]B‘LT WKL [’L ...
...] Baalat and all the [gods ...

== Bibliography ==
- Christopher Rollston, "The Dating of the Early Royal Byblian Phoenician Inscriptions: A Response to Benjamin Sass." MAARAV 15 (2008): 57–93.
- Benjamin Mazar, The Phoenician Inscriptions from Byblos and the Evolution of the Phoenician-Hebrew Alphabet, in The Early Biblical Period: Historical Studies (S. Ahituv and B. A. Levine, eds., Jerusalem: IES, 1986 [original publication: 1946]): 231–247.
- William F. Albright, The Phoenician Inscriptions of the Tenth Century B.C. from Byblus, JAOS 67 (1947): 153–154.
