= Kings of Byblos =

The Kings of Byblos were the rulers of the city-state of Byblos, the ancient Phoenician city in what is now Lebanon.

Scholars have pieced together the fragmented list from various archaeological finds since the 19th century.

== Early Bronze Age ==
- Ib-dadi, contemporary of Amar-Sin (r. 2046–2037 BC) at the end of Early Bronze IVB (c.2150-2020/2000 BCE).

== Middle Bronze Age ==
Some kings of Byblos from an early period are known from Egyptian and local finds:

- Abishemu I, probably contemporary of Amenemhat III (late 12th Dynasty of Egypt).
- Yapi-shemu-abi, contemporary of Amenemhat IV (late 12th Dynasty of Egypt).
- Yakin-ilu, contemporary of Sehetepibre I/II.
- Yantin-ʿammu, contemporary of Zimri-Lim (r. 1775-1760 BCE). Some speculate that he is identical to Yantin, contemporary of Neferhotep I (mid-late 13th Dynasty of Egypt).

Uncertain rulers:

- Ilima-yapi? - a prince, not explicitly of Byblos.
- Ḥasrurum son of Rum, a ruler of the land of Byblos, probably contemporary of Sihathor.
- Abishemu II.
- Yapaʿ-shemu-abi, son of Abishemu (probably the second).
- ʿegel, son of Abishemu (probably the second), probably identical to ʿegliya (whose father name is unknown).

== Late Bronze Age ==
=== Egyptian period ===
- Rib-Hadda, writer of dozens of Amarna letters. c.1350 BC.
- Ili-Rapih, writer of two of Amarna letters. c.1320 BC.

== Iron Age ==
=== Phoenician period ===
- Zakar Baal, mentioned in Story of Wenamun. 1100s BC.
- 1000s BC Ahiram
- c.1000 BC Zakar Baal (II?)
- c.980 BC Ithobaal? Pilsibaal?
- c.940 BC Yehimilk
- c.930 BC Abibaal
- c.920 BC Elibaal
- c.900 BC Safatba'al (I)

=== Assyrian period ===
Ashurnasirpal II received tributes from the kings of the sea coast, among them the king of Byblos.

- Safatba‘al II (Sibitti-biʿil in Akkadian), mentioned among the kings of who brought payment to Tiglath-Pileser III in his 8th year (738 BC).
- Urumilki (Ūru-milki in Akkadian), mentioned in a list of the kings of the land Amurru (the Levant) who brought tribute to Sennacherib in his campaign in the Levant.
- Milkiashapa (Milki-ašapa in Akkadian), mentioned among the kings of the Levant and Cyprus who were summoned and ordered to send tribute to Esarhaddon, c.670 BC. Milki-Ashapa is also mentioned in the first campaign of Ashurbanipal.
- c.650 BC Yehawmelek

== Classical Age ==
=== Persian period ===
- c. 500 BC Safatba'al (III)
- c. 480 BC Urimilk II
- c. 470 BC Yeḥarbaal (son of Urimilk II)
- c. 450 BC Yehawmilk (son of Yeḥarbaal)

Based on coins:

- c. 425 BC Elpaal (’LP‘L)
- c. 400 BC ‘Ozbaal (‘ZB‘L; son of Batnoam and the priest Paltibaal)
- c. 375 BC Urimilk III (’WRMLK)
- 332 BC ‘Aynel (‘YN’L; Enylus), who cooperated with Alexander the Great in the siege of Tyre.
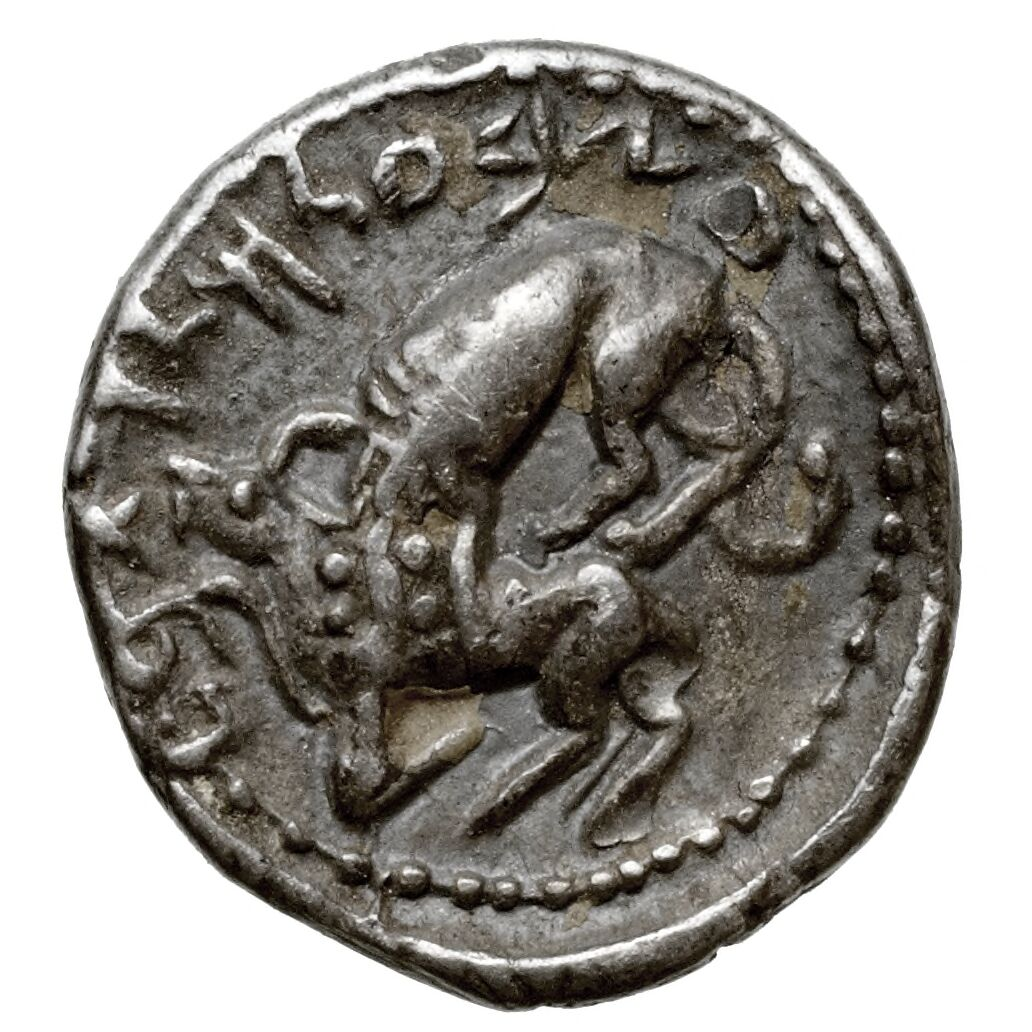
‘ZB‘L coin

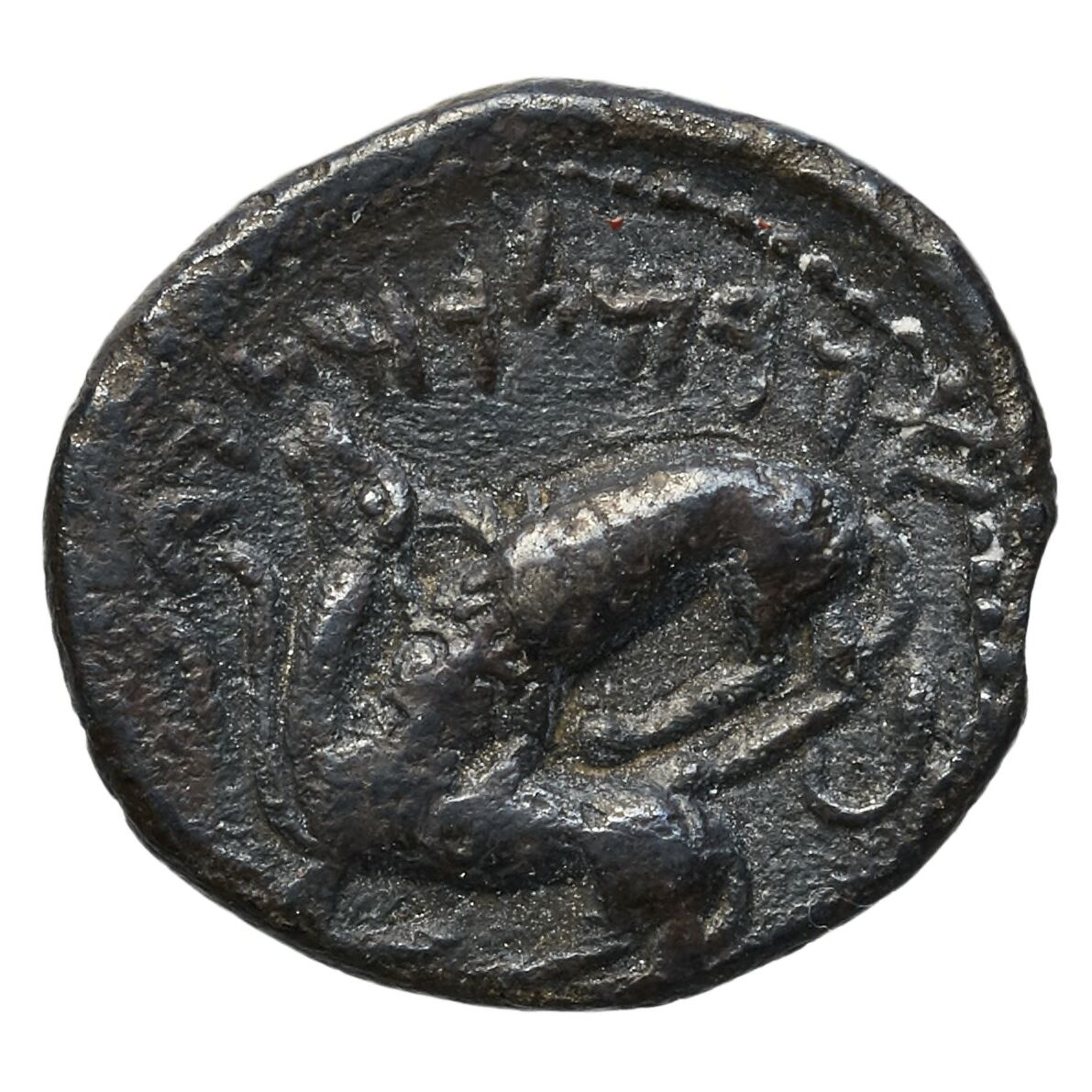
’WRMLK coin

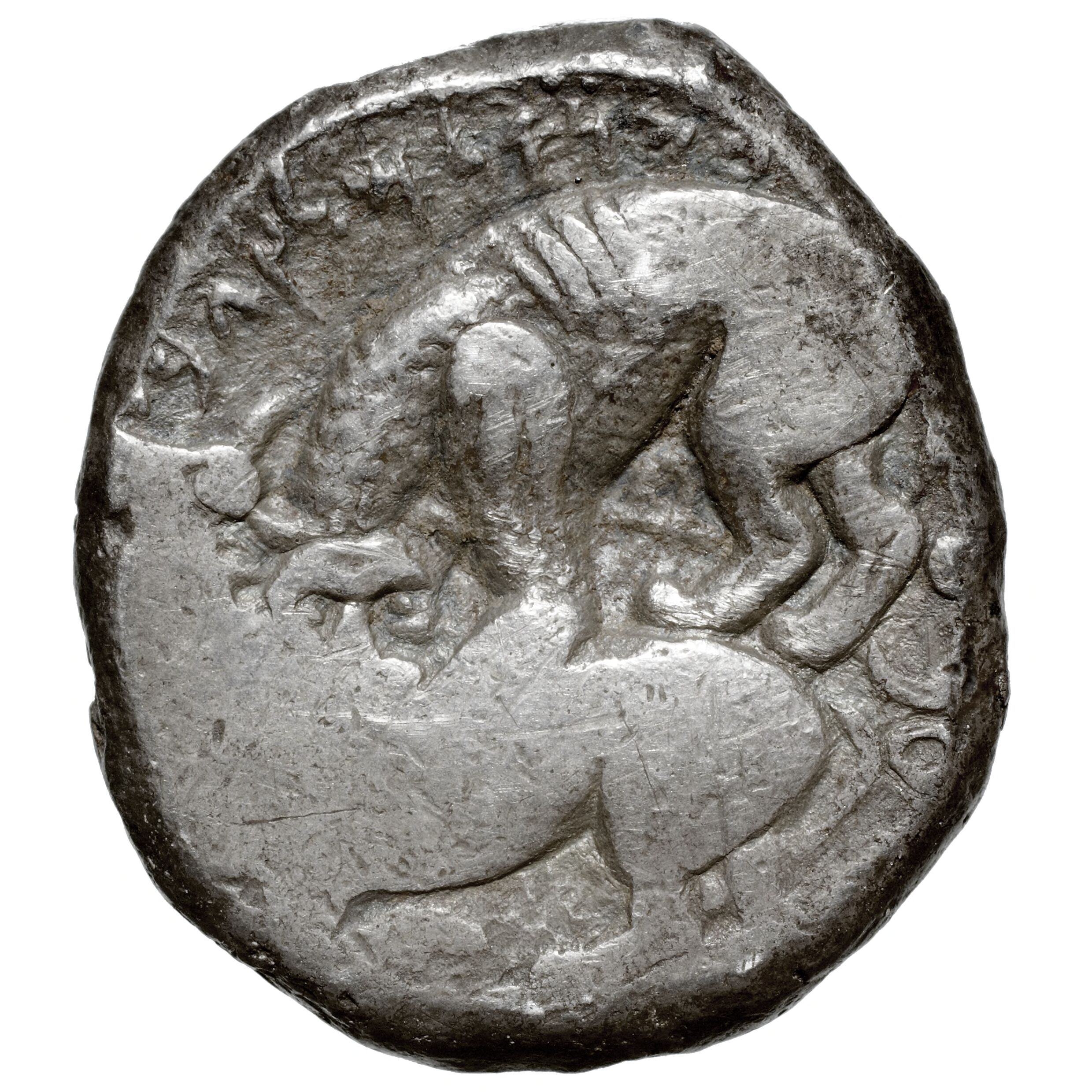
‘YN’L coin

=== Roman period ===
- 68 BC Cinyrus

== See also ==
- King of Tyre
- King of Sidon
