= Statue of the Tiber river with Romulus and Remus =

Ancient Roman sculpture

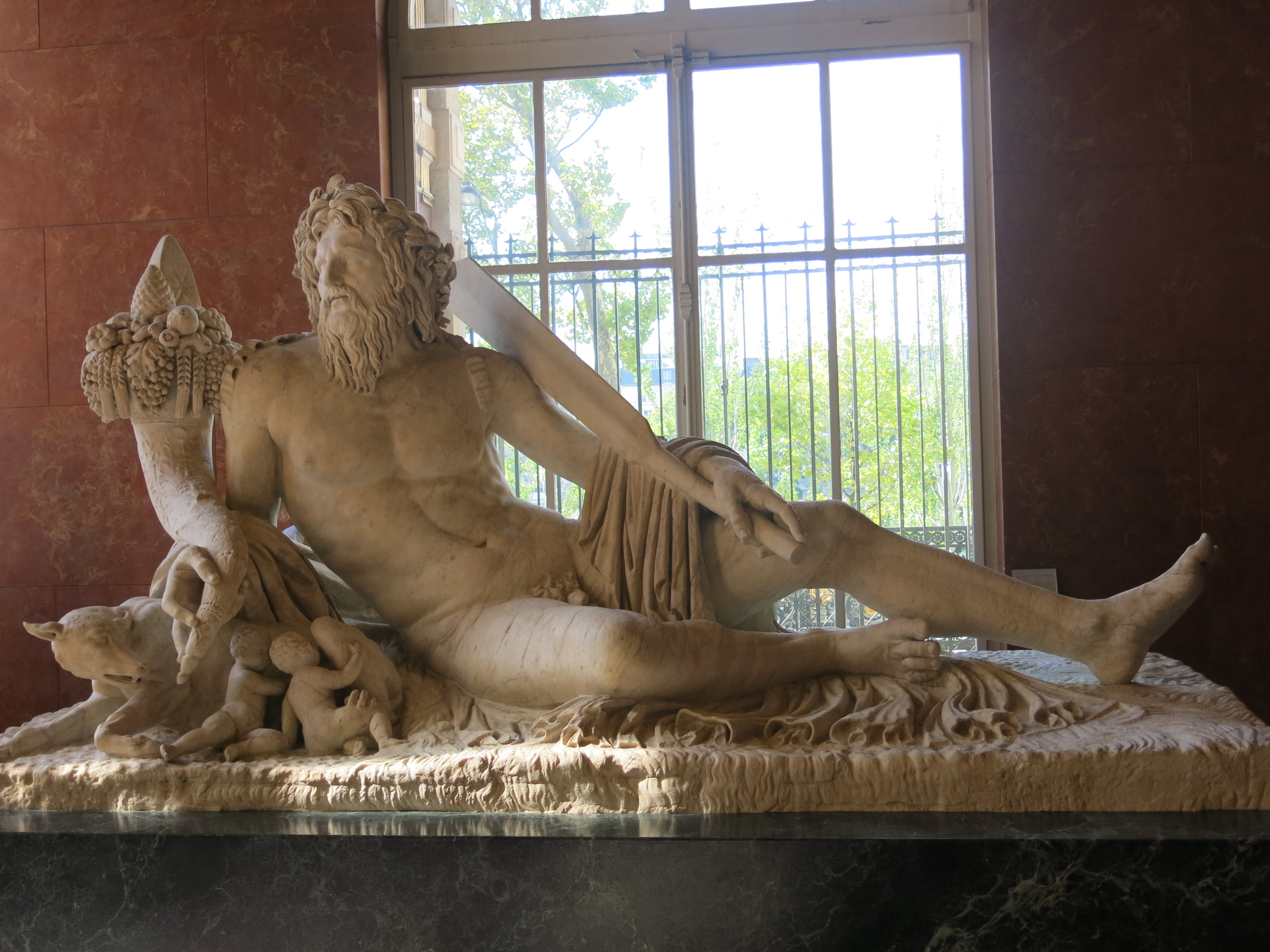
- Overview

- Location within Rome
- 41.8972°N 12.4791°E
- Type: Statue
- Location: Campus Martius

History
- Built: 1st or 2nd century CE

The Statue of the Tiber river with Romulus and Remus is a large statue from ancient Rome exhibited at the Louvre museum in Paris, France. It is an allegory of the Tiber river that waters the city of Rome.

== Description ==
The Tiber is depicted as a middle-aged man, bearded and reclining, according to the typical pattern for representations of river gods. In his hands, he holds the attributes that signify the benefits he bestows on Rome:

- In his left hand, an oar represents navigation;
- In his right hand, a cornucopia represents the nourishing virtues of the river.

Under the right arm of the god lies the she-wolf which, according to legend, suckled the twins Romulus and Remus who had been abandoned in the Tiber and would later go on to found the city of Rome.

The base of the statue is decorated with reliefs depicting a scene of grazed fields, one of boatmen, and another relating to the tale of Aeneas.

The statue is 3.17 m wide, 2.22 m tall, and 1.31 m deep. It is carved from marble taken from Mount Pentelicus near Athens, Greece.

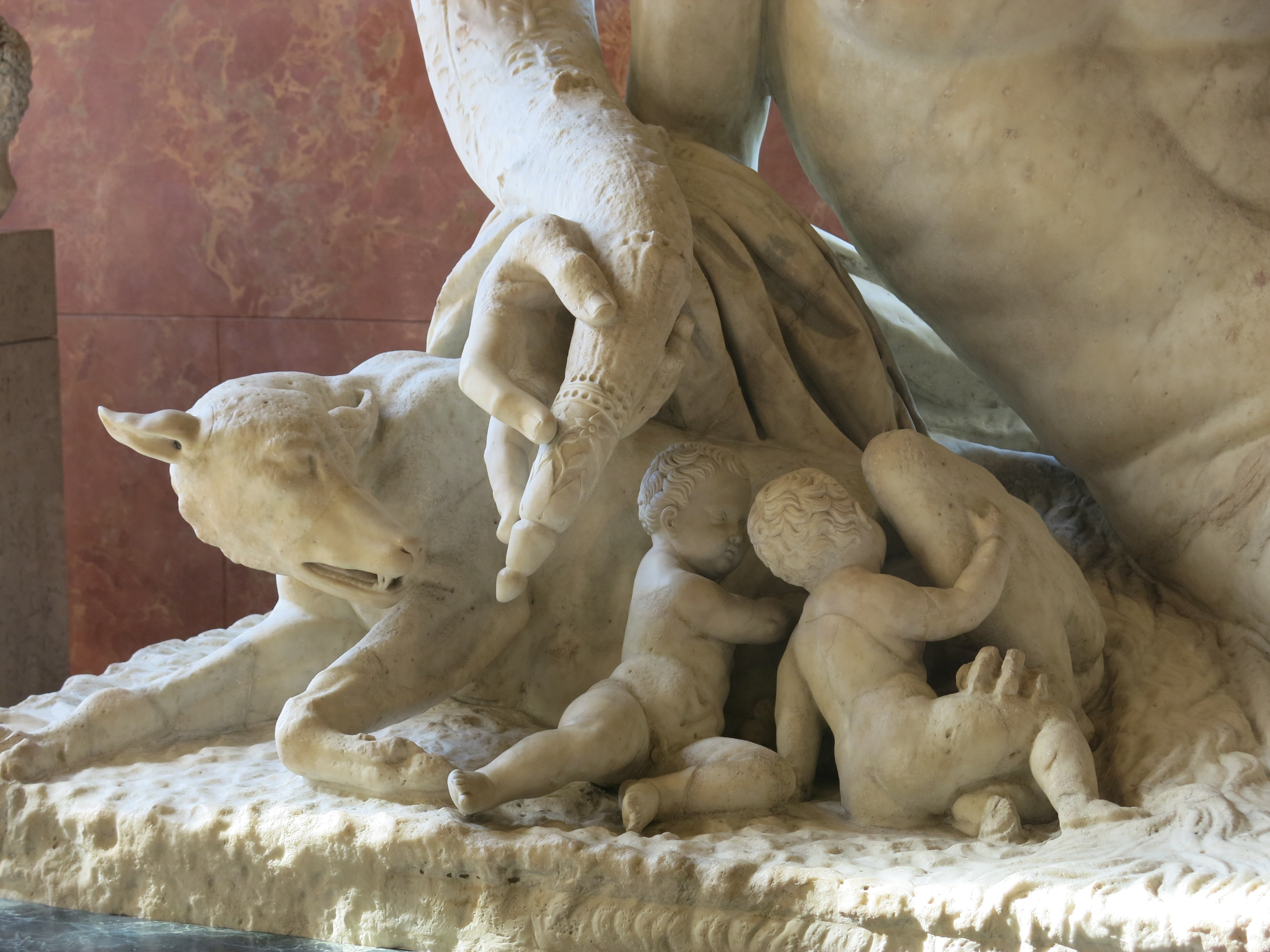
Romulus and Remus under an arm of the Tiber.

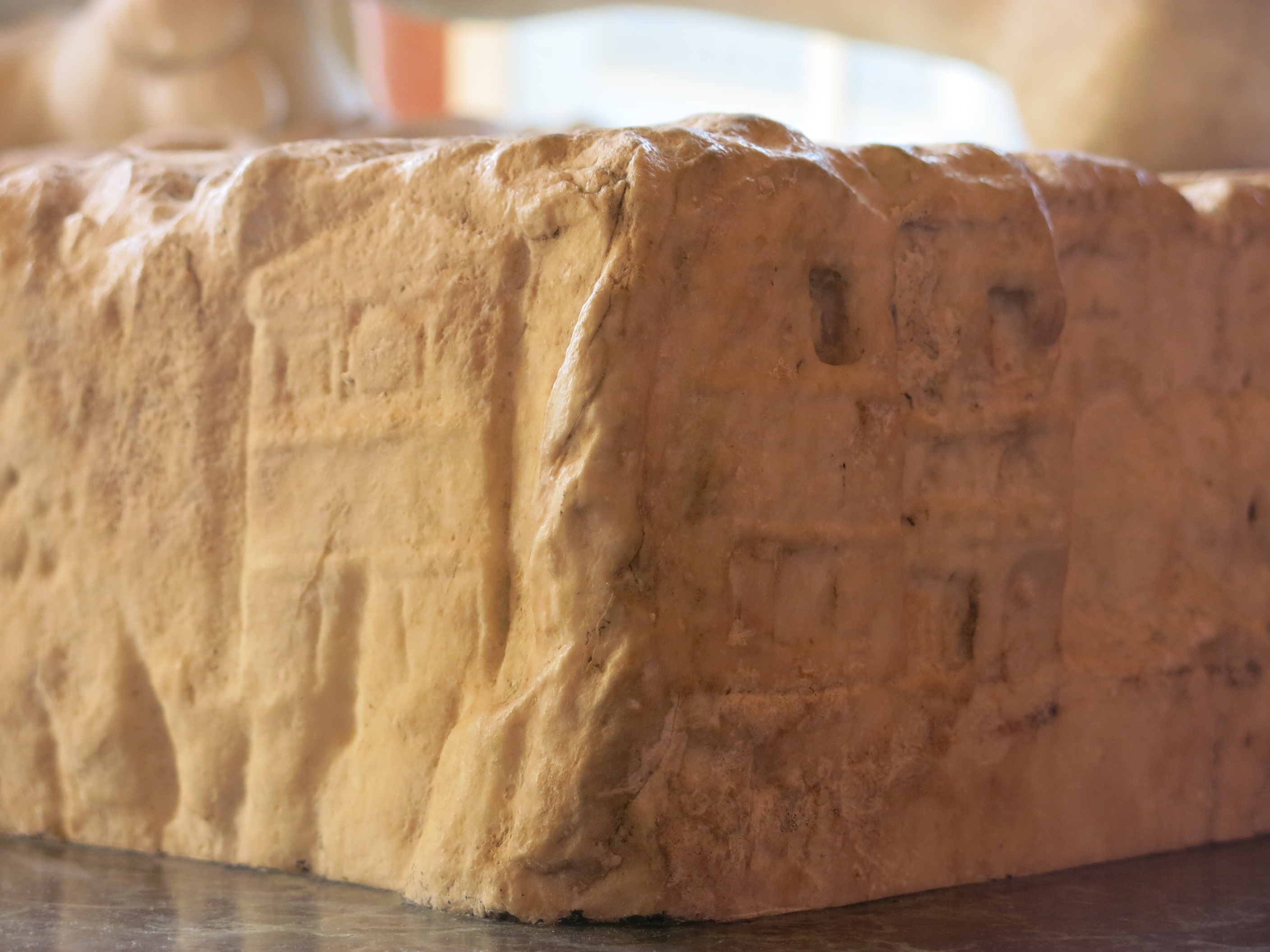
The House of Troy sacked by the Greeks and Aeneas fleeing before founding Rome.

== Location ==
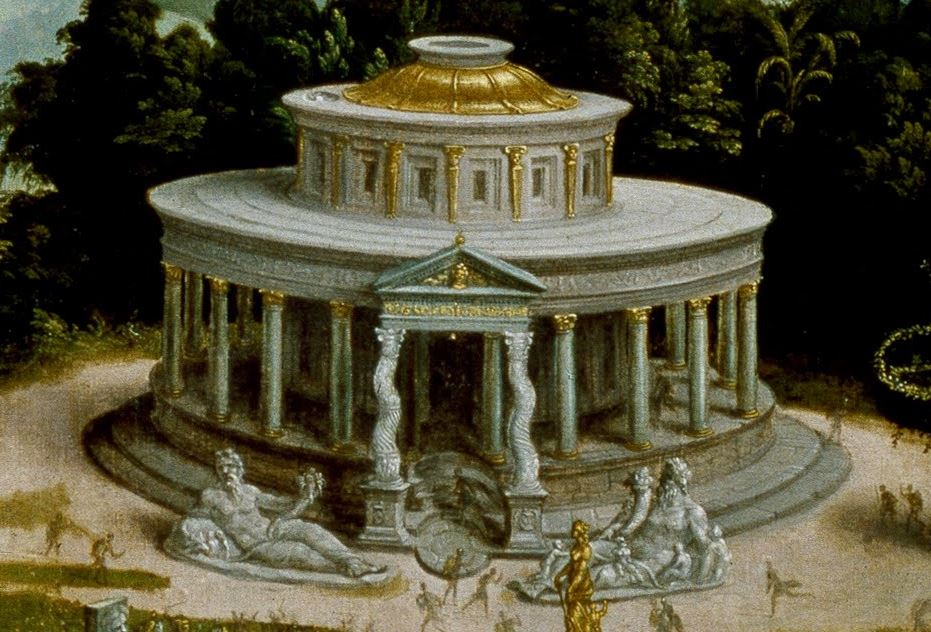
Reconstruction by M. van Heemskerck of the Temple of Isis with the statues of the Tiber and the Nile in front.

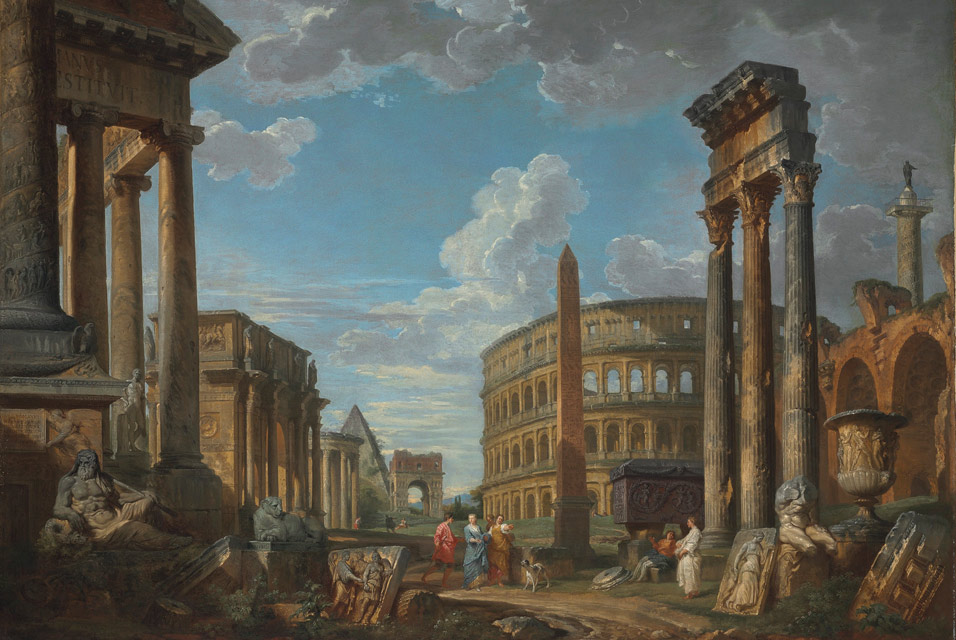
Painting circa 1730 with the statue in the Roman ruins.

The statue was discovered in 1512 in Rome at the site of the Temple of Isis and Serapis, near the present-day basilica of Santa Maria sopra Minerva. The statue undoubtedly decorated a fountain situated on the path leading to the sanctuary. It mirrored a statue of the Nile river (now preserved in the Vatican) in which Romulus and Remus are replaced by a crowd of children representing pygmies.

== History ==
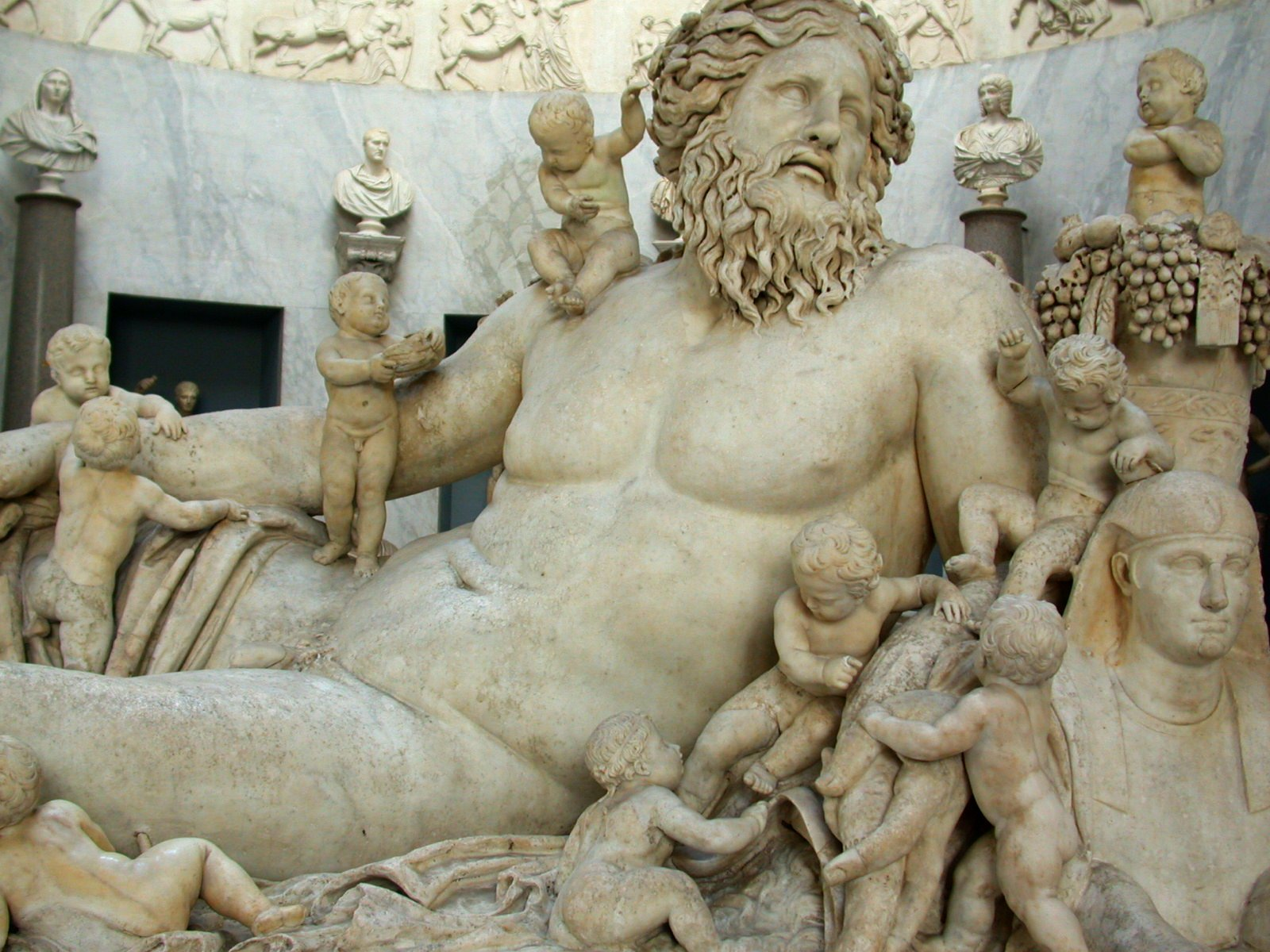
The Nile statue.

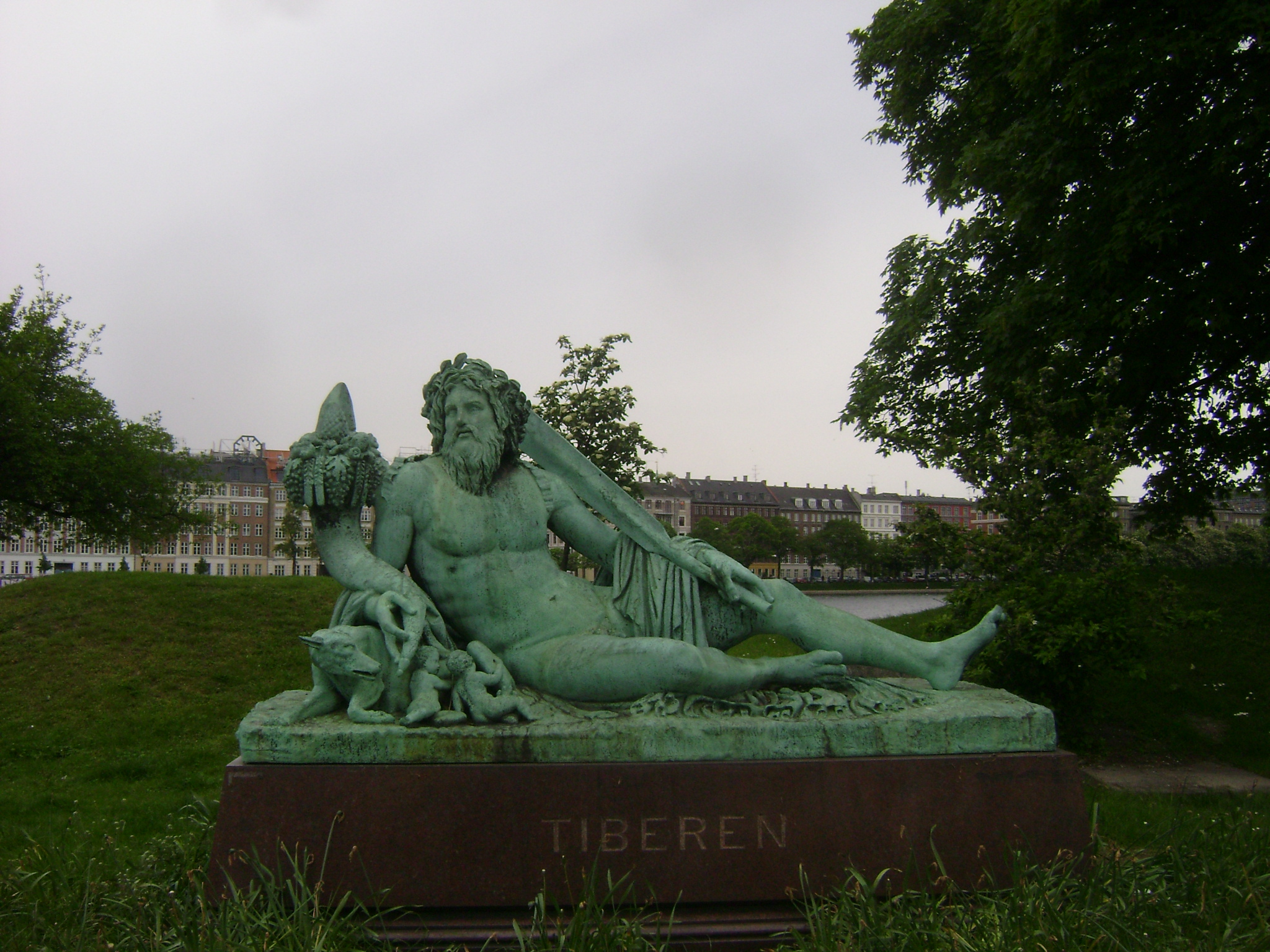
Replica of the statue in Copenhagen.

After their discovery, the two statues were initially preserved in the papal collections. Following the Treaty of Tolentino (1797) between the French Republic and the Papal States, they were transferred to the Louvre, where their presence was attested in 1811. In 1815, after the defeat of Napoleon, the statue of the Nile was returned to the Vatican. However, the statue of the Tiber was offered by the pope Pius VII to the French king Louis XVIII and remained in the Louvre.

The image of the statue of the Tiber was widely circulated and it became the subject of numerous marble or bronze replicas.

== Dating ==
The date of the sculpture is uncertain. It was probably installed after the fire at the Temple of Isis in 80 CE. But it could be from the later Hadrian period (117–138 CE).

== See also ==
- Temple of Isis and Serapis
