= Obelisco Agonale =

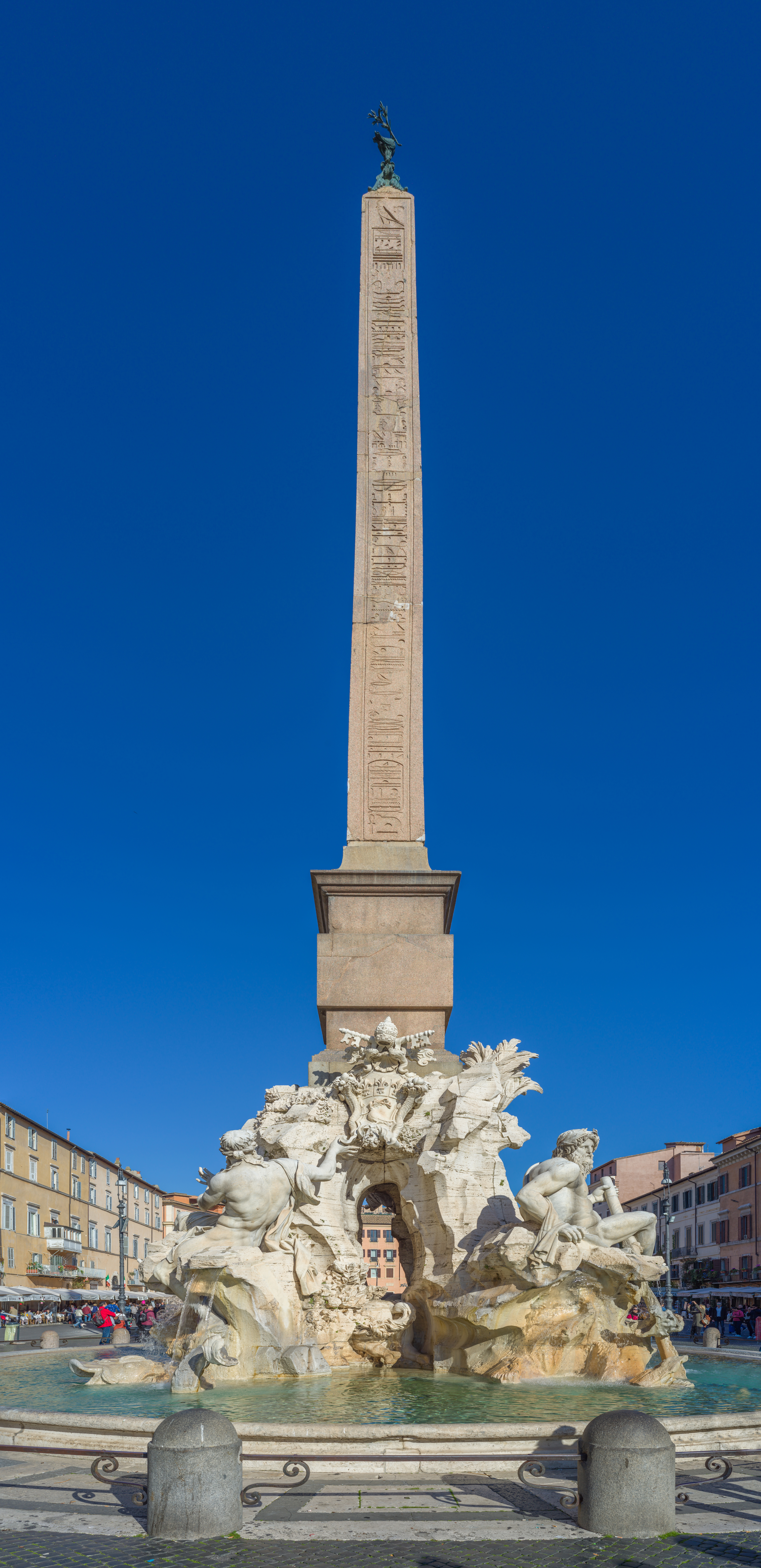
- The obelisk in 2018
- Interactive map of Obelisco Agonale
- Location: Rome, Italy

Obelisco Agonale is an obelisk in Rome, Italy. It is erected above the Fontana dei Quattro Fiumi.

== Description and history ==
The obelisk, made of Aswan granite, has an interesting history. It is connected with the emperor Domitian, and was originally thought to have come from the Serapeum, which the emperor rebuilt in A.D. 80. However, it is equally plausible that the obelisk might have originated from the Temple of the Gens Flavia on the Quirinal Hill, built by Domitian dedicated to his family cult. The hieroglyphic inscriptions on the obelisk were of Roman authorship, offering a hymn to Domitian, and the deified emperors Vespasian and Titus, possibly on the occasion of something being restored. In the fourth century, the obelisk was relocated to the circus of the emperor Maxentius, located between the Church of St. Sebastian and the tomb of Cecilia Metella along the Appian Way, where it was found and moved to the Fountain. The circus – as well as the nearby villa and mausoleum – was first believed to be attributed to the emperor Caracalla, until excavations carried out by Antonio Nibby in 1825, in which an inscription identifying the ownership of the site was found. At each of the four sides of the obelisk is a tablet, containing Athanasius Kircher's translation into Latin of its hieroglyphs.

== See also ==
- List of obelisks in Rome
