= Boboli obelisk =

Ancient Egyptian obelisk

Coordinates: 43°45′50.78″N 11°15′3.34″E

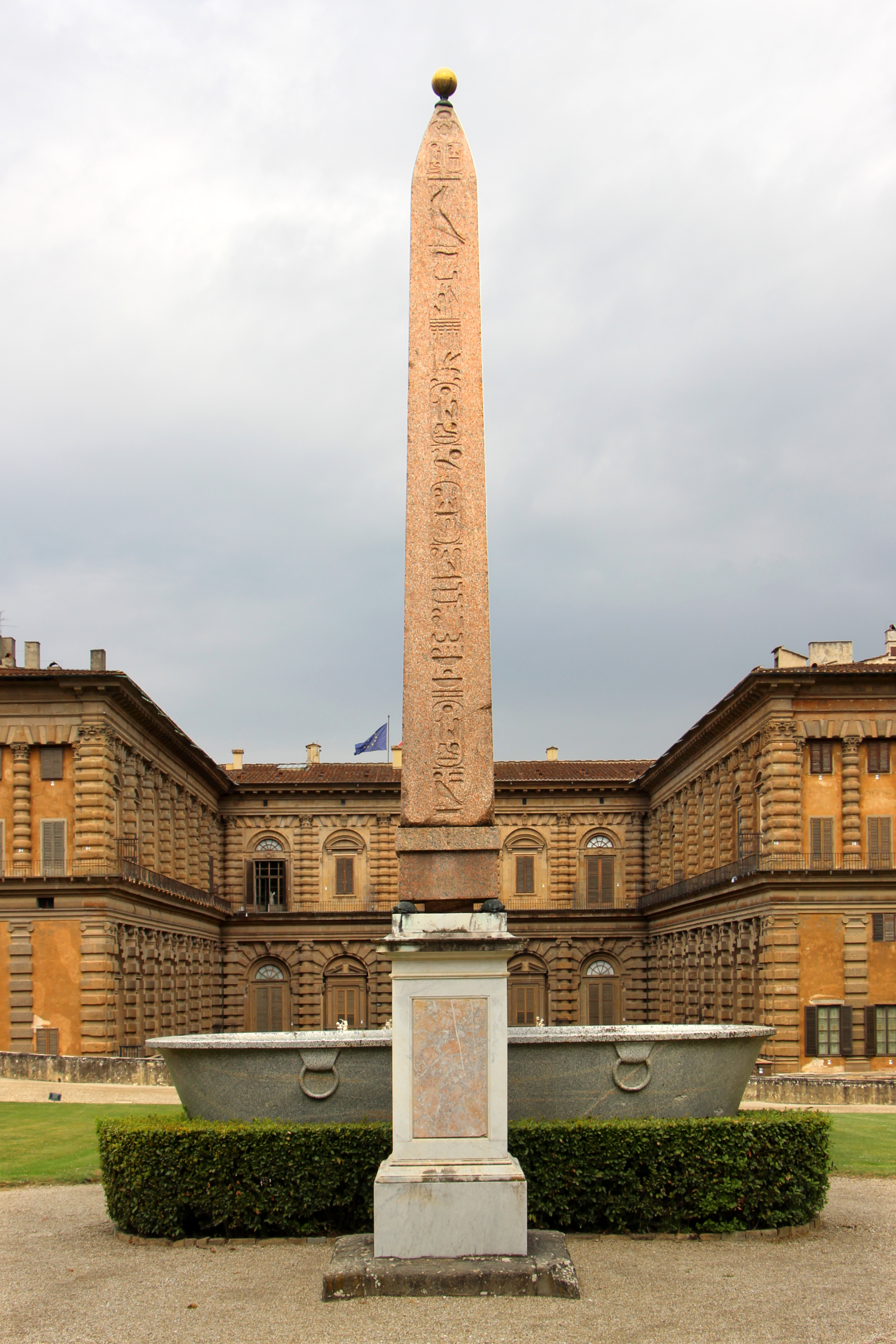
View of obelisk with Pitti Palace in background, Basin just next to obelisk

The Boboli obelisk, previously called the Obelisco Mediceo, is an ancient Egyptian granite obelisk, which was moved in the 18th century from Rome to Florence, where it was erected in the Boboli Gardens.

== History ==
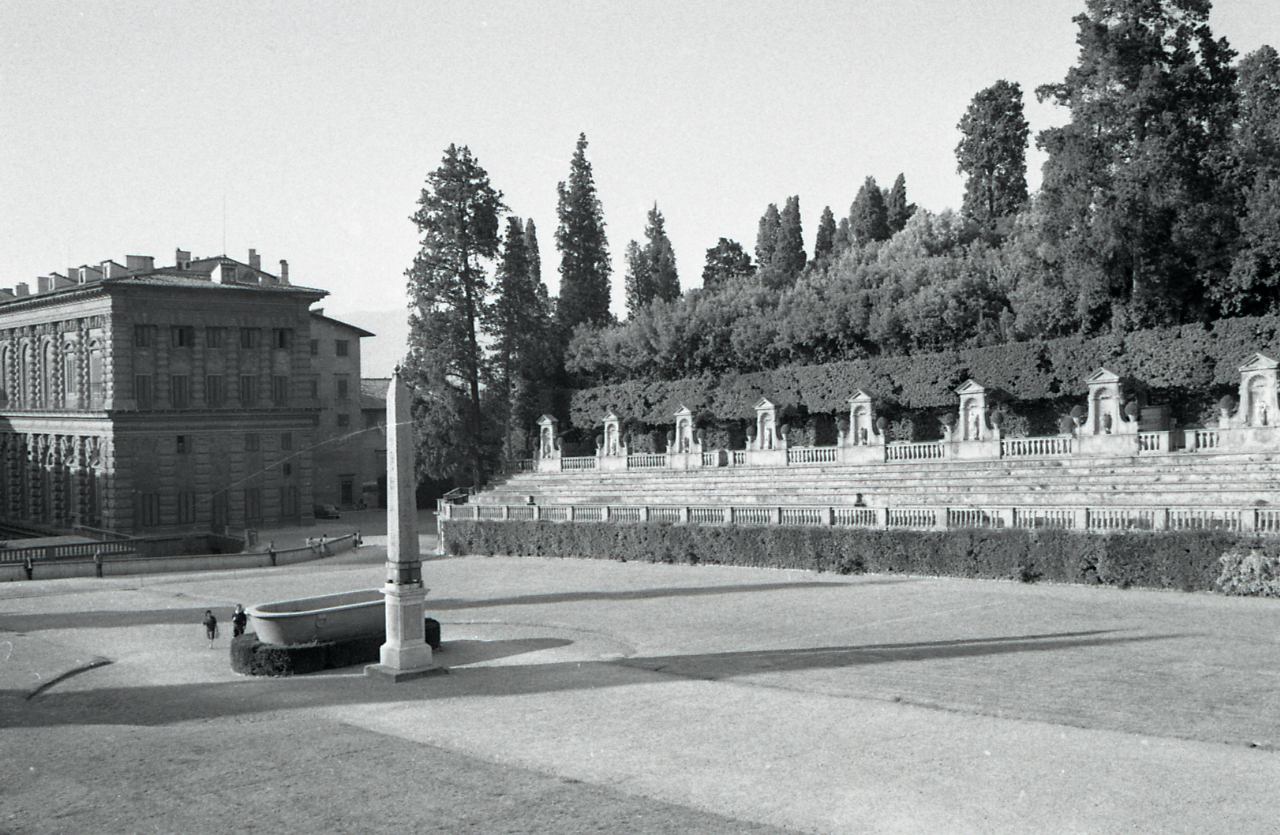
Palazzo Pitti (left) and the amphiteather of the Boboli Gardens with the obelisk. Photo by Paolo Monti, 1965.

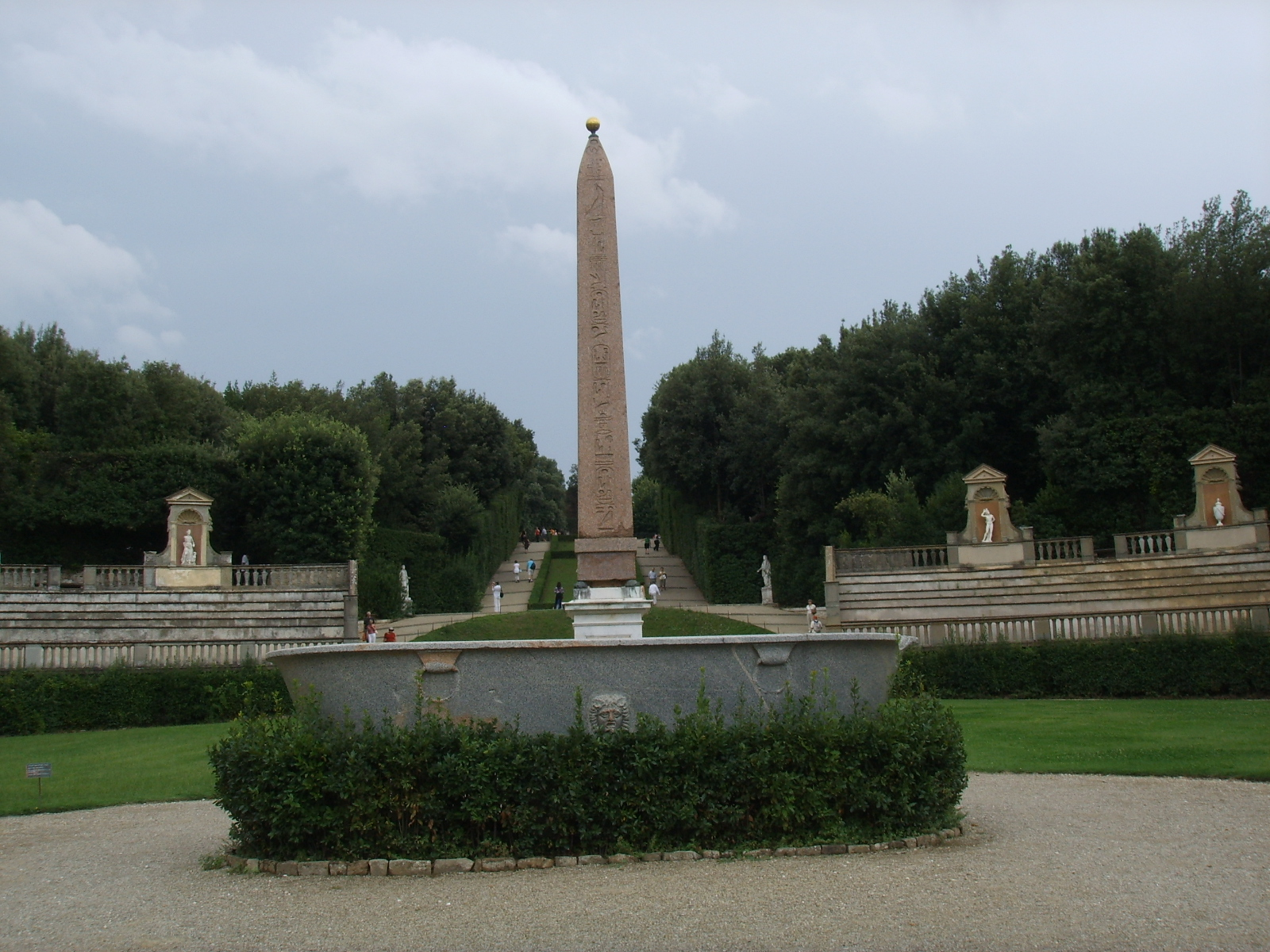
View of obelisk from palace

The granite from which the obelisk is carved comes from Aswan and the inscriptions are dedicated to Atum, the deity of the city of Heliopolis. It is suspected to have been first erected in that city during the reign of Ramesses II. In the first century AD, it was moved to Rome by Domitian and placed in the Temple of Isis in the Campus Martius, along with three other obelisks still in Rome: the Obelisk at the Monument to those fallen at Dogali, the Obelisk of Piazza of the Pantheon, and the obelisk in front of Santa Minerva.

In the sixteenth century, Cardinal Ferdinand I de' Medici bought the 6-metre high obelisk in Rome and placed it in the gardens of the Villa Medici. When the Grand Duke Peter Leopold of Lorraine became Grand-Duke of Tuscany, he transferred to Florence many of the artworks in the Villa Medici. In 1788 he moved the obelisk, which weighed 9,000 kilograms, traveling first to Livorno, then by land to Florence. The voyage took four months. He also moved the Ancient Roman basin made of granite that had been associated with the obelisk in the Villa Medici.

It was erected near the center of the Amphitheater of the Boboli Gardens in 1790, along the main axis leading away from the palace. In 1840, the granite basin, originally thought to derive from the Terme Alessandrine found in the Campo Martius of Rome, was also included in front of the obelisk. The arrangement was designed by Pasquale Poccianti. The obelisk is surmounted by a gilded orb and the base has four turtles. Both these accoutrements were present in Rome.

Underlying the traditional solar winged scarab to the top of the obelisk you can read the name and the first name of Ramesses II, from which the obelisk was erected. Entries, which are its titles, read: "Grand Master, powerful in all countries, the King, the Son of Tum and intelligent son of Atum." The King is also called "loved" by Tum and Ra, and this shows that the obelisk is directly from Heliopolis, the city of the "Sun" (Ra).

== See also ==
- List of Egyptian obelisks

== Bibliography ==
- Litta Maria Medrano (ed), The Boboli Gardens , Banca Toscana, 2003.
- John Henry Parker "The Twelve Egyptian Obelisks In Rome: Their History Explained By Translations Of The Inscriptions Upon Them" (1879)
